= Basilica of St. John the Evangelist, Oleśnica =

Roman Catholic basilica in Oleśnica, Poland

Basilica of St. John the Evangelist
- Bazylika Świętego Jana Apostoła (Polish)
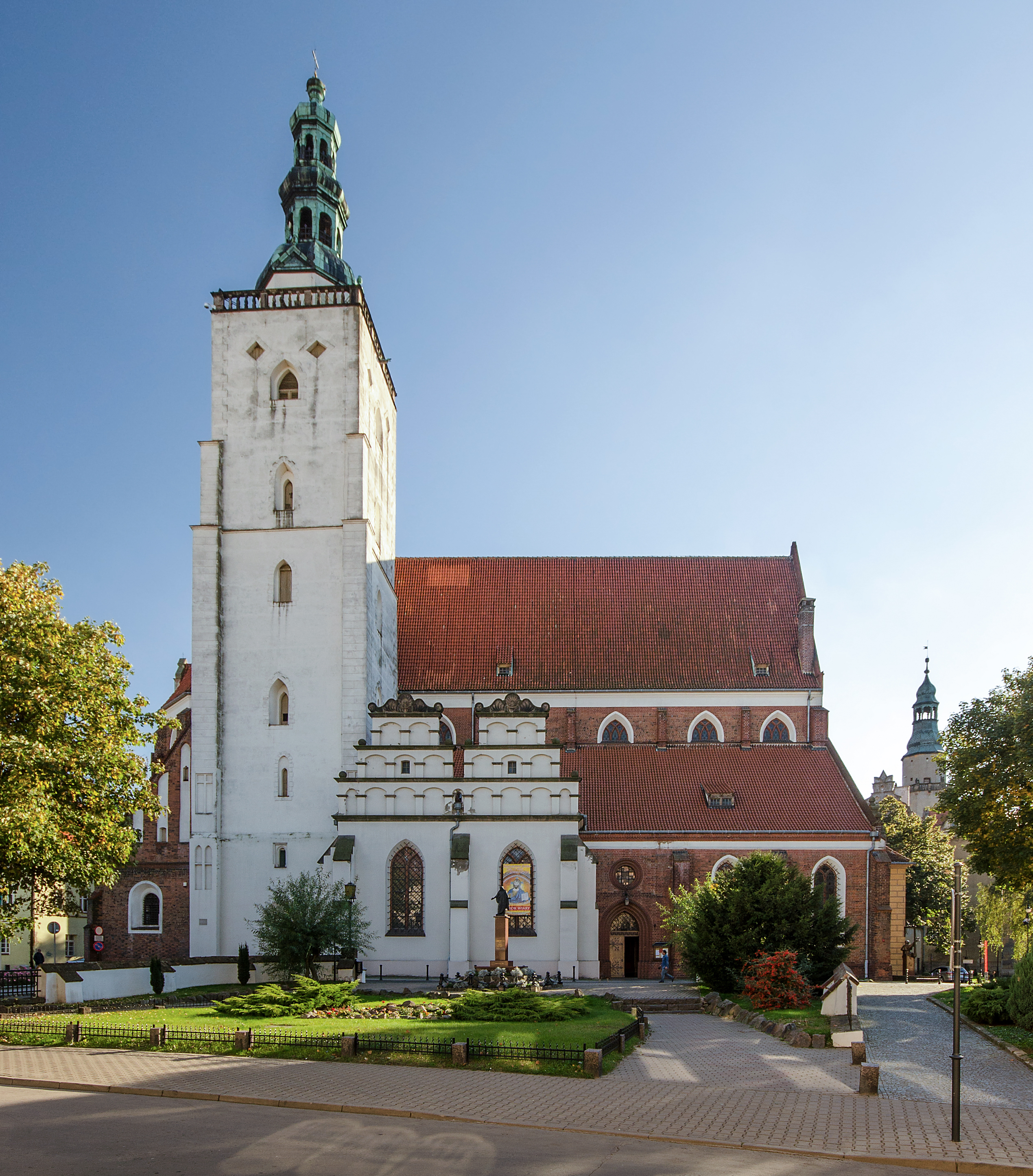
- Basilica of St. John the Evangelist in Oleśnica
- Basilica of St. John the Evangelist
- 51°12′34″N 17°22′41″E
- Location: Oleśnica
- Address: Książąt Śląskich Square
- Country: Poland
- Denomination: Roman Catholic Church
- Previous denomination: Protestantism (1538–1945)
- Website: parafiaolesnica.pl

History
- Dedication: John the Evangelist

Architecture
- Functional status: Active
- Style: Gothic, Renaissance, Mannerism, Baroque
- Years built: 2nd half of 13th century
- Demolished: 1905

Specifications
- Materials: Brick

Administration
- Archdiocese: Archdiocese of Wrocław
- Parish: Parish of St. John the Evangelist

The Basilica of St. John the Evangelist (Polish: Bazylika Świętego Jana Apostoła), formerly the Castle Church (German: Schlosskirche), is a Roman Catholic parish church in the Oleśnica West deanery within the Archdiocese of Wrocław. Between 1538 and 1945, the building functioned as a Protestant church dedicated to John the Baptist. On 8 October 1998, it received the honorary title of minor basilica.

Documentary evidence of the church and its parish first appears in records dating to 1230. The brick structure was constructed in the second half of the 13th century and served as the castle church. The building underwent repeated reconstructions by the Poděbrady, Württemberg, and Hohenzollern families. These modifications have resulted in an architectural form that integrates elements of Gothic, Renaissance, Mannerism, and Baroque styles. In 1616, a passage was added, connecting the church to the Oleśnica Castle. An enlargement project undertaken in 1905 culminated in a structural collapse of the southern nave and the main nave. In 1910, the church was subsequently rebuilt and modernized.

The interior contains monuments such as the only surviving chained library in Central Europe. Further features include the organ, the Mannerist pulpit, the ducal loge, choir stalls, galleries, bells, a Baroque high altar, and the mausolea of the Poděbrady and Württemberg families, which house coffins and sarcophagi belonging to members of both dynasties.

== History ==
=== Origins and the Piast period ===
According to Oleśnica historiographer Johann Sinapius, local tradition held that the parish church of St. John the Evangelist was founded in 979, with its dedication allegedly performed by John the Baptist himself during the episcopate of the first Bishop of Silesia. This date of foundation has not been confirmed by historical scholarship. Moreover, the first bishopric in Silesia was established only in 1000, with its seat in Wrocław. Archaeological investigations carried out in 1907 confirmed the existence of a wooden chapel on the site later occupied by the brick church. The earliest documented references to the church and its parish appear in 1230, in a charter issued by Henry the Bearded. In this document, the duke directed his chancellor and canon, Tomasz I – provost of the parish of St. John the Evangelist in Oleśnica – to confer German town law upon the village of Lucień.

During the second half of the 13th century, the brick church building was constructed. In the second half of the 14th century, the structure was enlarged into a three-nave basilica with a tower and began to be designated as the castle church. In 1433, the church acquired its first bell. Between 1465 and 1469, Mikołaj Hoferichter and Mikołaj Fischer conducted works to widen and heighten the edifice. In 1469, the final year of their project, new groin vaults and liernes were installed, and a chancel was added. In 1473, a second bell was installed.

=== Poděbrady period and Protestantism ===
Between 1500 and 1510, following the accession of the Poděbrady family to power in the Duchy of Oleśnica, the church underwent further reconstruction. A northern nave was added, along with two chapels, a church porch, and a second sacristy. A baptismal font was installed, and the ducal family endowed a new altar. In 1521, a third bell was hung in the tower. During the first half of the 16th century, under George I of Münsterberg, the teachings of Martin Luther gained increasing acceptance in Oleśnica, promoted within the ducal court by the tutor Johann Heß. In 1538, the Poděbrady family expelled the Catholic clergy from the duchy. That same year, the church was transferred to Protestants and rededicated to John the Baptist. The Poděbrady family also established their dynastic crypt within the church. In 1555, work commenced in the chancel on a polychrome depicting the family tree of John of Münsterberg-Oels. The composition was completed three years later. It was likely painted over or removed during the 19th century. Between 1557 and 1558, the church received a new ceramic roof covering, and a tomb was installed for Duke Jan and his wife Krystyna Szydłowiecka. In 1563, Duke Jan funded the addition of a fourth bell.

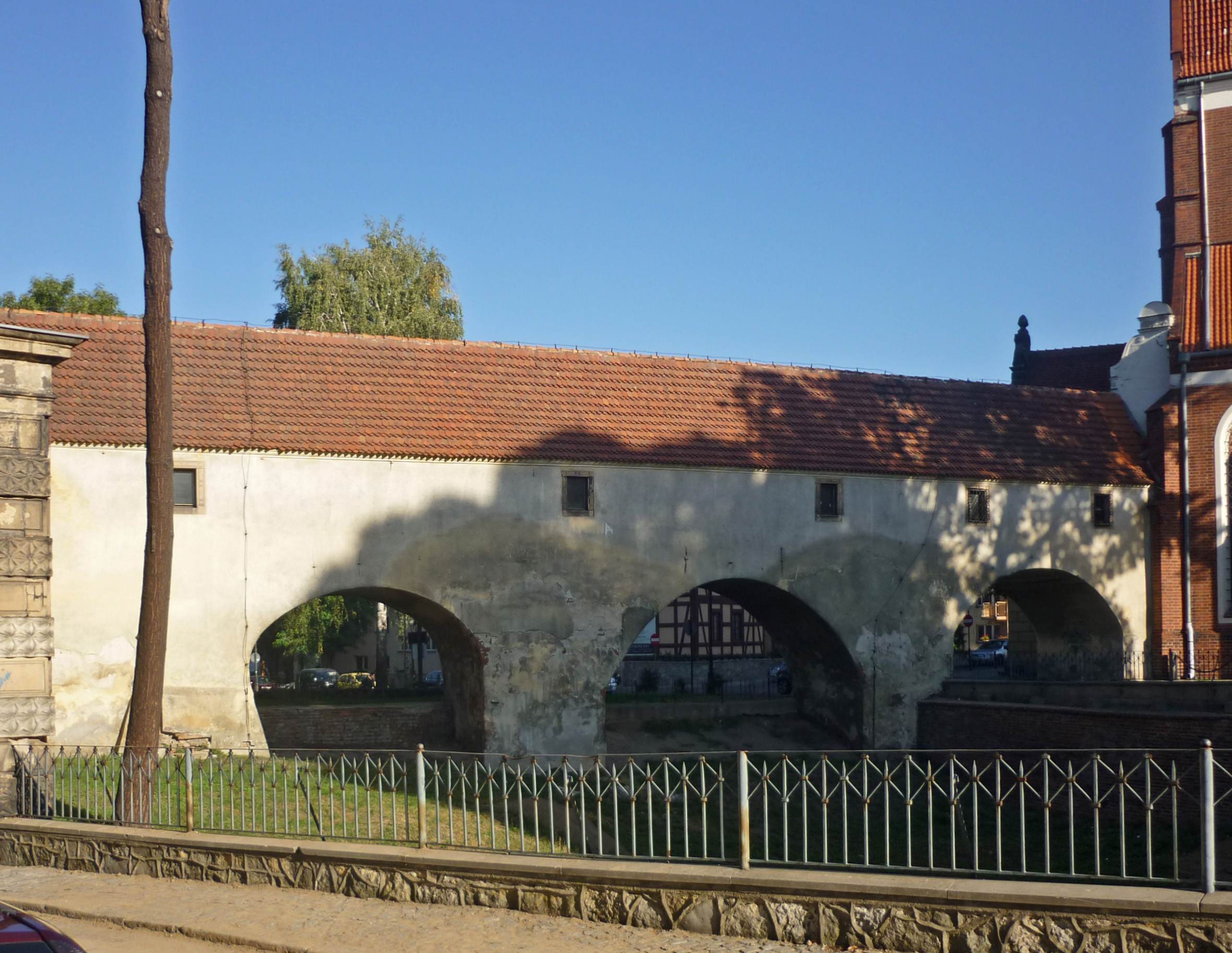
Passage between the castle (left) and the church (right)

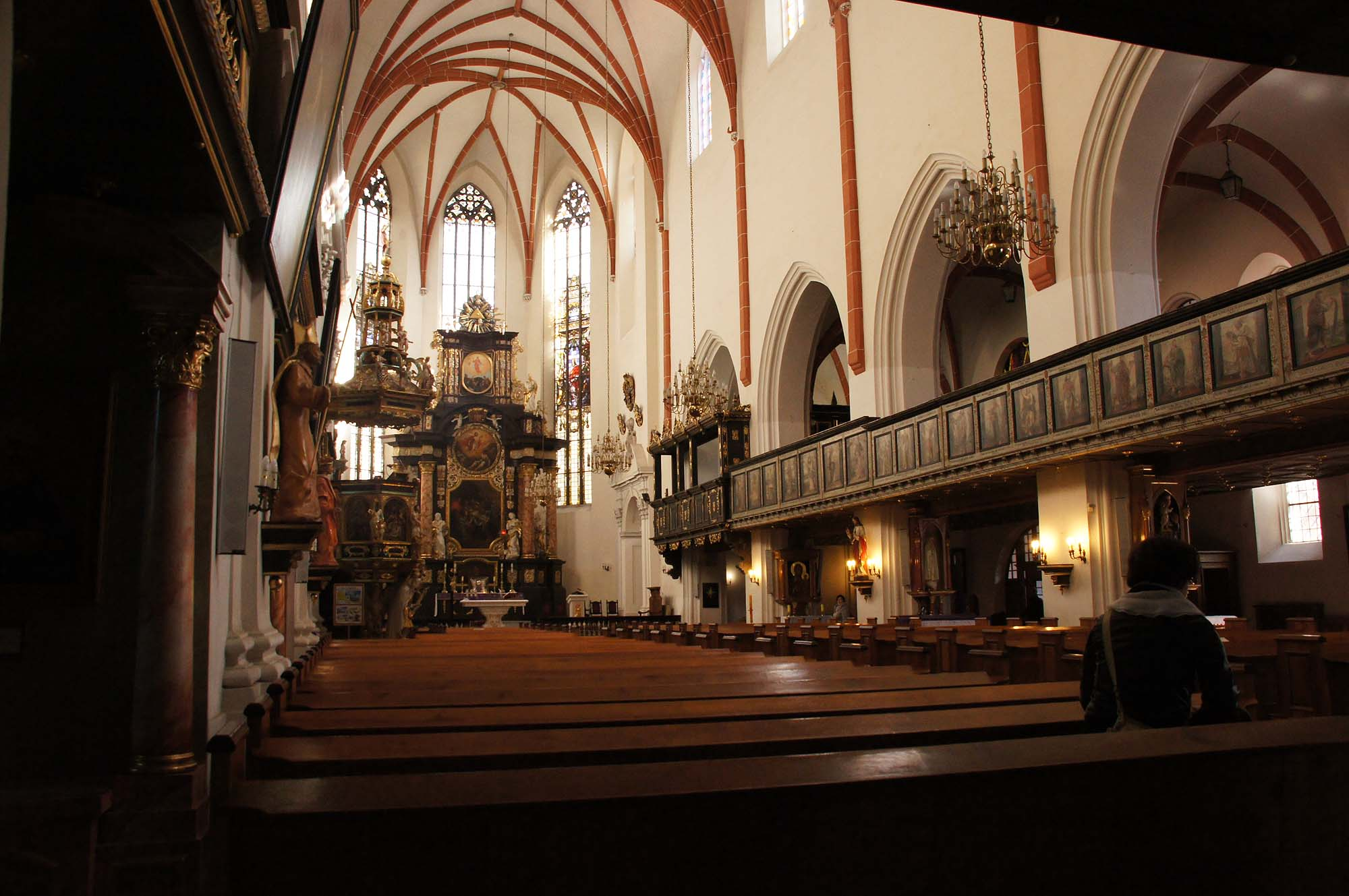
View of the western nave of the church and matroneum with paintings

In 1594, Duke Karl II established a public chained library, installed in the southern church porch, where it remains to the present day. This is one of several chained libraries documented in Silesia, and the only one preserved in its original location. Books, owing to their value, were secured by chains. At its opening, the library contained 550 volumes, of which 239 survive into the 21st century. Comparable chained libraries formerly existed in Wrocław, Brzeg, Legnica, and Złotoryja. The collections from Legnica were transferred after World War II to the University Library in Wrocław; those from Złotoryja were moved to the National Library in Warsaw; and the Wrocław library was either destroyed or incorporated into the University Library.

Between 1596 and 1607, a Mannerist matroneum was constructed in the church, decorated by Friedrich Lochner with depictions of Old Testament prophets and New Testament saints. In 1605, the late-Renaissance, Mannerist pulpit was erected, financed either by Duke Charles II and his wife Elisabeth Magdalena von Schlesien-Liegnitz or by the burghers of Oleśnica. The sculpture was executed by Martin Riedel of Wrocław, the paintings by Friedrich Lochner, and the overall design attributed to Gerhard Hendrik of Amsterdam who valued his contribution at 400 thalers. The pulpit is regarded as the most significant late-Renaissance monument in Silesia. In 1616, a covered passageway was built, linking the church directly to the Oleśnica Castle for the convenience of the ducal couple. Between 1619 and 1620, the church tower was rebuilt: its height was increased, a new storey added, and the structure crowned with a Renaissance gallery and a helmet surmounted by a roof lantern. At the summit, a figure of a rooster with outstretched wings and an extended tail was placed. The rooster symbolized divine grace toward sinners and human frailty before the risen Christ; during the Protestant period, it served as a distinguishing mark of Reformed churches in contrast to Catholic ones.

=== Württemberg period ===
In 1698, the Württembergs initiated construction of a Baroque funerary chapel (mausoleum with crypt) on the southern side of the church. The work was completed in 1700. The crypt contained 24 coffins with the remains of deceased members of the ducal family.

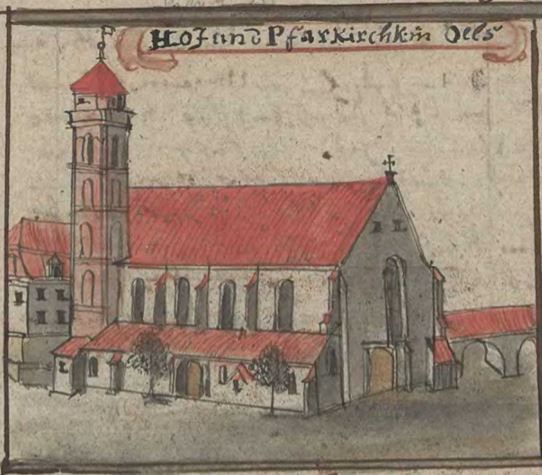
Depiction of the church by Friedrich Bernhard Werner (18th century)

Between 1700 and 1708, further alterations were carried out under Württemberg patronage to impart a Baroque character to the church. This phase included the execution of paintings on the matroneum beneath the choir, transformation of the northern wall of the main nave, and the erection of a Baroque high altar featuring sculptures, paintings, and decorative elements. Only the figure of St. John the Baptist has survived of the altar's original sculptures. In 1740, painting work in the mausoleum was completed, with scenes from the Passion of Jesus applied to the vault of the chapel. In 1754, the tower helmet was restored and crowned with a ducal mitre to mark the 10th anniversary of Duke Charles Christian Erdmann's reign. This ornament remained in place until 1905.

=== Hohenzollern period ===
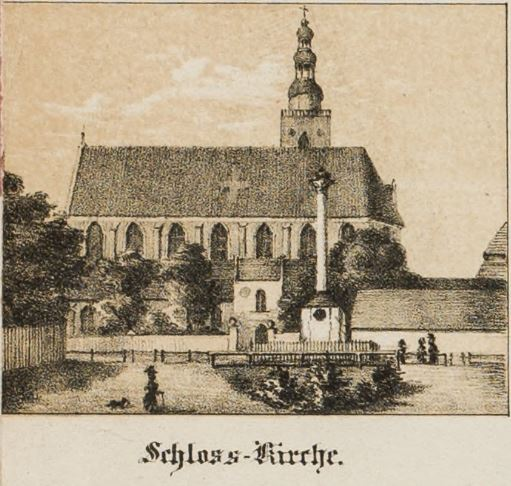
Castle Church and Kolumna Złotych Godów on a lithograph by Adolf Groeger (18th century)

In 1884, upon the death of Duke William of the Welf dynasty, who left no heirs, the Duchy of Oleśnica passed to the Kingdom of Prussia in accordance with the provisions of the time, as the duke's will contained no instructions regarding succession. The duchy was subsequently divided, and Oleśnica became a throne fief held by successors to the Prussian crown. As a result, the Hohenzollern dynasty assumed responsibility for both the castle and the church. By the turn of the 19th and 20th centuries, the church required enlargement to accommodate a growing congregation and to achieve a representative appearance appropriate for the heir to the throne. Three successive reconstruction projects were prepared. The first proposal was rejected by the emperor's representative and provincial monument conservator, Hans Lutsch, on the grounds that it would fail to confer sufficient representative character. In 1902, the architect Hans Poelzig was commissioned to develop a new scheme. His design included the expansion of matronea, new circulation routes, relocation of the ducal box, enlargement of the church porch, installation of central heating, and the addition of a toilet. This plan was also declined by the conservator, who determined that it would cause unacceptable damage to the historic matronea. In 1903, Poelzig submitted a revised proposal in consultation with the emperor's representative. The new design called for the removal of three western matronea while preserving the left and right ones unchanged. A new church porch was planned on the western side (forming the present main entrance to the basilica), with stairs providing access to the matronea. A boiler room for central heating was to be situated beneath the entrance. This version received approval in 1904 from the parish, the emperor's representative, and the monument conservator. Poelzig subsequently prepared sketches and a cost estimate of 130,000 marks.

On the evening of 15 July 1905, the main nave and the southern nave collapsed. Contemporary investigations did not identify a single definitive cause, though the deteriorated condition of the southern pillars was considered a contributing factor. It was later determined that the brick pillars had been constructed with internal rubble fill. Legal proceedings followed, during which both Poelzig and the construction manager faced accusations of negligence and insufficient experience, respectively. However, an opinion by Prof. Conrad Steinbrecht from Malbork exonerated them, attributing the disaster to the faulty construction of the pillars, which dated to the 15th century. The parish reached an agreement with the monarch that the church should be rebuilt rather than replaced with a new structure. Reconstruction was entrusted to the royal building councillor Adolf Koehler (Köchler) and was completed in 1910. The works included the construction of a western church porch, the creation of a new staircase, restoration of the sundial on the southern wall, installation of central heating, and renovation of the tower. The rooster figure atop the tower was replaced with a weather vane in the form of a rooster.

=== Post-war period and 21st century ===
The church sustained no damage during the military operations of World War II. the rooster figure on the tower was replaced with a cross. This cross was in turn replaced in 1998 with a new one. Beneath the original cross, a time capsule in the form of a sphere was discovered, containing a letter from Pastor Konrad Koehler, a letter from either Duke Charles of Württemberg-Bernstadt or Duke Charles Christian Erdmann, a copy of the newspaper Lokomotive an der Oder dated 1905, a medal from 1744, and several coins. Following the works, new mementos were placed in the sphere and sealed.

On 27 December 1998, the church was elevated to the status of minor basilica by the Prefect of the Dicastery for Divine Worship and the Discipline of the Sacraments, Cardinal Jorge Medina.

On 29 October 2000, the basilica was visited by Cardinal Joseph Ratzinger.

== Architecture ==
The basilica is an oriented structure comprising seven bays and three nave, with a single-bay chancel that is not externally differentiated from the main body and terminates in a straight east wall. Adjoining the chancel is the church tower, which houses the bell chamber. The chancel matches the main nave in both width and height. The naves are supported by a system of pillars. The northern nave is narrower than the southern one. At its eastern end stands a square tower incorporating a sacristy. Along the northern nave are three chapels, a church porch, and a baptismal chapel. The southern nave features an attached church porch and two staircases providing access to the matronea. Extending from the southern wall of the chancel is an octagonal chapel-mausoleum. Pillars separate the naves, terminating in pointed arches on the southern side and semicircular arches on the northern side. Matronea occupy three sides of the main nave above the arcades. In the western part of the church is a Neo-Mannerist church porch with a decorative wooden ceiling and a staircase leading to the choir loft.

From the southwestern corner, a pillar-arcaded passageway connects the church to the adjacent castle.

The main nave and chancel share a common roof. The sacristy is covered by a shed roof, while the chapel-mausoleum has a domed roof surmounted by a roof lantern. The northern nave, together with its two chapels and church porch, as well as the southern nave, are roofed with shed structures. The baptismal chapel and the western church porch are each covered by a separate gable roof. The tower is crowned with a helmet resting on an octagonal base and incorporating two roof lanterns.

Vaulting includes liernes over the chancel, main nave, and sacristy; rib vaults in the side naves, northern chapels, and church porch; and a net vault with brick ribs in the southern church porch. The weight of the main nave vault is borne by flying buttresses concealed beneath the roofs of the side naves.

The mausoleum at ground level is articulated with voluted corbels, above which rise pilasters with composite capitals. Panels with acanthus leaf ornamentation appear between the consoles. The upper register features four oval windows and four panels framed by wreaths intended for paintings. The composition is crowned by a cornice. The interior of the dome is decorated with scenes from the Passion of Jesus.

== Furnishings ==
=== Main altar ===
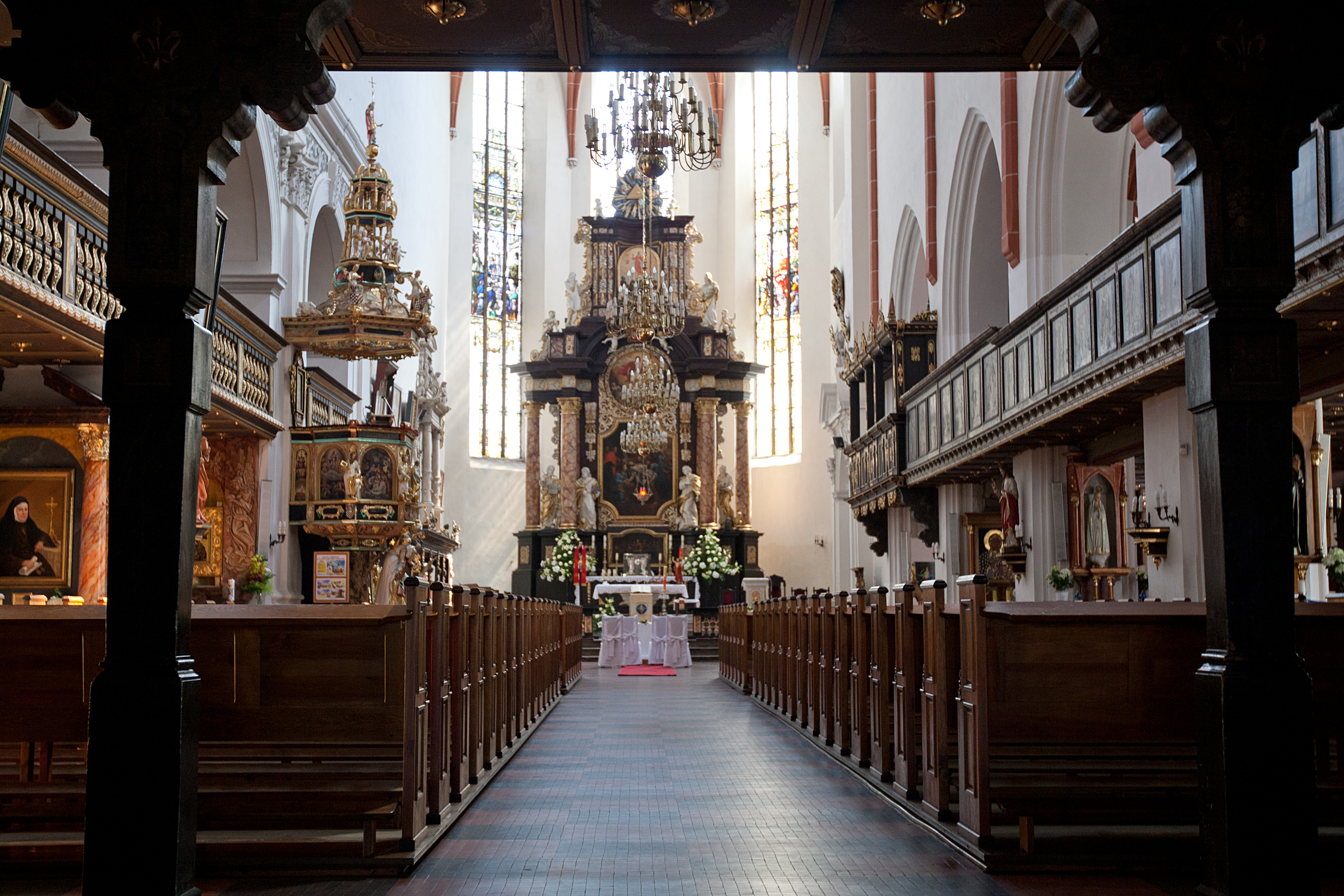
View of the altar and pulpit

The Baroque main altar, endowed by Duke Charles Frederick II in 1708, is positioned on the eastern wall of the church. It is a two-tiered structure with a three-axial socle. All sculptural and decorative elements were executed by Johann Riedel of Wrocław. The authorship of the paintings remains unknown, although it is conjectured that the artist included a self-portrait in the central panel depicting the Entombment, as one figure – distinctive in its direct gaze toward the viewer – stands out from the composition. The division into two storeys symbolically corresponds to the Old and New Testaments. The upper register is crowned by a gloria incorporating the Eye of Providence. Sculpted figures of John the Baptist (representing the New Testament) and Moses (representing the Old Testament) occupy this level. The lower register constitutes the main field of the altar, articulated by four columns and divided into three axes. Between the columns stand sculptures of the four Evangelists: John, Luke, Mark, and Matthew. The central axis contains four oil paintings illustrating key moments from the life of Christ: the Last Supper at the predella level behind the tabernacle, followed upward by the Entombment, the Resurrection, and finally the Ascension. This sequence represents the stages of redemption.

=== Pulpit ===
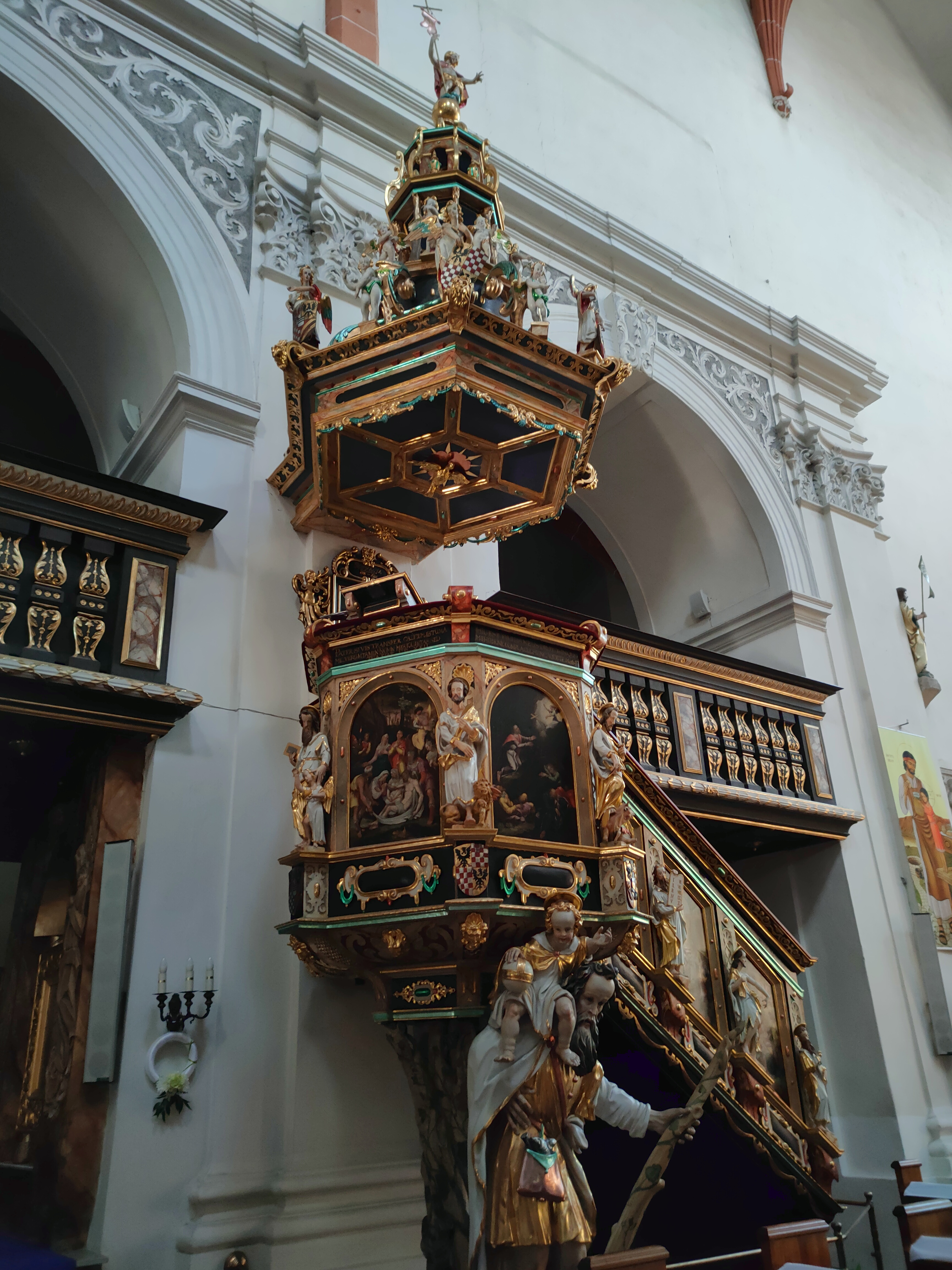
Mannerist pulpit

The Mannerist pulpit was designed by Geert Hendrik (Gerhard Hendrick), painted by Friedrich Lochner, and executed in wood by Marcin Riedel. It rests upon a figure of Saint Christopher. The hexagonal pulpit basket is accessed by a staircase featuring a decorated gate with a relief of Adam and Eve and a painting titled Head of Christ Crowned with Thorns. The basket itself is adorned with a cycle of paintings depicting scenes from the life of Jesus. The canopy is surmounted by a figure of the Risen Christ flanked by angels bearing the heraldic shields of the Poděbrady, Piast, Mecklenburg-Güstrow, and Hohenzollern families. Suspended between the canopy and the pulpit console is a painting of the Crucifixion.

=== Organ ===
The earliest documented reference to an organ in the church dates to 1605, when an instrument was located on the eastern wall; the date of its construction is unknown. It was dismantled in 1655 during renovation works. A new organ was installed in 1659, likely the work of Bernhard Sorge.

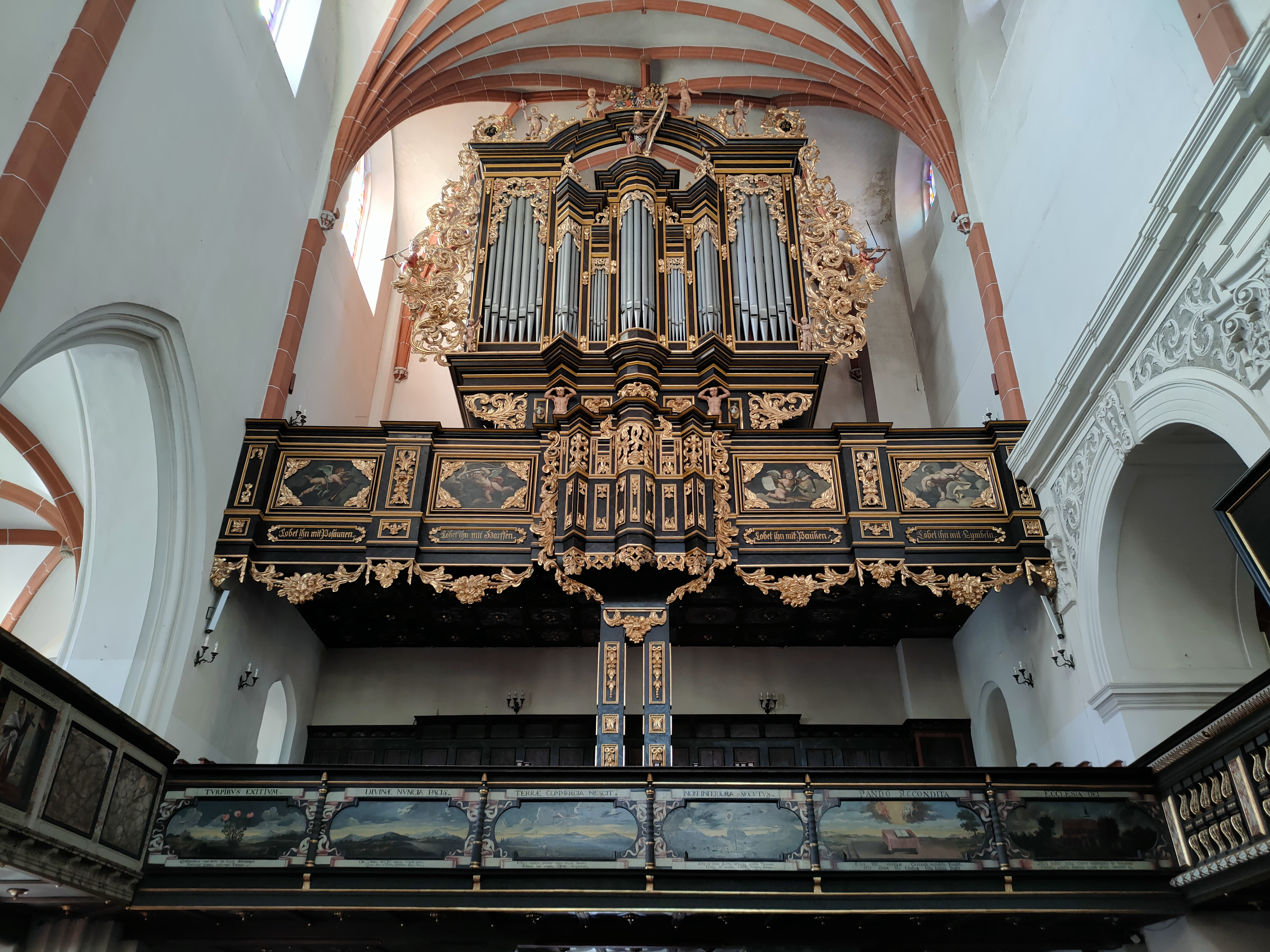
Organ, music choir, and western matroneum

The subsequent instrument was commissioned by Duke Silvius I Nimrod and his wife Eleanor Caroline of Mömpelgard and constructed between 1685 and 1686 by Daniel Wager. It comprised 26 pipes and two manuals.

In 1719, Michael Engler carried out the first documented repair. Further repairs were performed in 1756 by Wilhelm Scheffler of Brzeg (on the organ and bellows) and in 1787 by Gottlieb Benjamin. Between 1856 and 1858 Johann Gottlieb Anders directed a major reconstruction, during which the pipes from the positive organ were relocated into the main organ case.

The present organ was built in 1910 by the firm Schlag & Söhne of Świdnica as opus 878 following the 1905 structural collapse. It possesses 41 pipes distributed across three manuals and pedal. The console is integrated into the base of the organ case.

After World War II, maintenance included a repair in 1946 by Joseph Bach and Stefan Fiołka (or alternatively in 1973 under P. Słowik). Between 1996 and 1997, Wiesław Piechówka renovated the choir loft and organ prospectus. From 2002 to 2012, the Antoni Szydłowski Organ Workshop conducted comprehensive renovation and conservation work.

Organ specification
| Manual I | Manual II | Manual III | Pedal |
|---|---|---|---|
| 1. Principal 16' | 1. Burdon 16' | 1. Lieblich Gedackt 8' | 1. Principalbass 16' |
| 2. Principal 8' | 2. Geigen Principal 8' | 2. Flöten Principal 8' | 2. Violonbass 16' |
| 3. Gamba 8' | 3. Flute harmonique 8' | 3. Portunal 8' | 3. Subbass 16' |
| 4. Konzertflöte 8' | 4. Salizet 8' | 4. Vox coelestis 8' | 4. Gedacktbass 16' |
| 5. Gemshorn 8' | 5. Rohrflöte 8' | 5. Aeoline 8' | 5. Octavbass 8' |
| 6. Doppelflöte 8' | 6. Traversflöte 4' | 6. Lieblich Gedackt 8' | 6. Violoncello 8' |
| 7. Offenflöte 4' | 7. Viola 4' | 7. Rohrflöte 4' | 7. Bassflöte 8' |
| 8. Octave 4' | 8. Piccolo 2' | 8. Flautino 2' | 8. Principal 4' |
| 9. Rauschquinte 2 2/3'+2' | 9. Mixtur 3 fach | 9. Oboe 8' | 9. Quinte 10 2/3' |
| 10. Kornett 1-3 fach | 10. Klarinette 8' | | 10. Posaune 16' |
| 11. Mixtur 4-5 fach | | | |
| 12. Trompete 8' | | | |

=== Ducal box and stalls ===
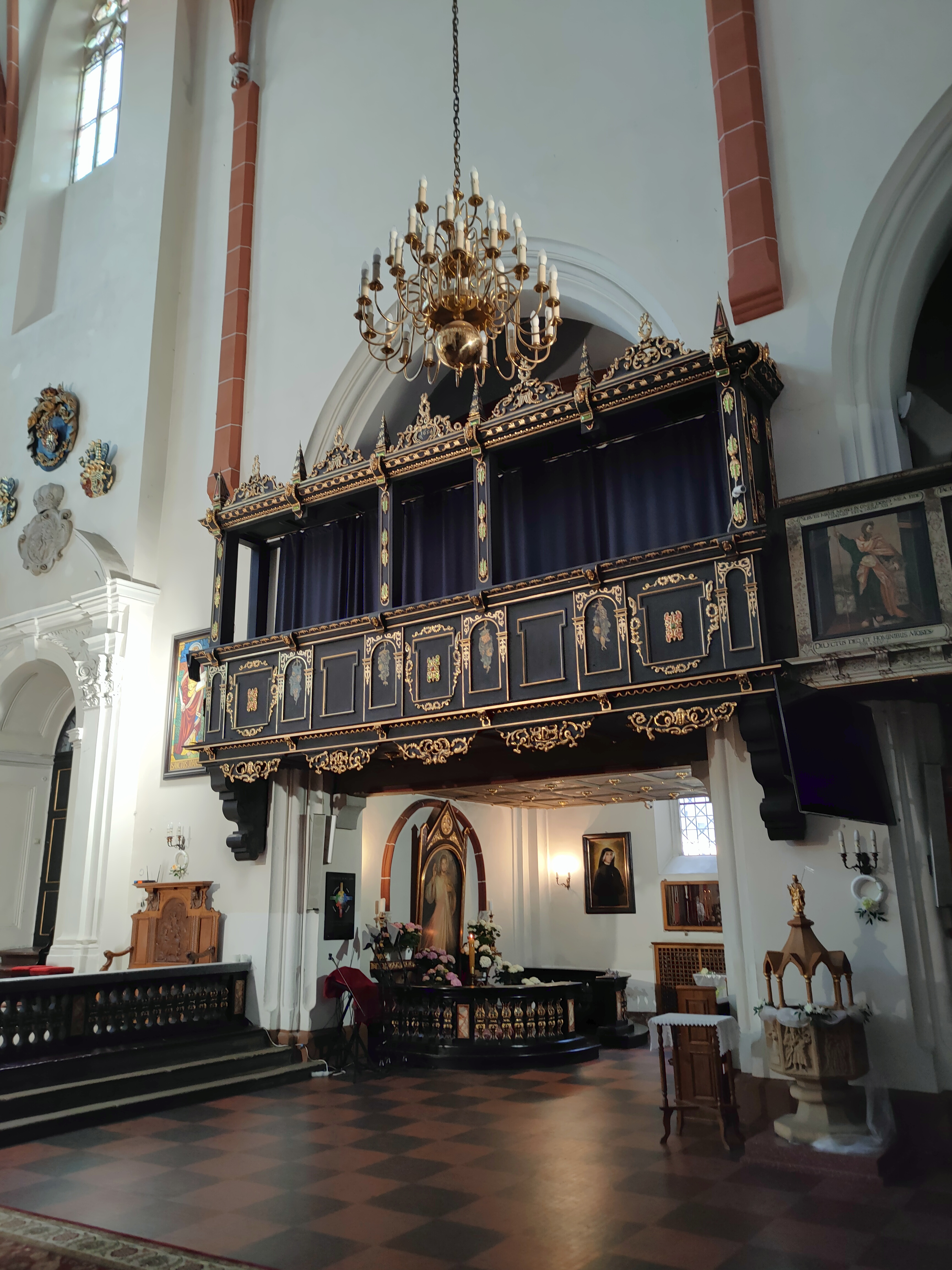
Ducal box

In 1687, early Baroque choir stalls were commissioned at the special request of Duke Silvius II Frederick. Following the church's gradual loss of its function as a castle church after 1805, the stalls no longer served the dukes and their families. From the 19th century onward, they came to be known as the preacher's box, as they were used by Protestant clergy.

Originally, the ducal boxes were positioned opposite the pulpit, which stood on the second pillar, and adjoined the organ gallery near the ducal passageway linking the church to the castle. They were destroyed in the 1905 disaster. In 1908, the surviving elements of two boxes were used to reconstruct a single box, which was then placed on the matroneum adjacent to the chancel.

The basilica also houses medieval choir stalls originally intended for wealthier burghers. Before 1905, these were located closer to the altar. They were restored in 1992 and repositioned in the chancel.

=== Bells ===
Four church bells hang in the tower, representing the oldest surviving examples of bell-founding in Oleśnica:

- A bell from 1433, weighing 658 kg and measuring 102 cm in diameter, bearing the signature of Hans Schikil;
- A bell from 1473, funded by Mikołaj Opicz, weighing 1850 kg and measuring 145 cm in diameter;
- A bell from 1521, weighing 349 kg and measuring 83 cm in diameter, inscribed in Latin: "AVE MARIA GRACIA PLENA DOMINUS TECVM BENEDI 1521";
- A bell from 1563, funded by John of Münsterberg-Oels, weighing 568 kg and measuring 97 cm in diameter. It cracked and was recast in 1727. The bell carries a Latin inscription arranged in three rows: "IN ANNO DO 1563 - QVI FVIT ANNI IMPERII FERDI COESA HVIVS NOMIN ET 12 ELECT EIVSD IMPERAT PRIMOGE FILII / ILLVSI RE ROM IMPE PRIN AC DOM IN REGEM ROM MAXIMIL / HOC OPVS NOVUM FVNDI CVRAVIT DOM JOANNES DVX MUNST SILE OLSN COME GLA".

These bells survived World War II military operations in Oleśnica, were not requisitioned for melting by the Third Reich, and were not removed by the Red Army. Their preservation may be attributed to their classification in category D (lowest priority for destruction) in wartime inventories, owing to their significant historical value.

In 1974, an electric bell-ringing system powered by three motors was installed. In January 2019, the bells were renovated by the company Rduch Bells & Clocks from Czernica. The project included fitting new linear drives and bell yokes that enable pendulum motion.

== Family mausolea ==
=== Poděbrady ===
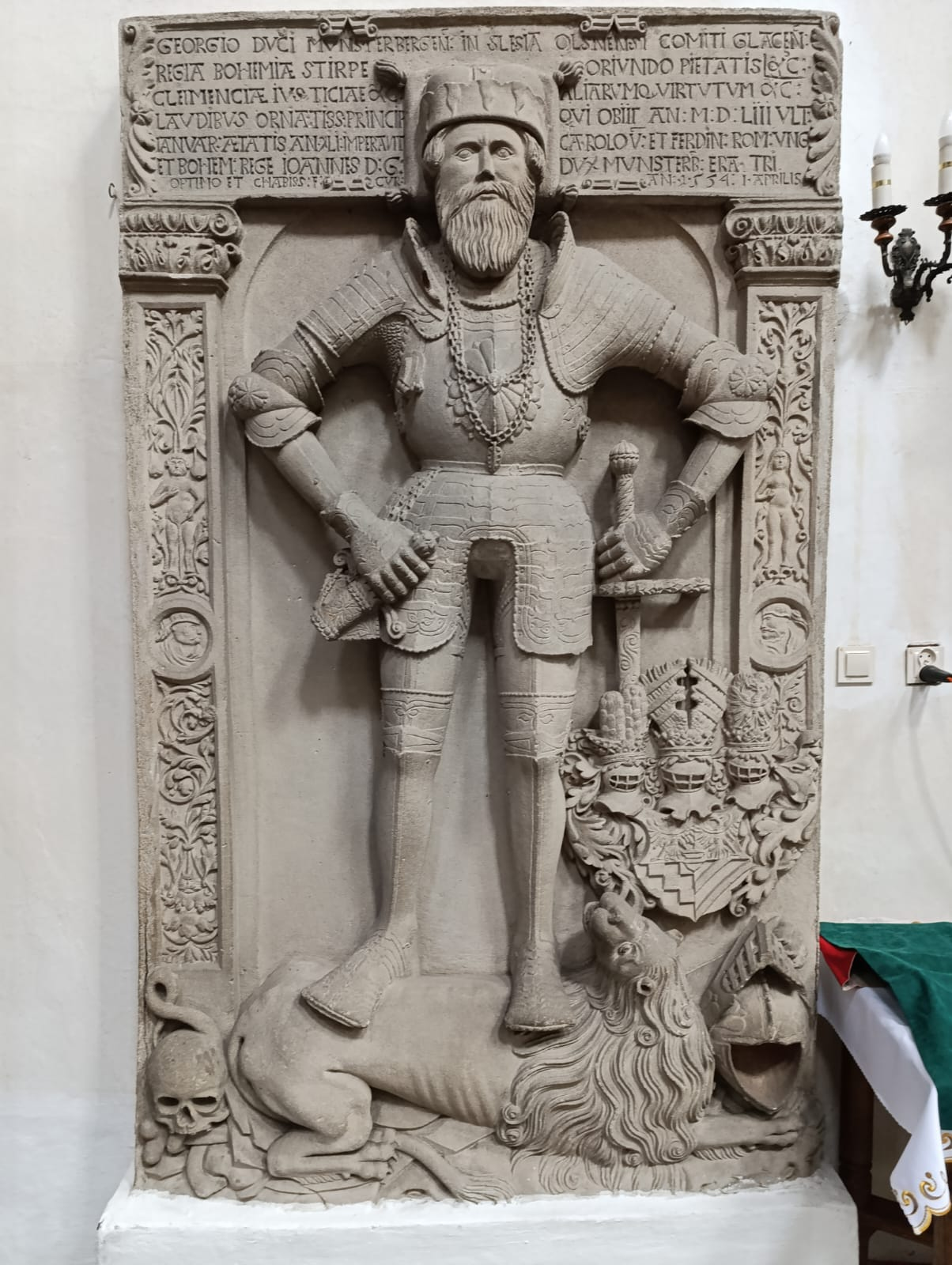
Tombstone of George II

The Poděbrady family established a crypt beneath the church chancel for their burials, likely during the reconstruction between 1500 and 1510. The first interment took place in 1513 (Magdalena, daughter of Duke Henry I). Until 1538, burials had occurred in the Cistercian nunnery, but this ceased after the expulsion of Catholic clergy from the duchy that year. Subsequently, 23 members of the Poděbrady family were laid to rest in the two-chamber crypt, which includes an extension.

The family mausoleum also encompasses the Renaissance tombstone of Duke George II. Crafted in sandstone in 1554 by Jan Oslew, it was commissioned by John of Poděbrady, the duke's brother. The life-size bas-relief depicts the duke in armor, holding a sword in his left hand and a misericorde in his right. He stands upon a lion, flanked by a helmet, a skull, and a serpent. Above the lion's head is the heraldic shield of the Duchy of Ziębice-Oleśnica. A Latin inscription above the figure reads:

GEORGIO. DUCI. MUNSTERBERGEN. IN. SLESIA. OLSENSI. COMITI. GLACEN. ETC. REGIA. BOHEMIAE. STIRPE. ORIVNDO. PIETATIS. CLEMENCIAE. IVSTICIAE. ETC. ALIARUMQ. VIRTVTVM. ETC. LAVDIBVS. ORNATISS. PRINCIPI. QVI. OBIIT. AN. MD. LIII. VLT. IANVAR. AETATIS. AN. XLI. IMPERANTE. CAROLO. V. ET. FERDIN. ROM. VNG. ET. BOHEM. REGE. IOANNES. D. G. DUX MVNSTERB. FRATRI. OPTIMO. ET. CHARISS. F. CVR. AN. 1554. 1. APRILIS.

=== Tomb of John of Münsterberg-Oels and Krystyna Szydłowiecka ===
Another element of the mausoleum is a Renaissance tomb, the execution of which in 1557 was commissioned from Oslew by Duke John after the death of his wife, Krystyna Szydłowiecka. Until the second half of the 19th century, the tomb was located in front of the main altar, to later be moved to the Württemberg chapel. The tomb depicts two figures lying parallel to each other. Under the duke's feet is a lioness, and under the duchess a lion (until the early 20th century the animals were placed reversed, correctly). On the walls of the stone chest are placed inscriptions commemorating the duke and duchess and a poetic inscription.

==== Coats of arms ====
- On the side of the ducal couple's feet are the coats of arms of:
  - Anna of Sagan (mother of John and wife of Charles I);
  - the Duchy of Münsterberg (Poděbrady);
  - Ursula of Brandenburg (John's grandmother, 1450–1508).
- On the side of the ducal couple's heads are the coats of arms of:
  - Krystyna Szydłowiecka (quartered);
  - Isabella of Sicily;
  - Anna of Koldic (1405–1450);
  - Salomea of Častolovice (1426–1489).
Coat of arms of Anna of Sagan

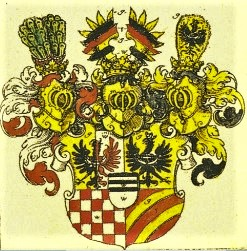
Coat of arms of the Duchy of Münsterberg

Coat of arms of Ursula of Brandenburg

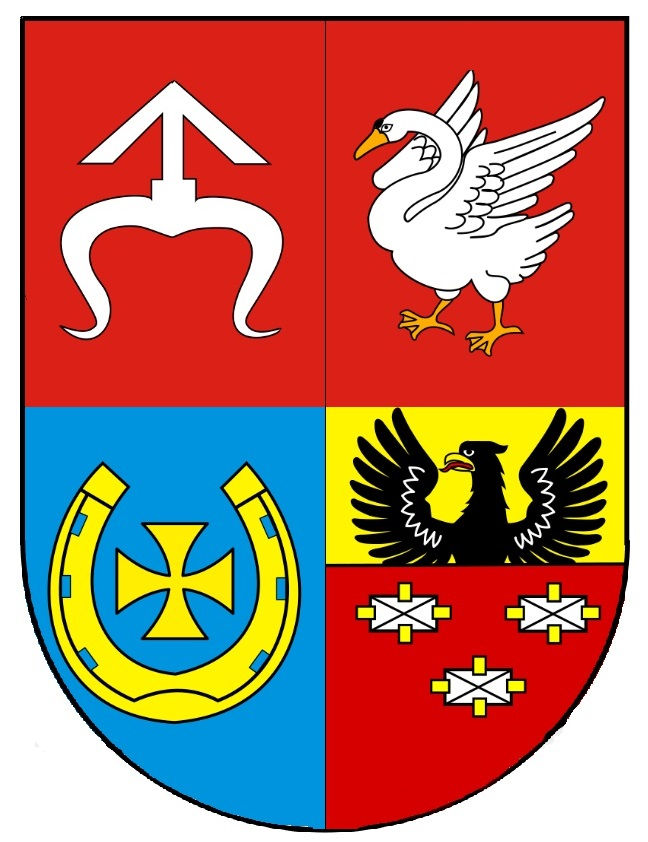
Coat of arms of Krystyna Szydłowiecka

Coat of arms of Isabella of Sicily

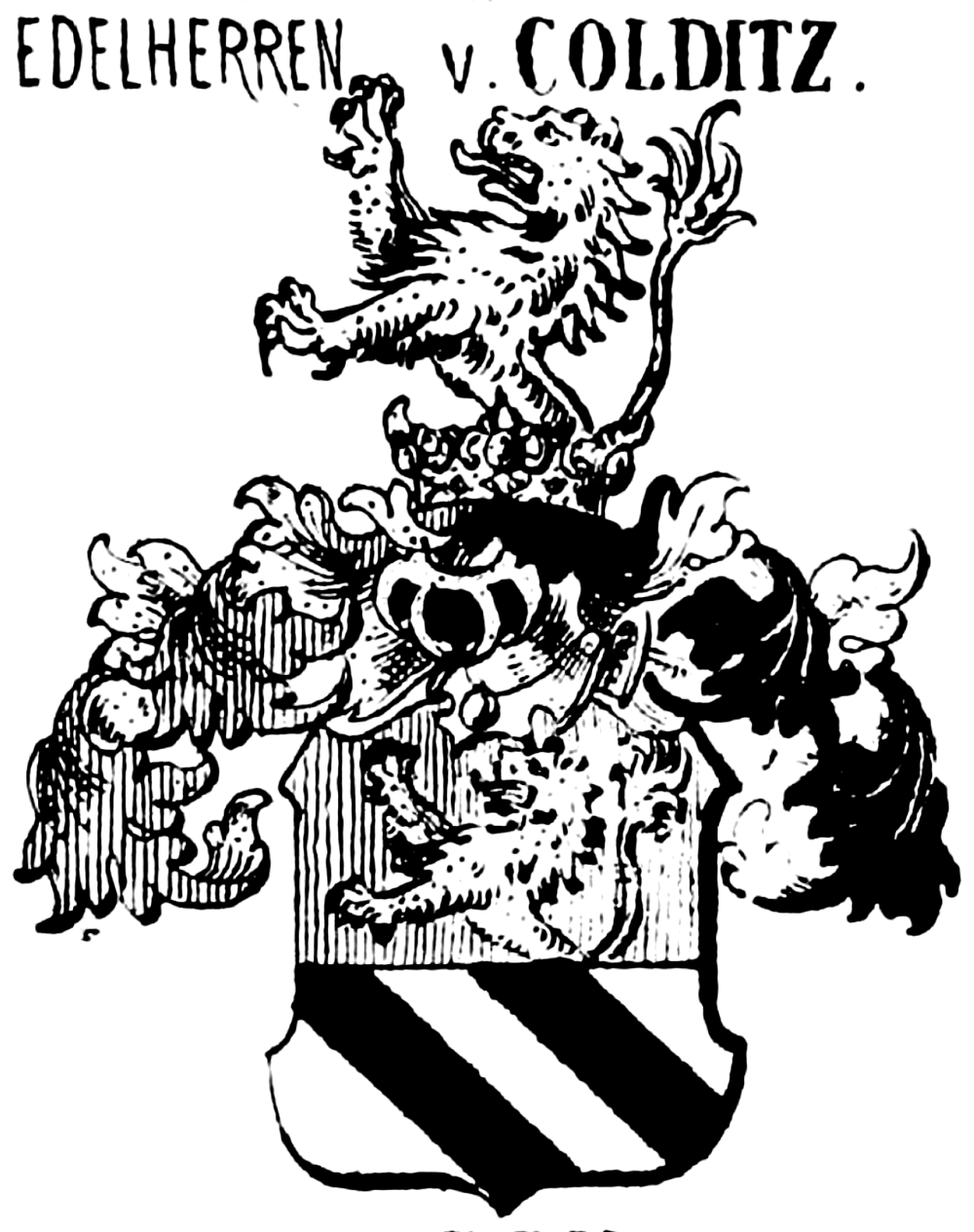
Coat of arms of Anna of Koldic

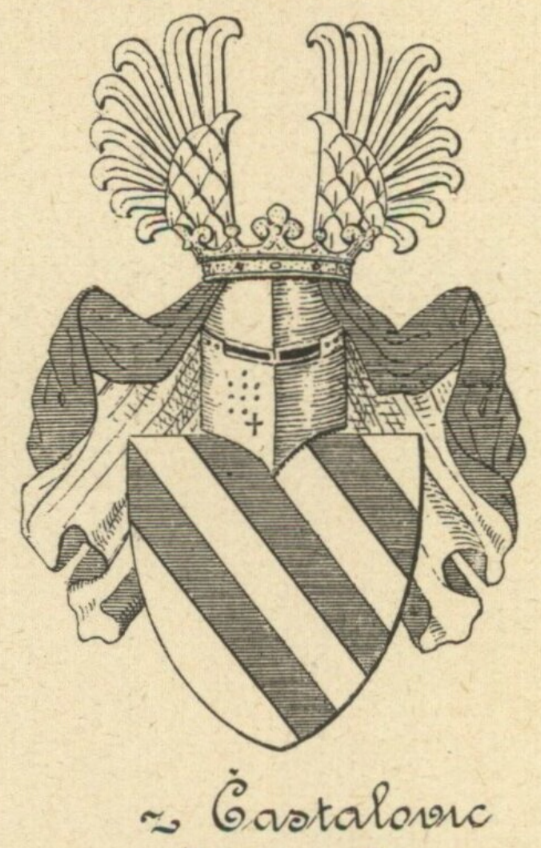
Coat of arms of Salomea of Častolovice
- On Duke John's side are the coats of arms of:
  - Kunigunde of Sternberg (wife of King George of Poděbrady);
  - Margaret of Baden (variant);
  - Anna of Vartenberg (b. 1402);
  - Ursula of Lorraine;
  - Anna of Wildhardiz.
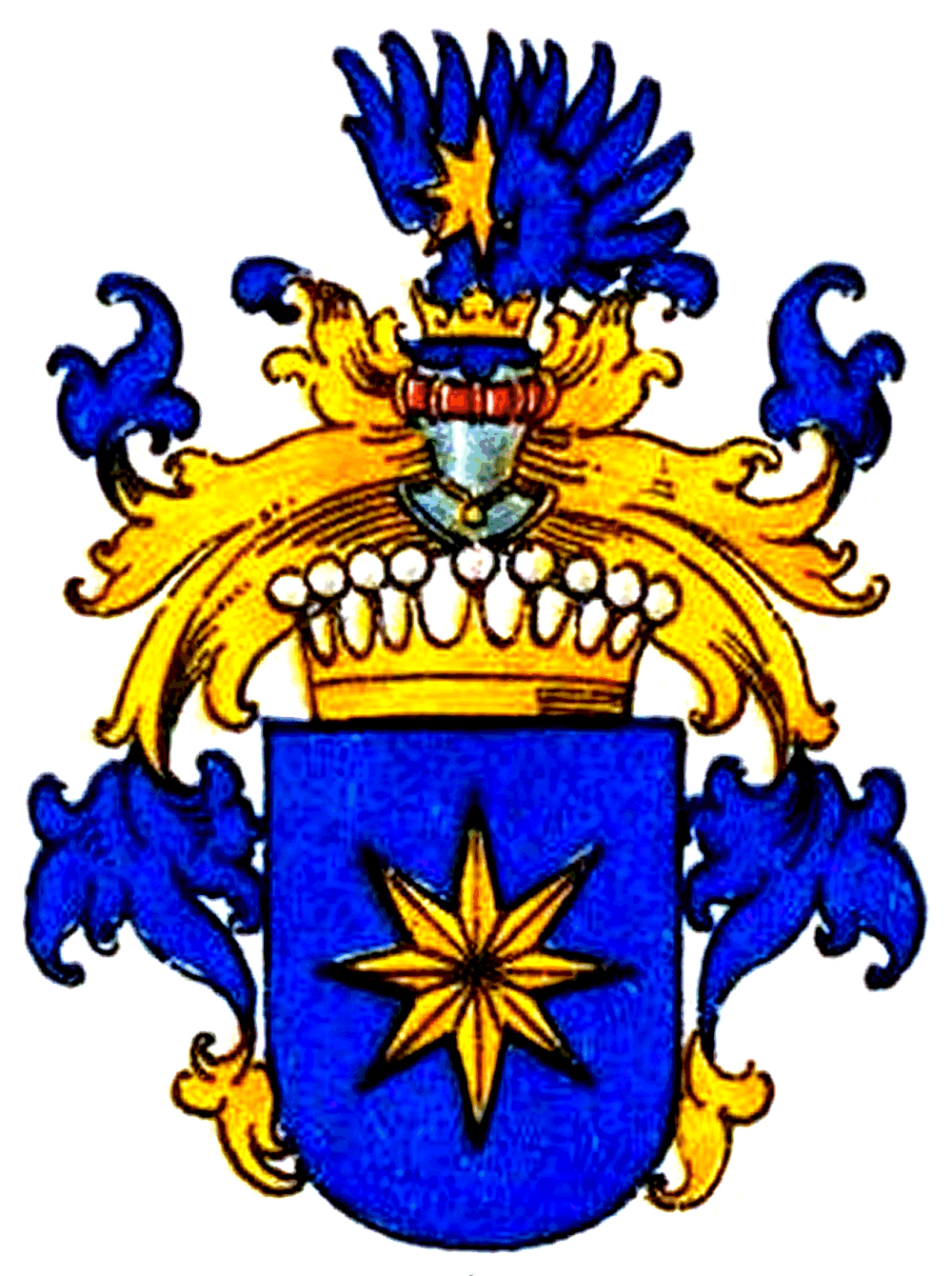
Coat of arms of Kunigunde of Sternberg

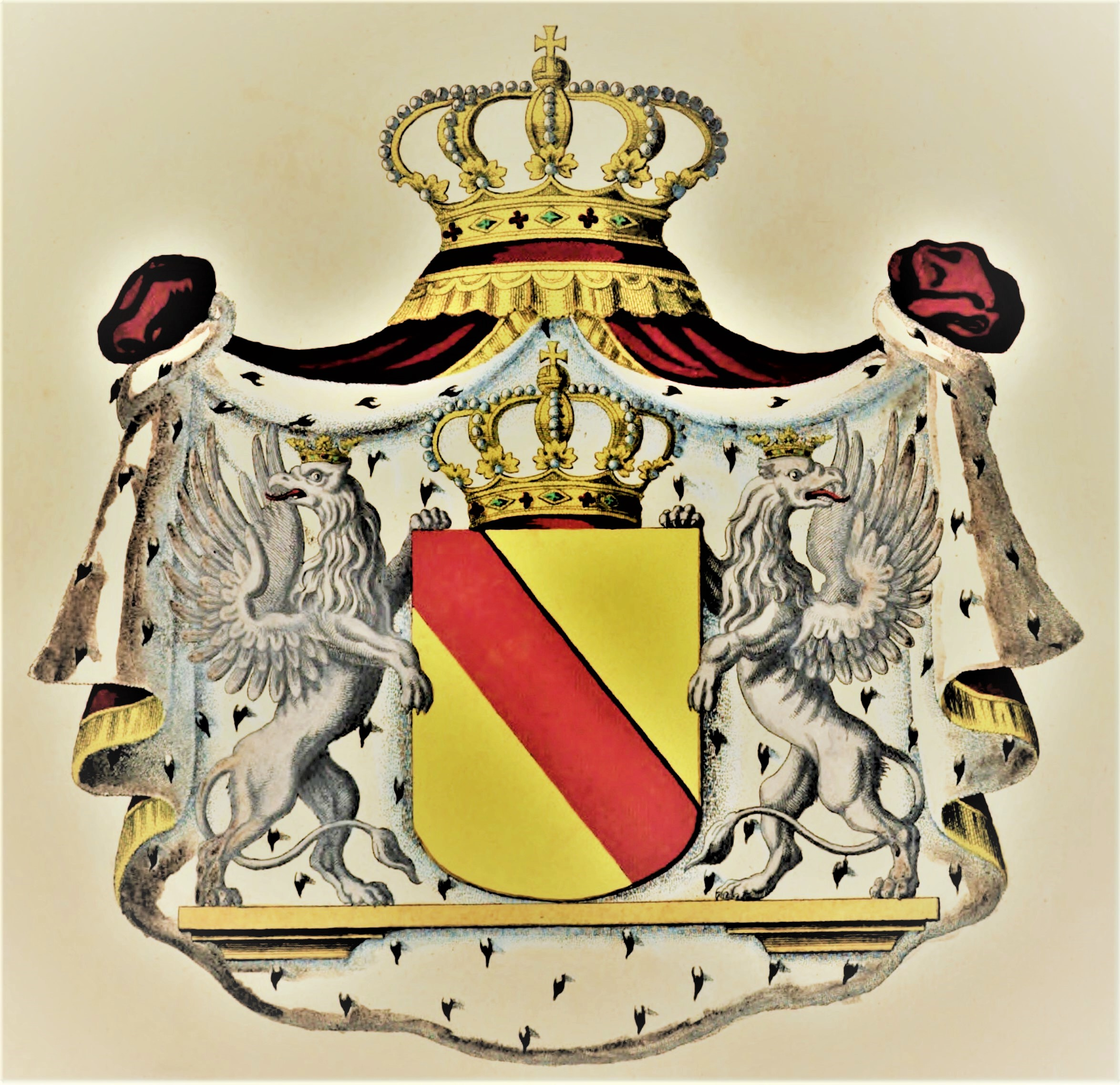
Coat of arms of Margaret of Baden (variant)

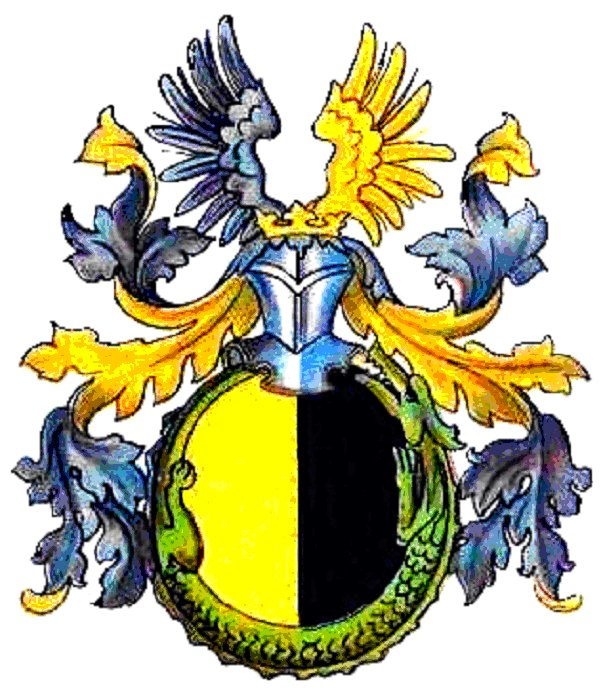
Coat of arms of Anna of Vartenberg

Coat of arms of Ursula of Lorraine

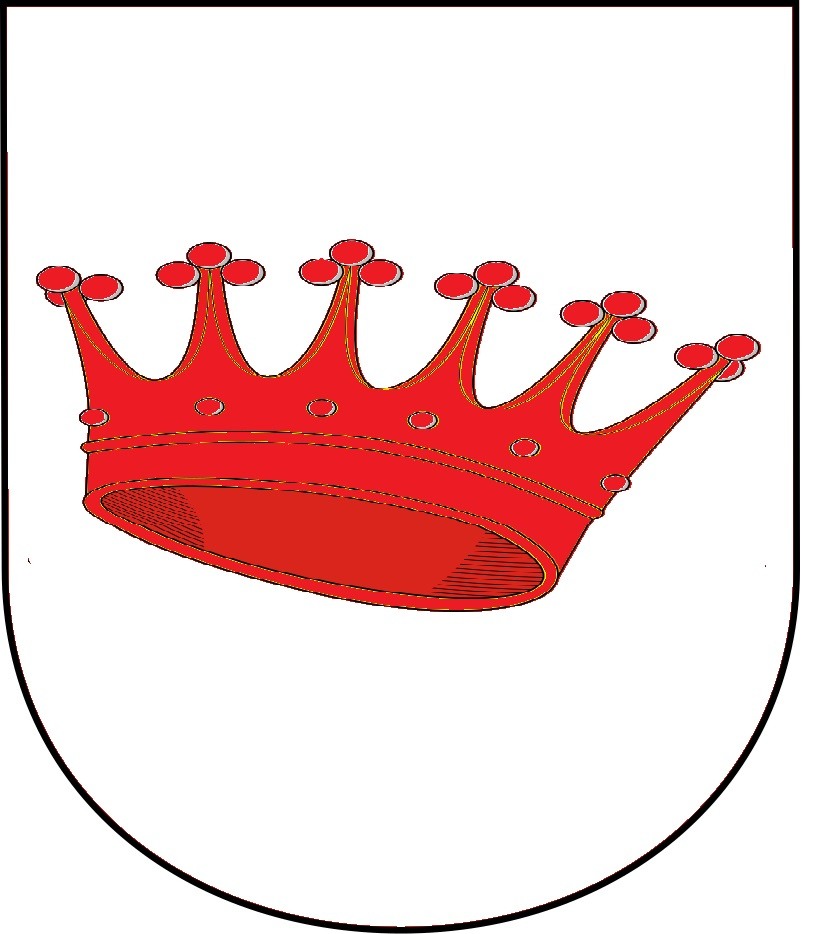
Coat of arms of Anna of Wildhardiz

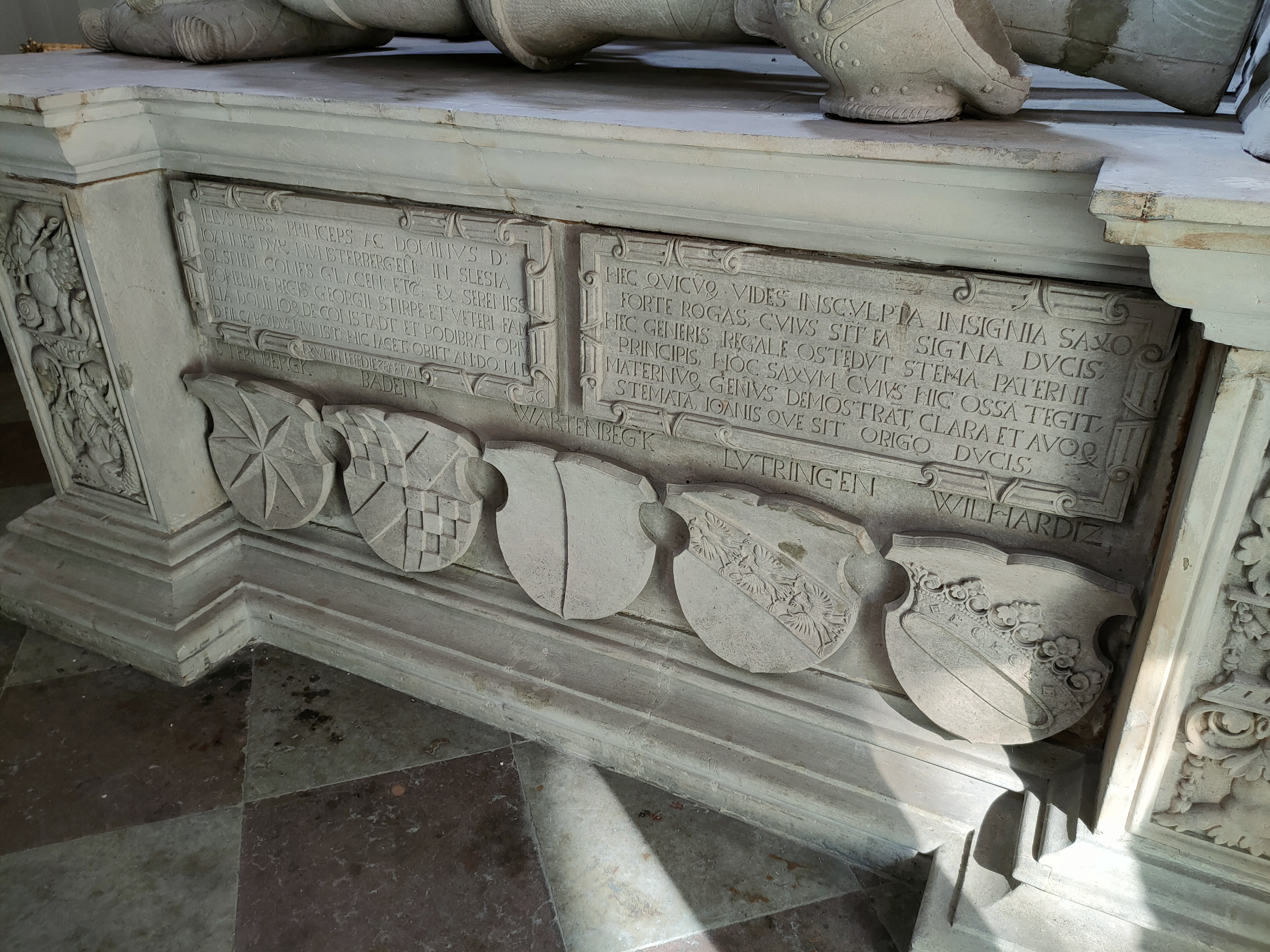
Fragment of Duke John's tomb
- On Duchess Krystyna's side are the coats of arms of:
  - Katarzyna of Münsterberg (1390–1422);
  - Katarzyna of Troppau;
  - Anna of Thuringia;
  - Scholastica of Saxony;
  - Euphemia of Bytom.
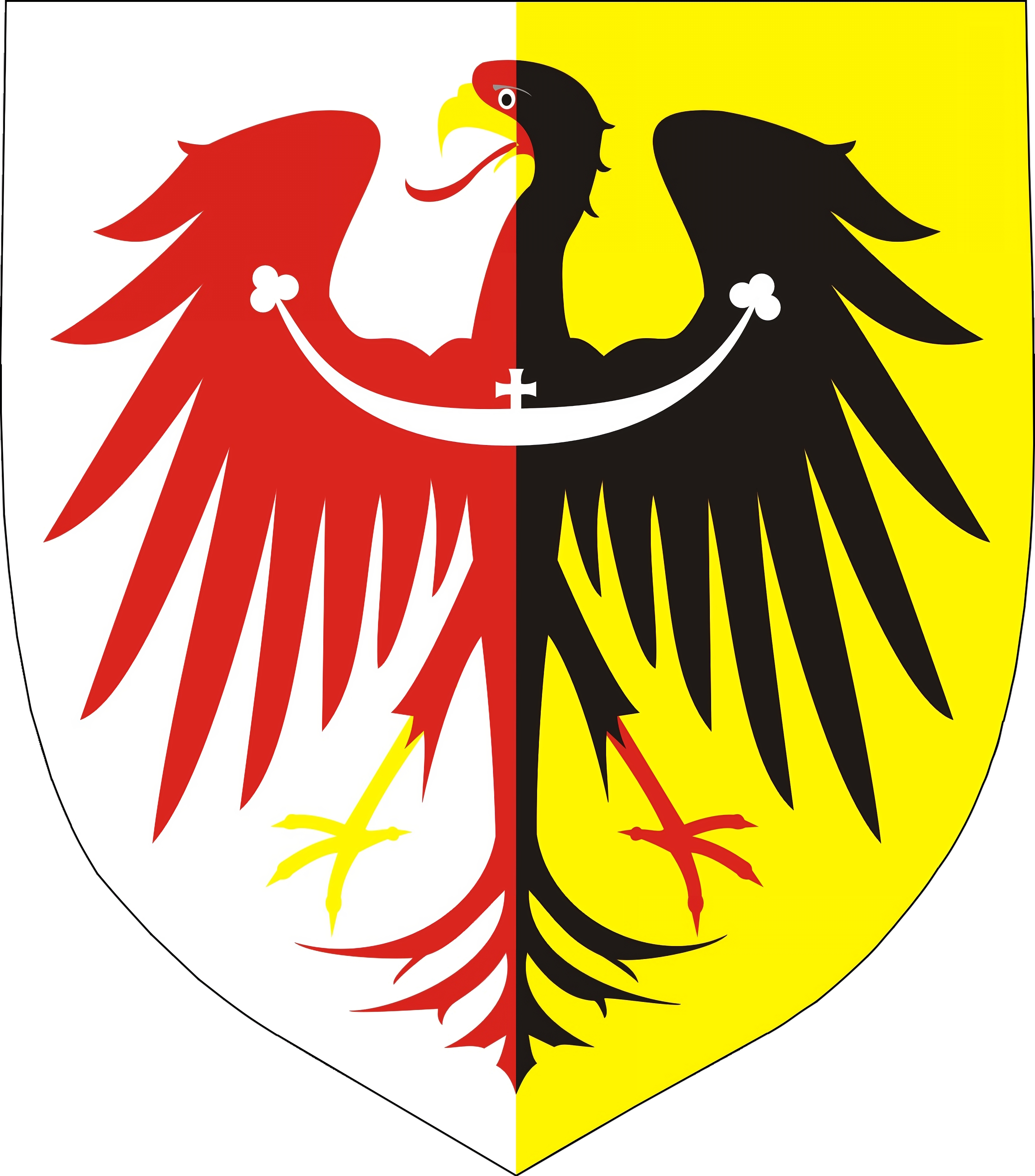
Coat of arms of Katarzyna of Münsterberg

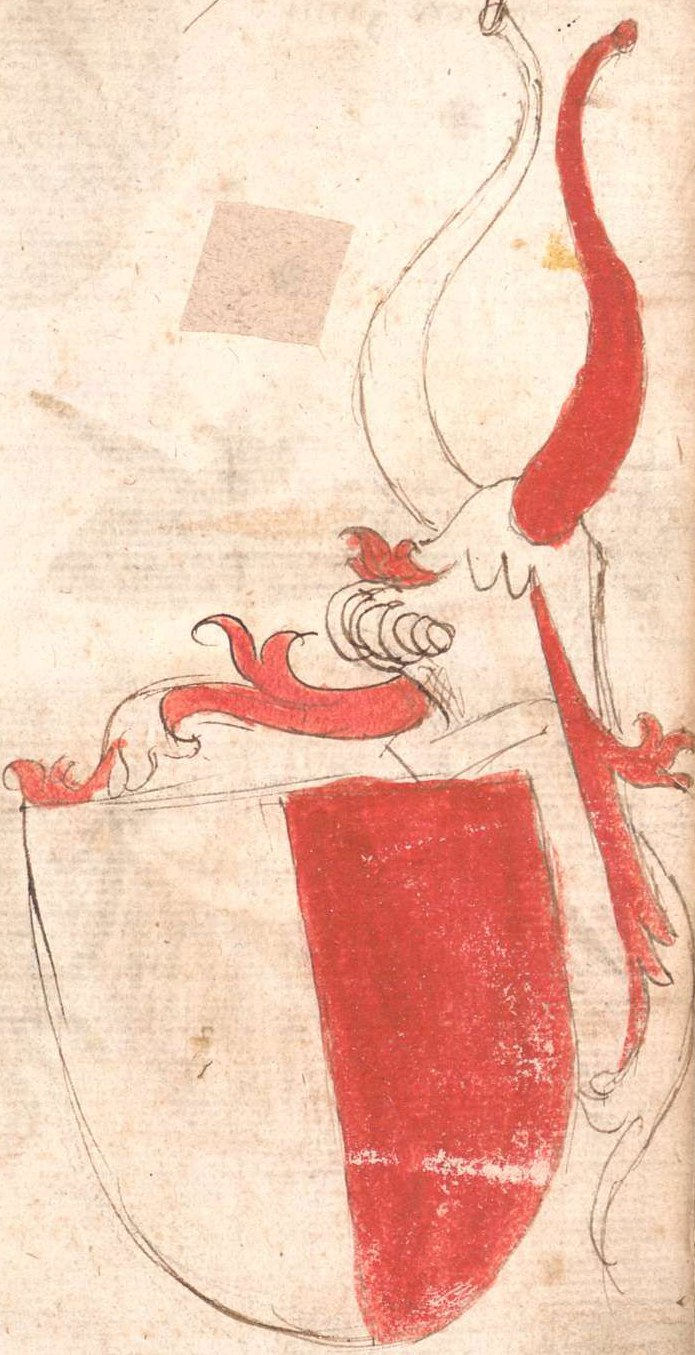
Coat of arms of Katarzyna of Troppau

Coat of arms of Anna of Thuringia

Coat of arms of Scholastica of Saxony

Coat of arms of Euphemia of Bytom

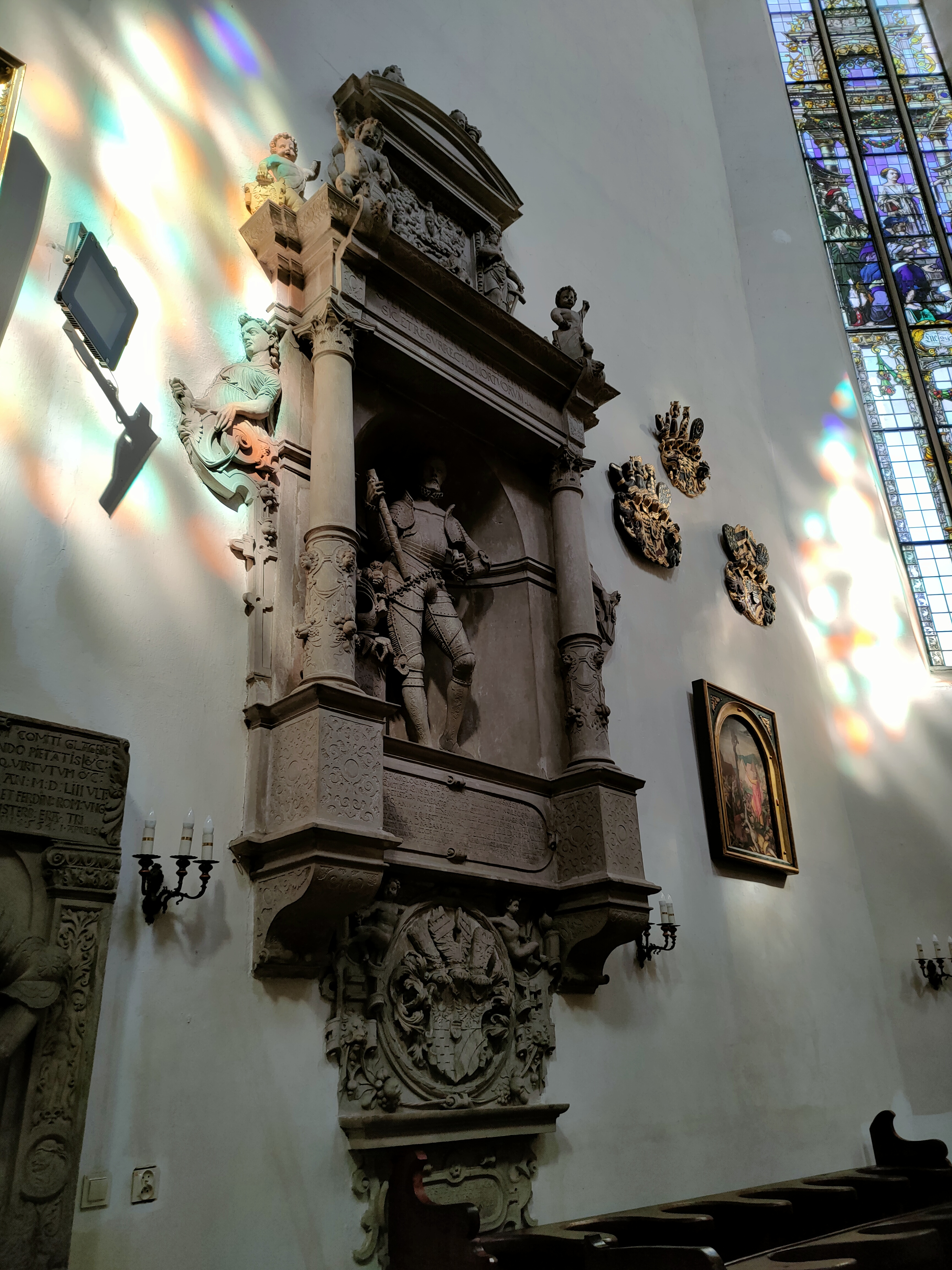
Tomb of Karl Christoph

On the north wall of the chancel, to the right of George II's slab, stands the tomb of Duke Karl Christoph. Created in 1579 and funded by Barbara von Biberstein (granddaughter of Charles I), the monument features a life-size armored figure of the prince in a niche. Flanking columns support an entablature with angels and a relief of the Resurrection of Jesus. The frieze bears an inscription from the First Epistle to the Corinthians, and the base displays the ducal coat of arms.

=== Württembergs ===
Due to limited space for further burials in the Poděbrady crypt, Duke Christian Ulrich I initiated construction of the family chapel for the Württembergs in 1698, with completion in 1700. Added to the south side of the church adjoining the chancel, the chapel immediately received 13 family sarcophagi previously housed in the Poděbrady crypt. The final burial in the crypt occurred in 1761 (Charles of Württemberg-Bernstadt). In total, 24 sarcophagi were placed there: 15 metal (including two unique tin examples for Sylvius Nimrod and Elisabeth Marie) and nine wooden.

The crypt was permanently closed in 1952. In 2003, it was reopened, with wooden coffins secured against further deterioration and the walls renovated. In 2022, the gilded and polychromed sarcophagus of Duke Sylvius Nimrod, regarded as a funerary art of European significance, was opened, revealing signs of a prior break-in and containing shoes and silk garments. It was subsequently sent for restoration by A.T. Pracownia Konserwacji Zabytków Agnieszki i Tomasza Trzosów, which was completed that year. In 2023, conservation work was carried out on the sarcophagus of Elisabeth Marie, during which valuables and clothing elements were recovered.

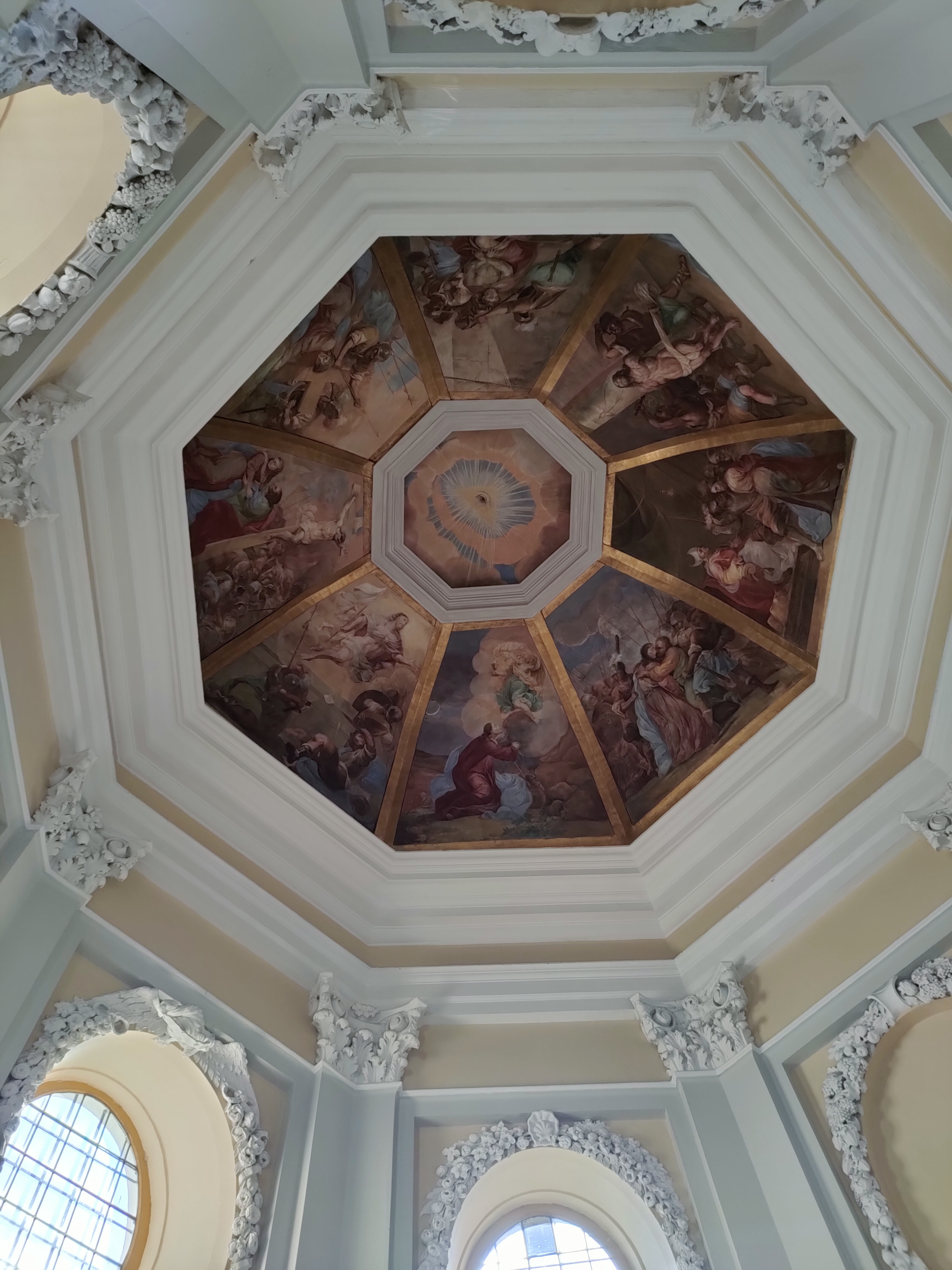
Chapel vault

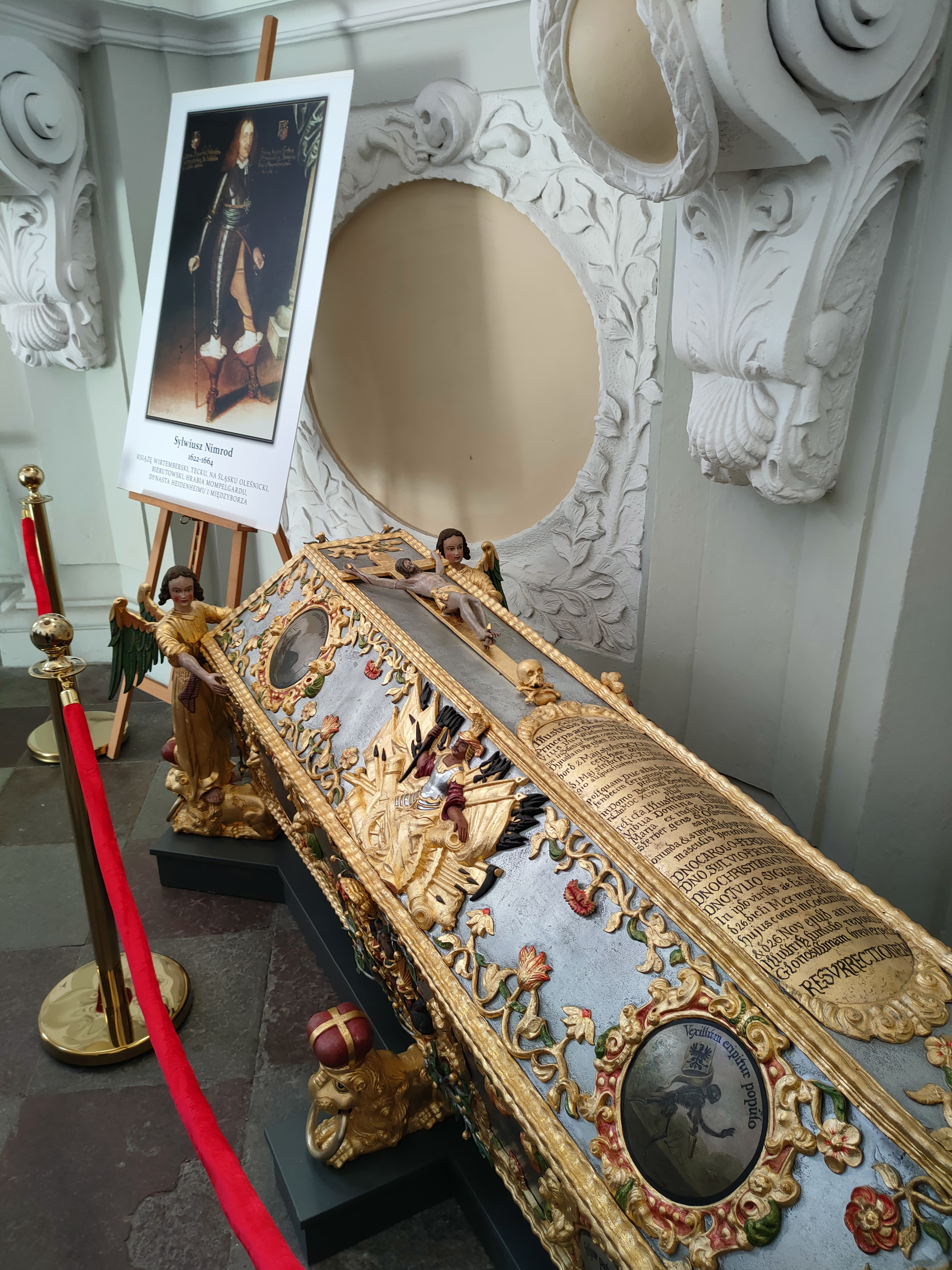
Restored sarcophagus of Sylvius Nimrod

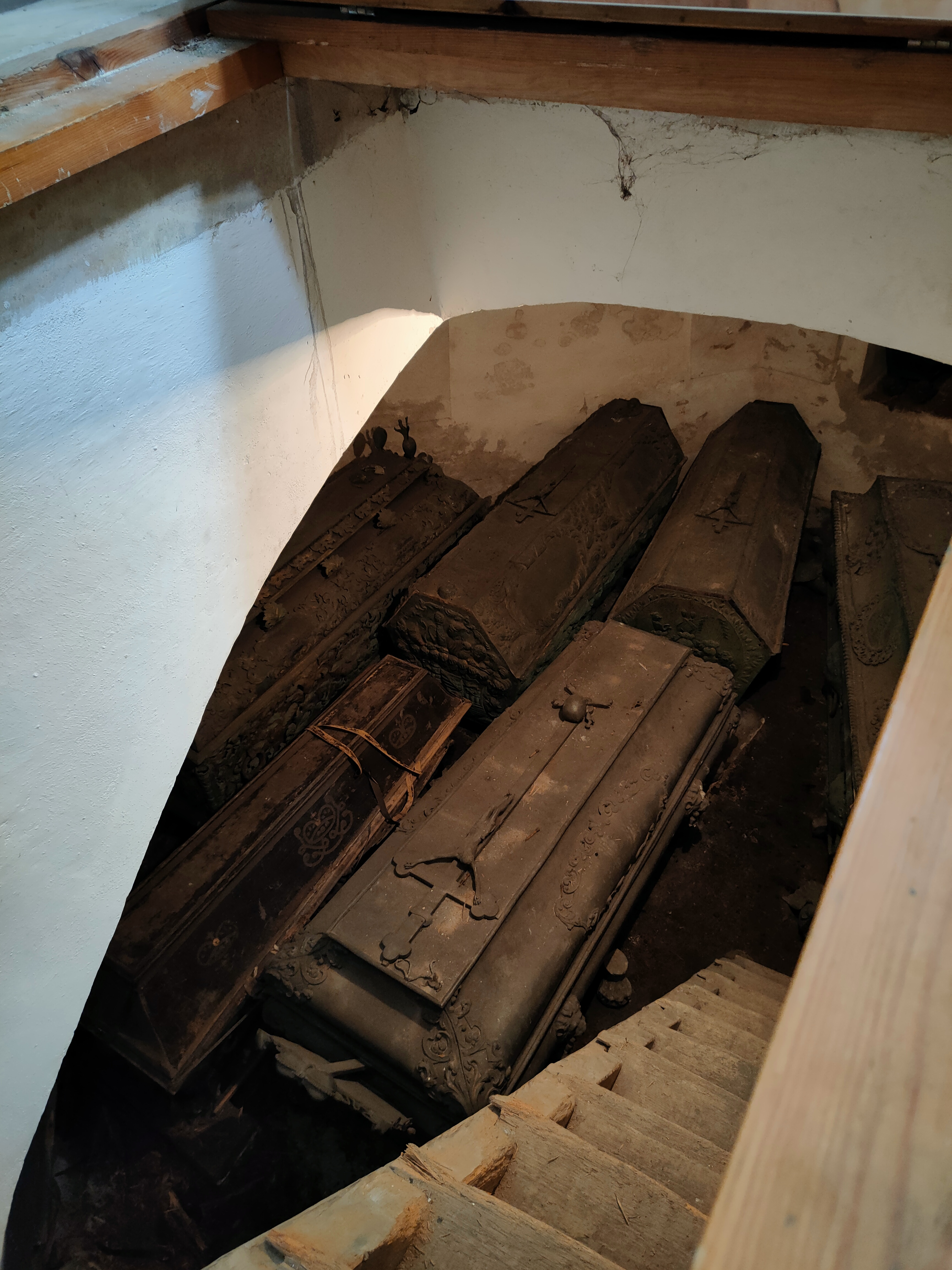
Interior of the crypt

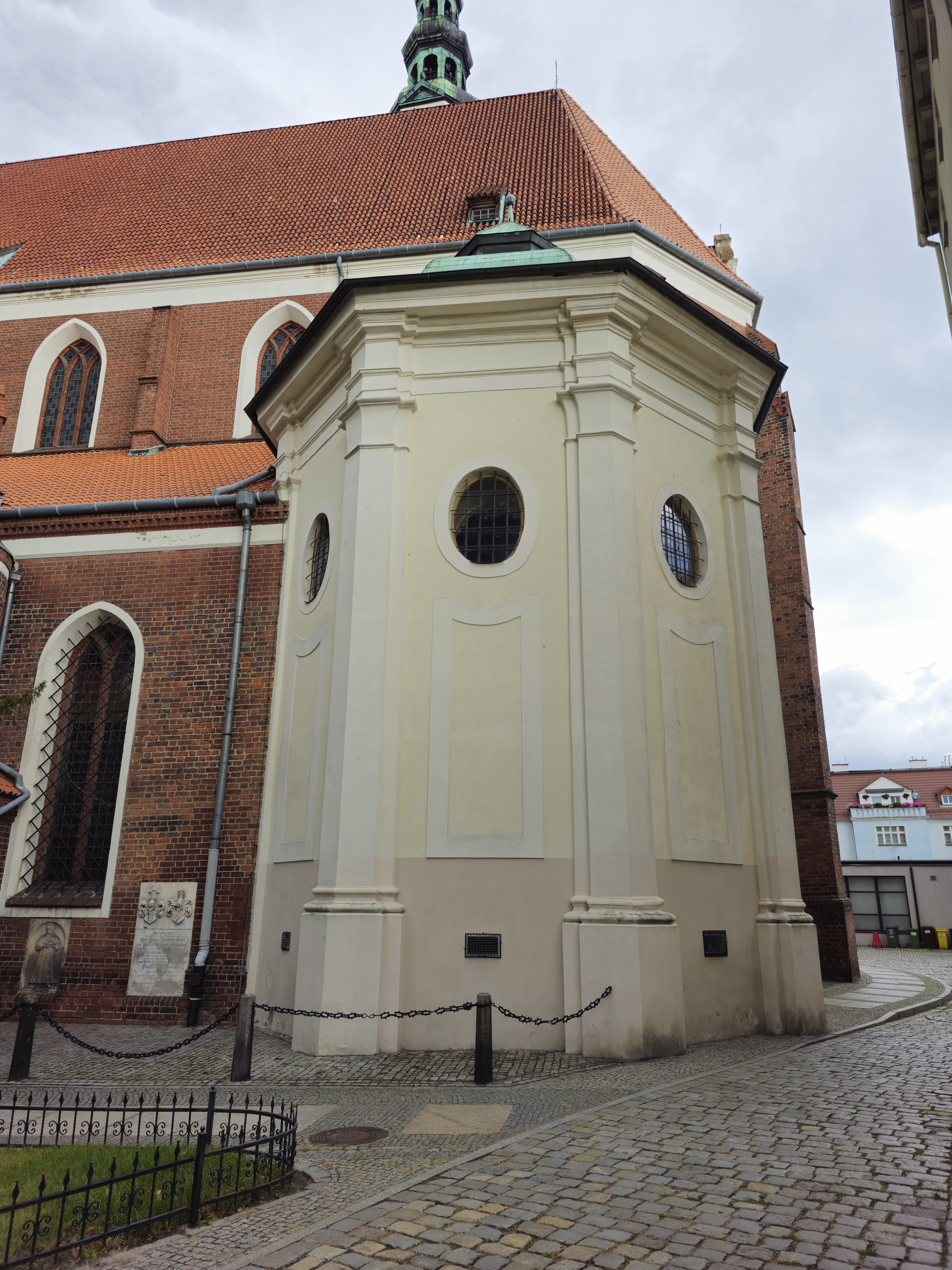
Württemberg chapel

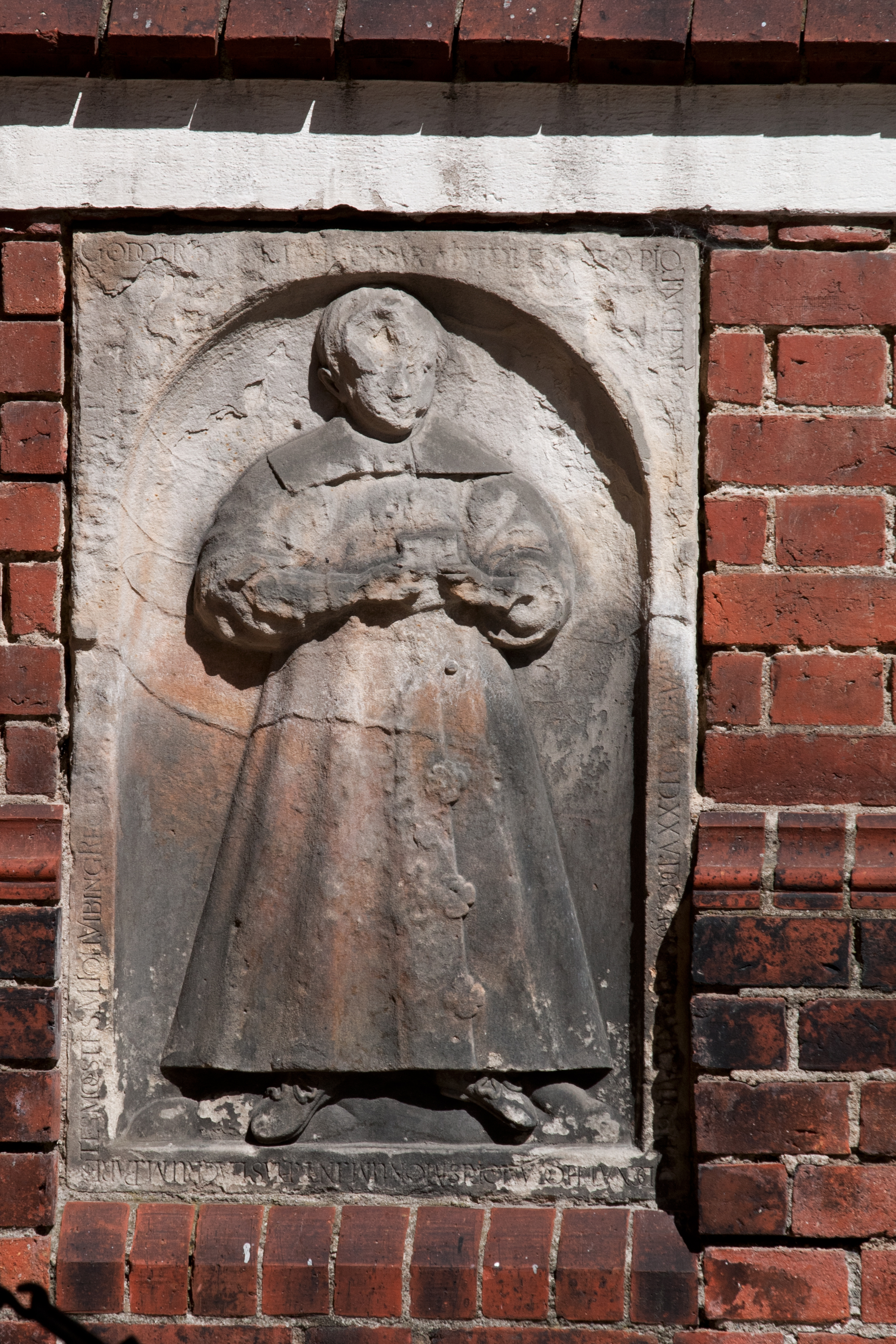
Gravestone slab in the basilica wall

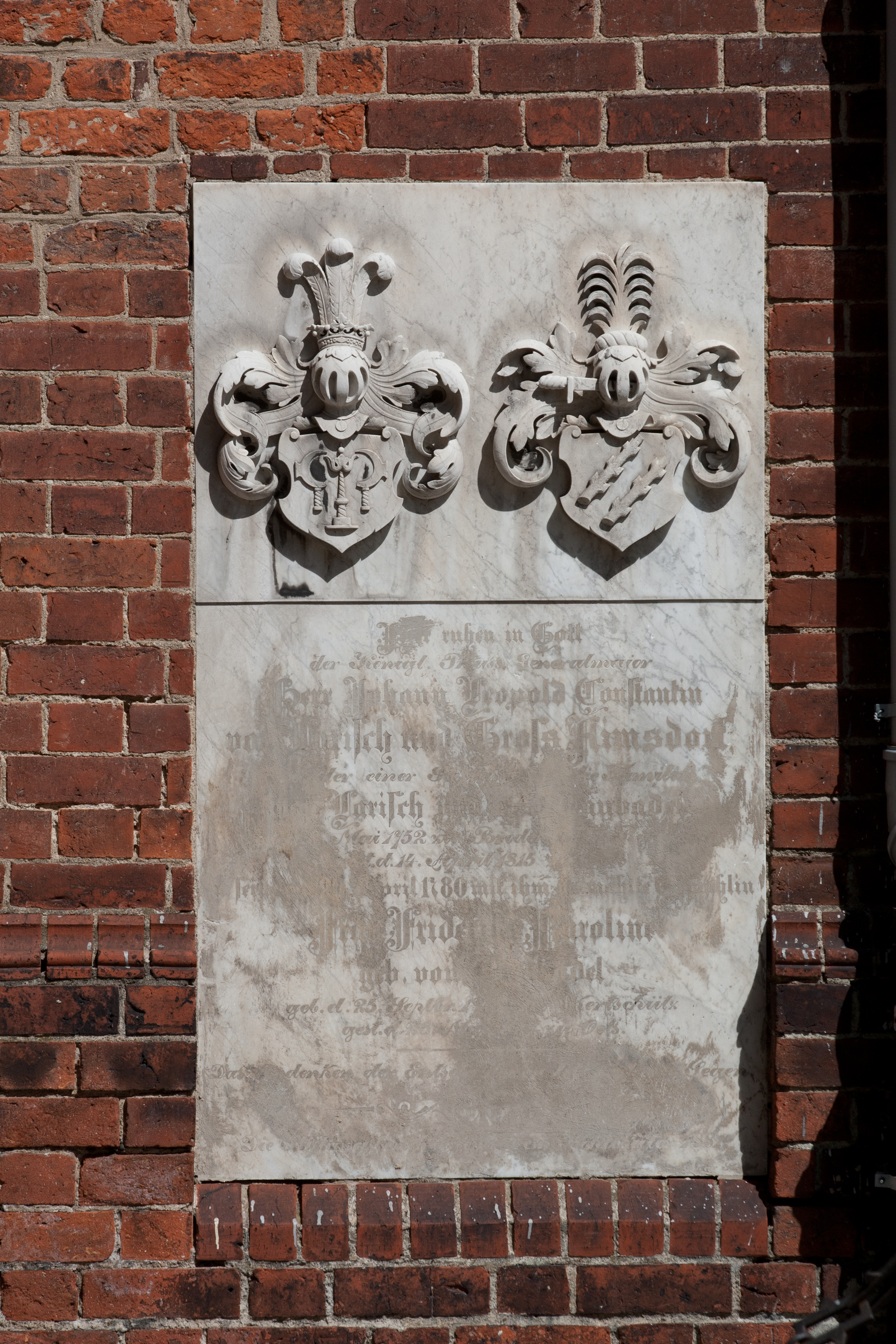
Gravestone slab in the basilica wall

== Gallery ==
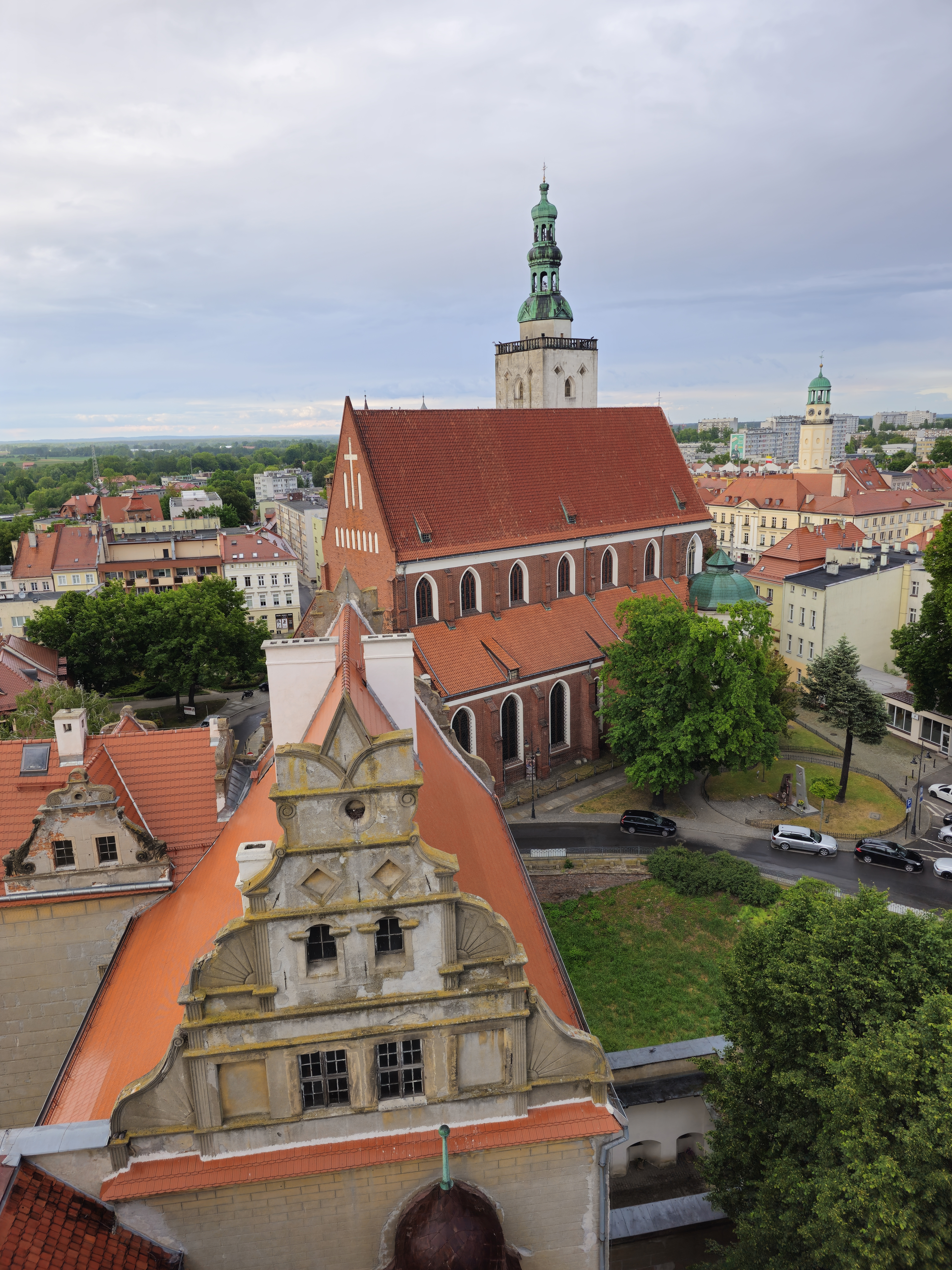
View from the tower onto the Widows' Palace and the basilica

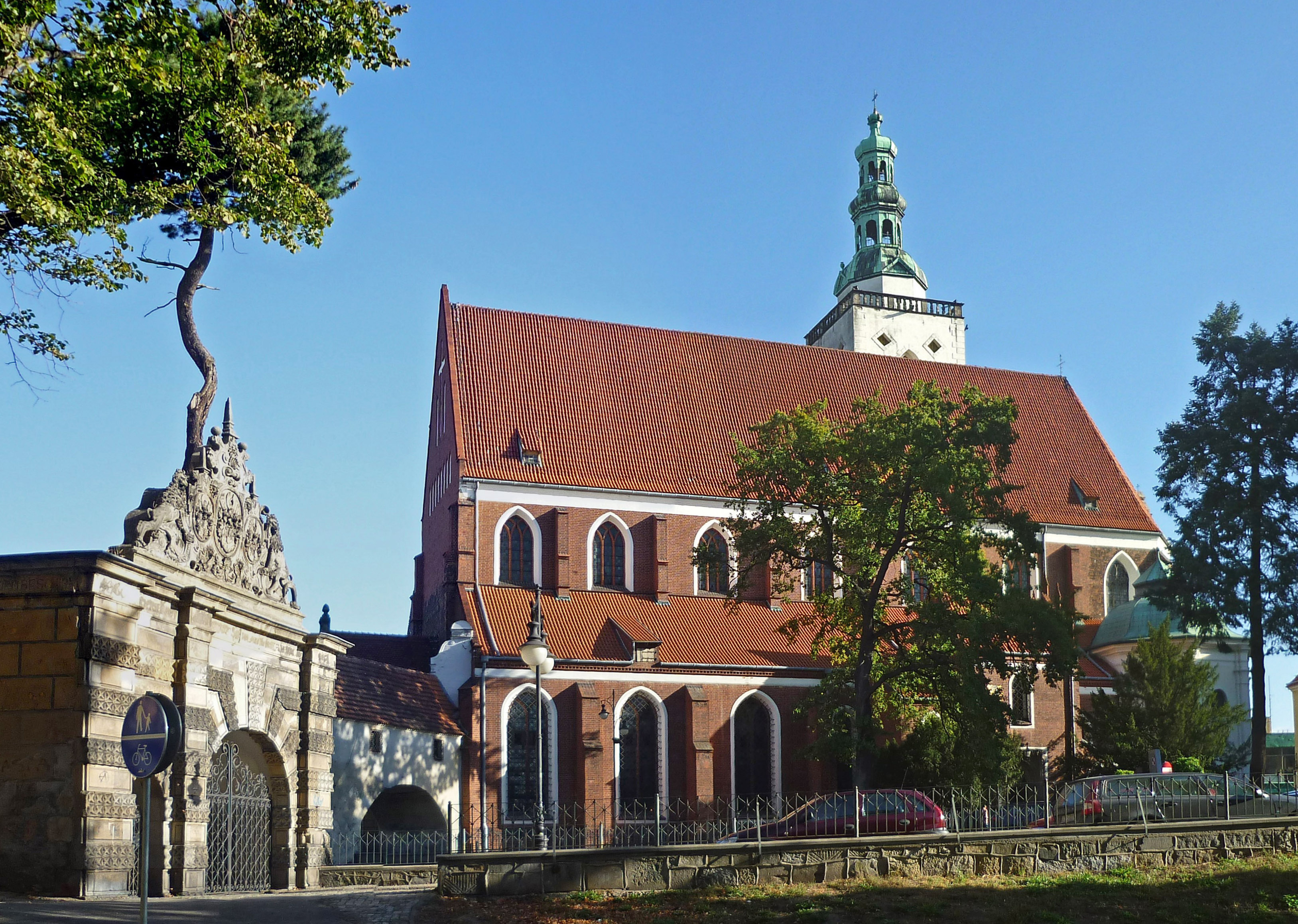
View from the south side

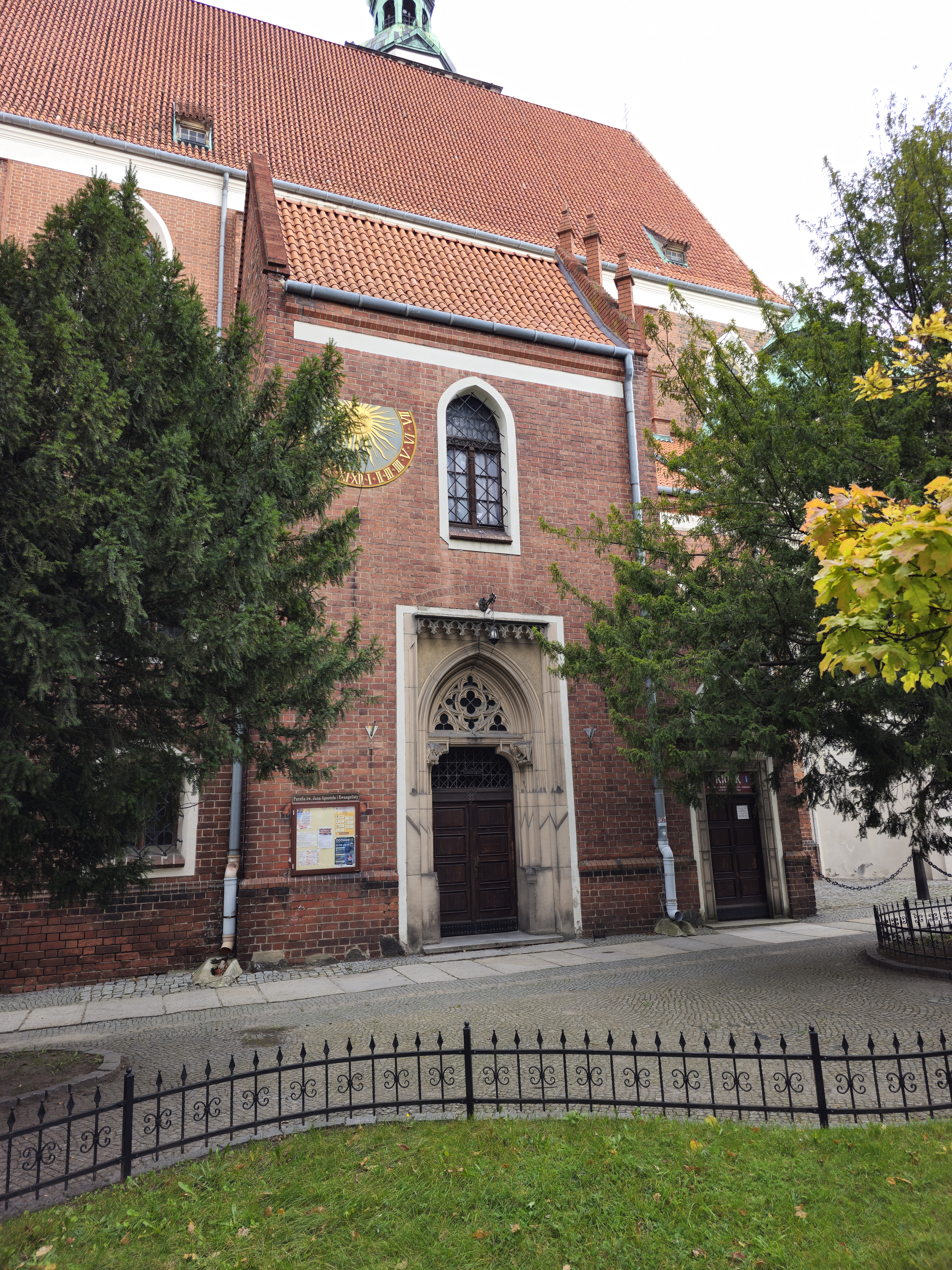
Southern church porch

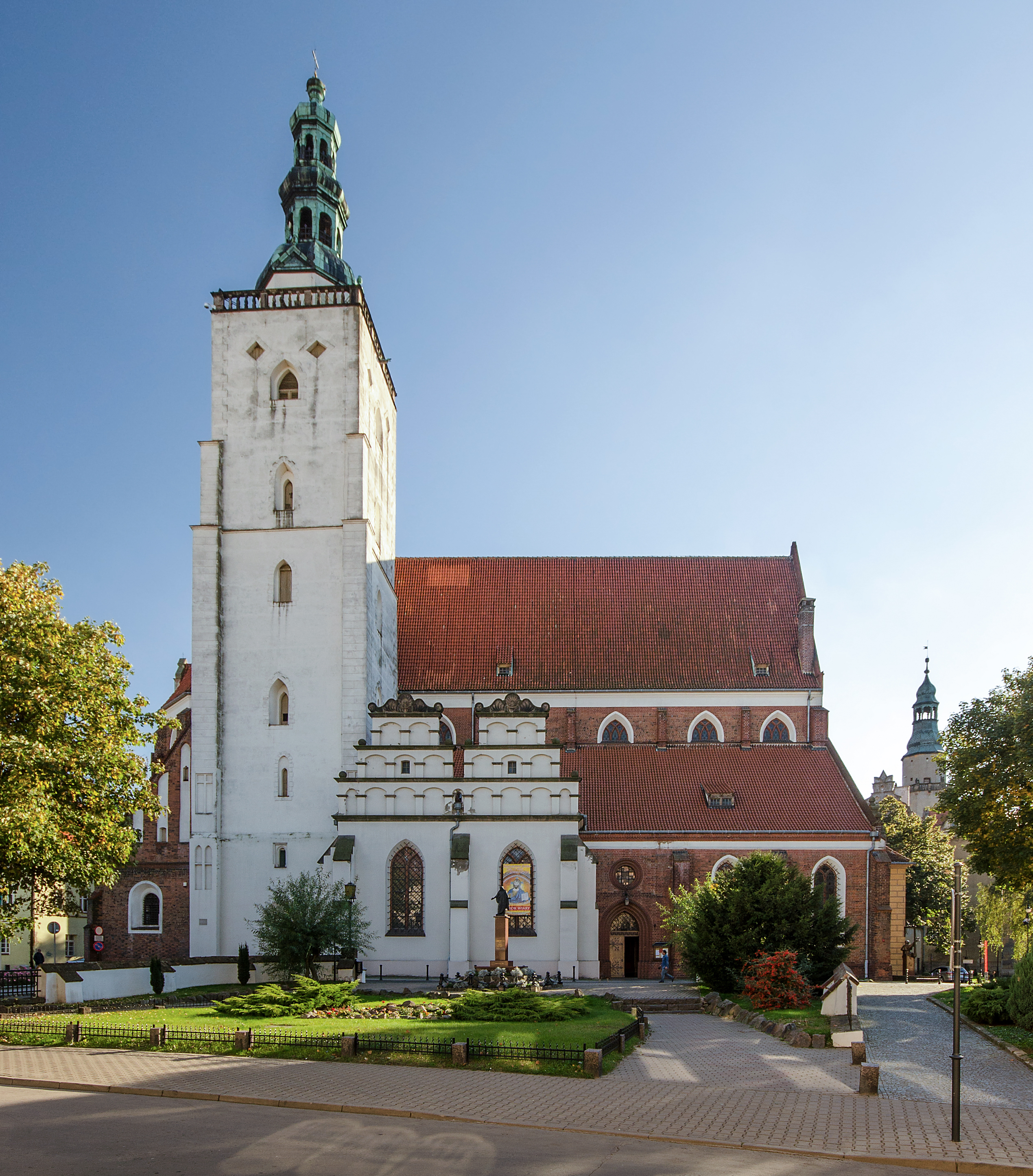
View from the north side

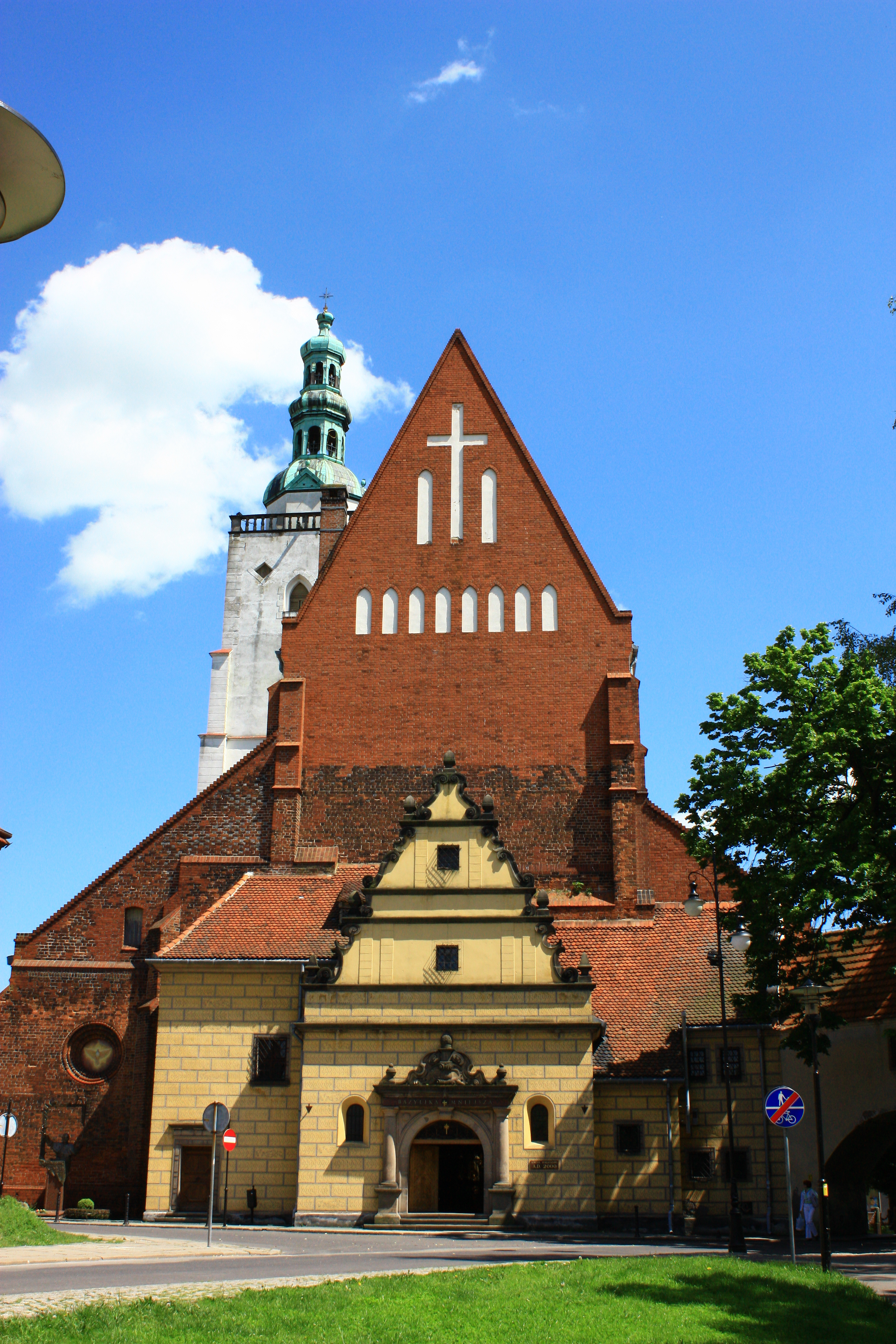
View from the west

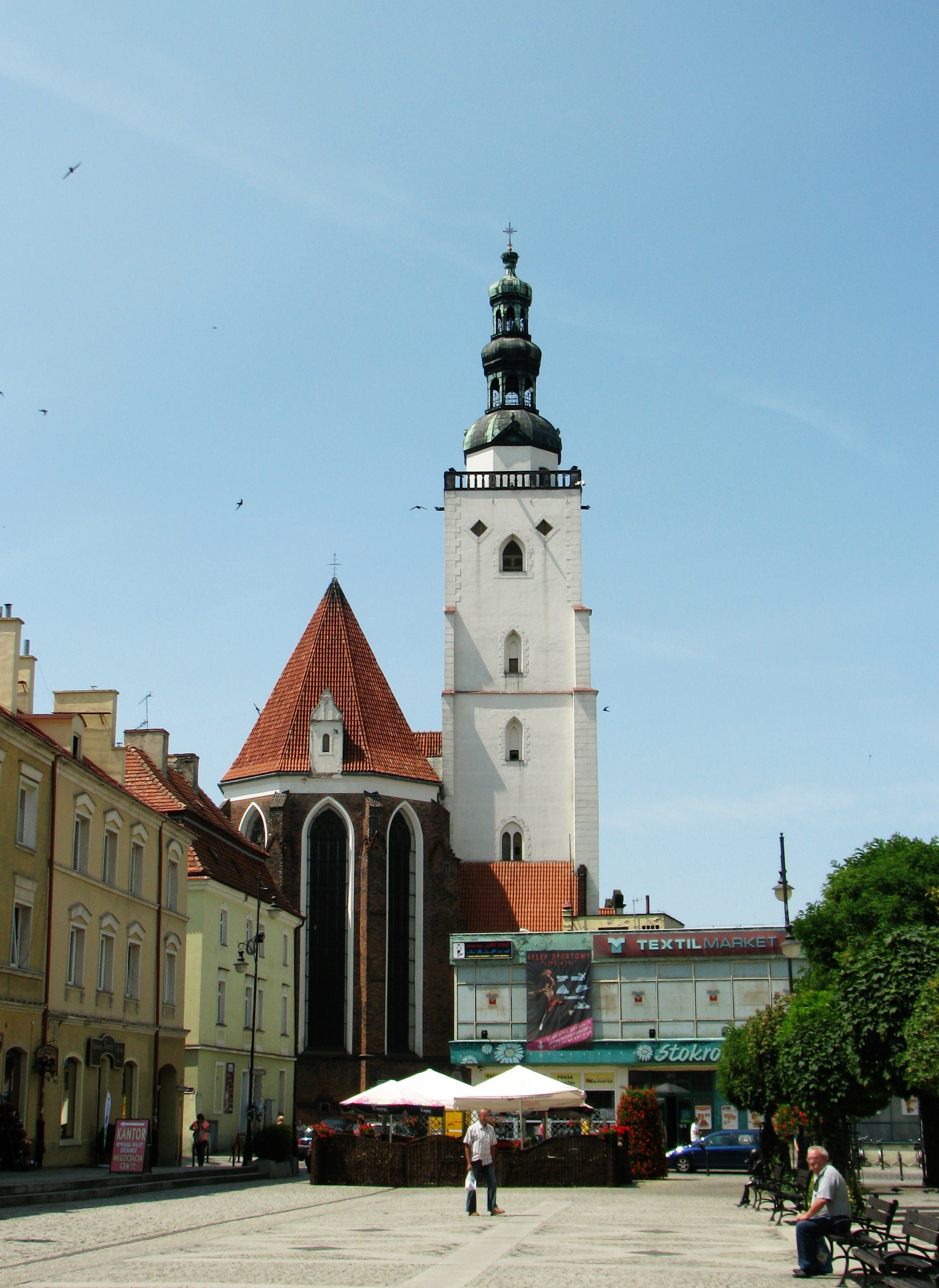
View from the east onto the chancel and tower

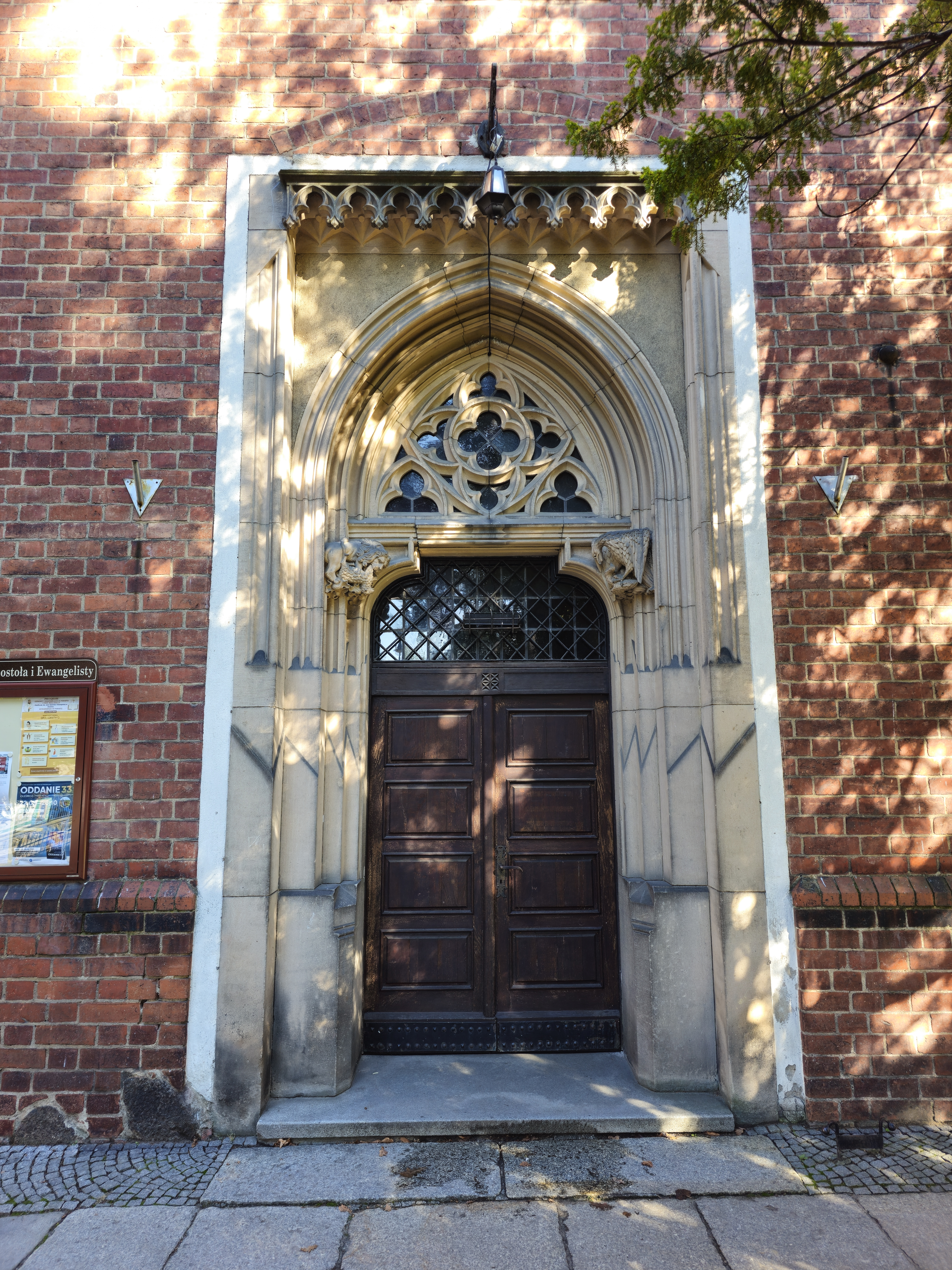
Entrance portal to the southern church porch

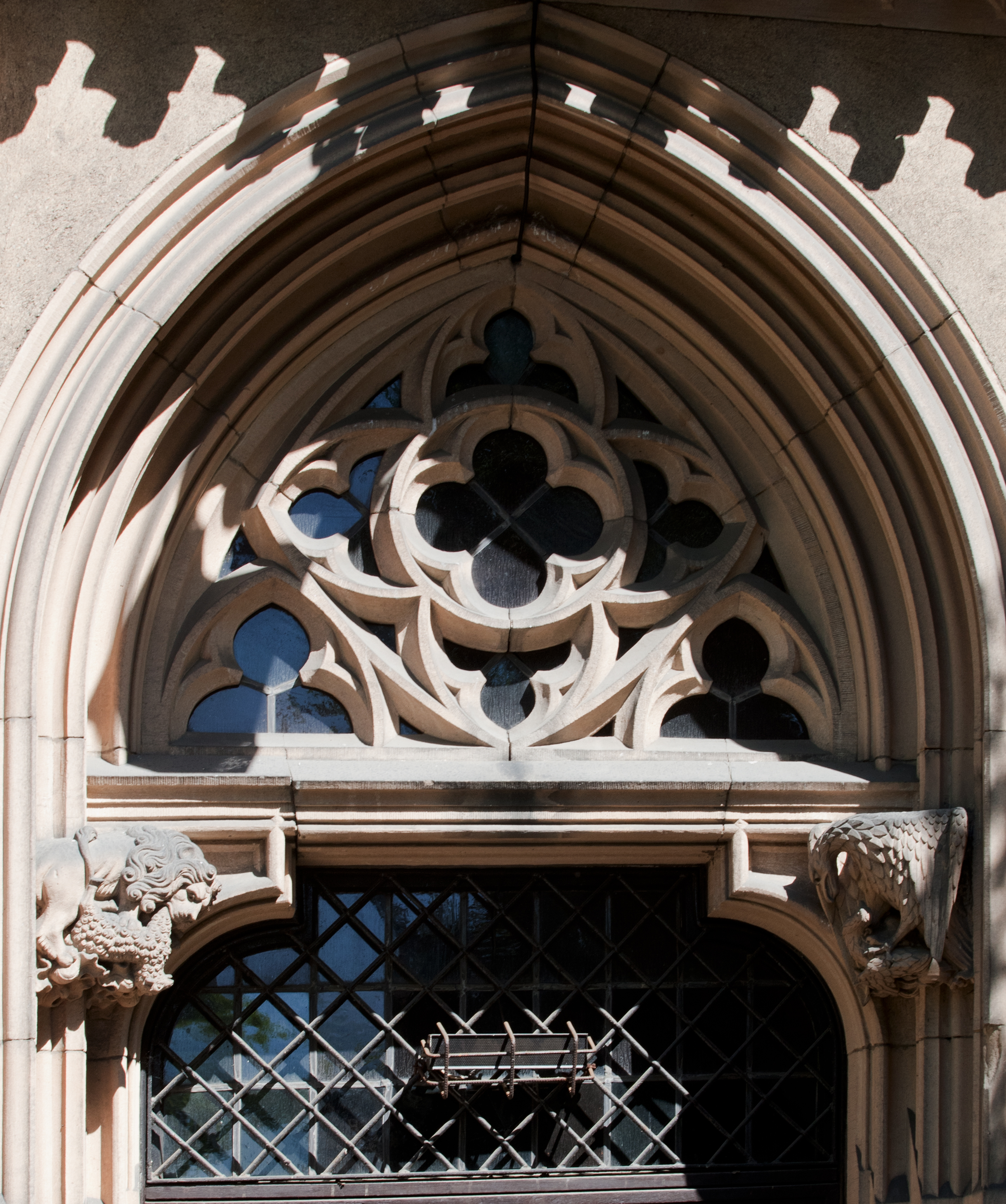
Decorative portal

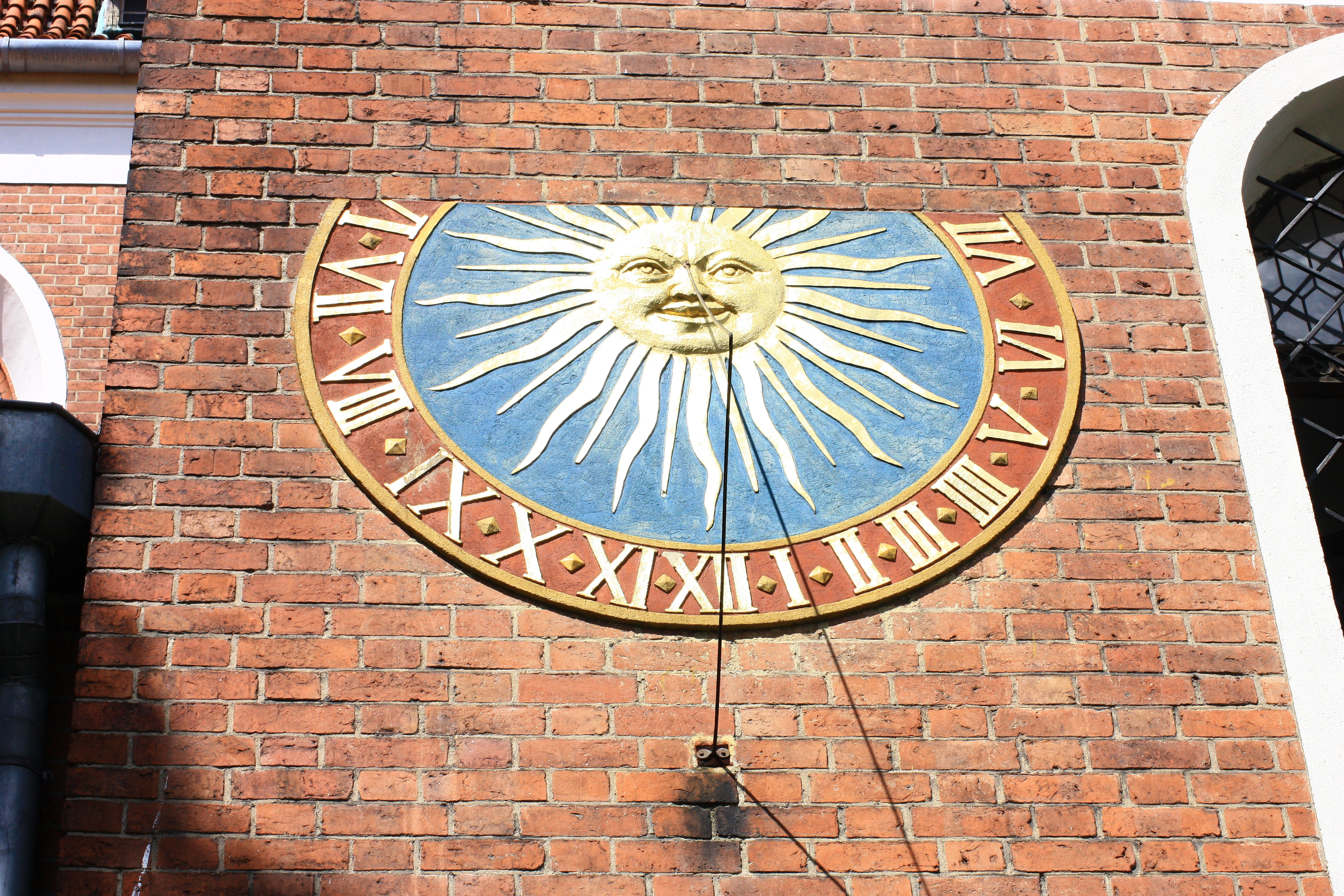
Sundial on the southern façade

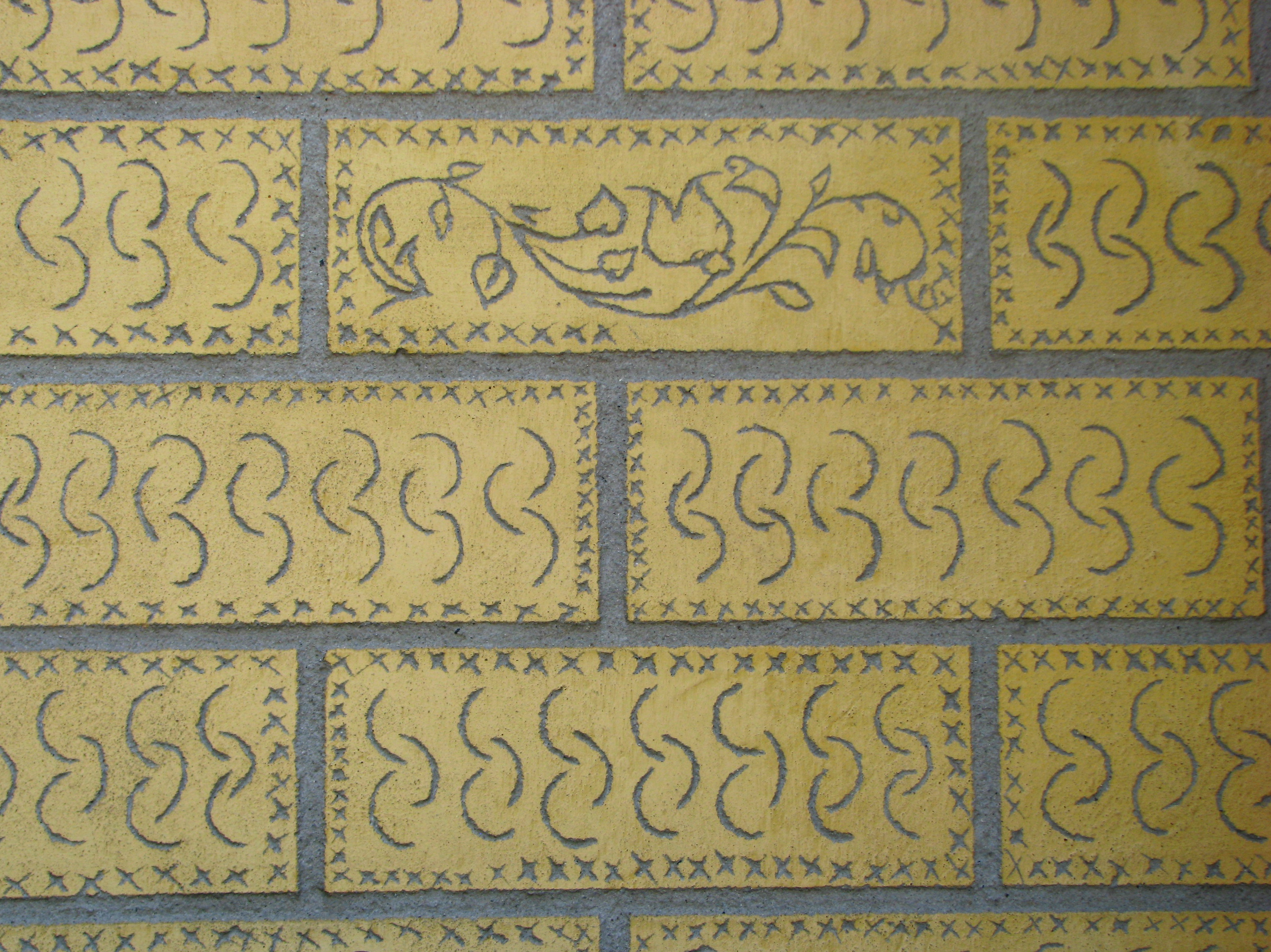
Decorated façade of the western church porch

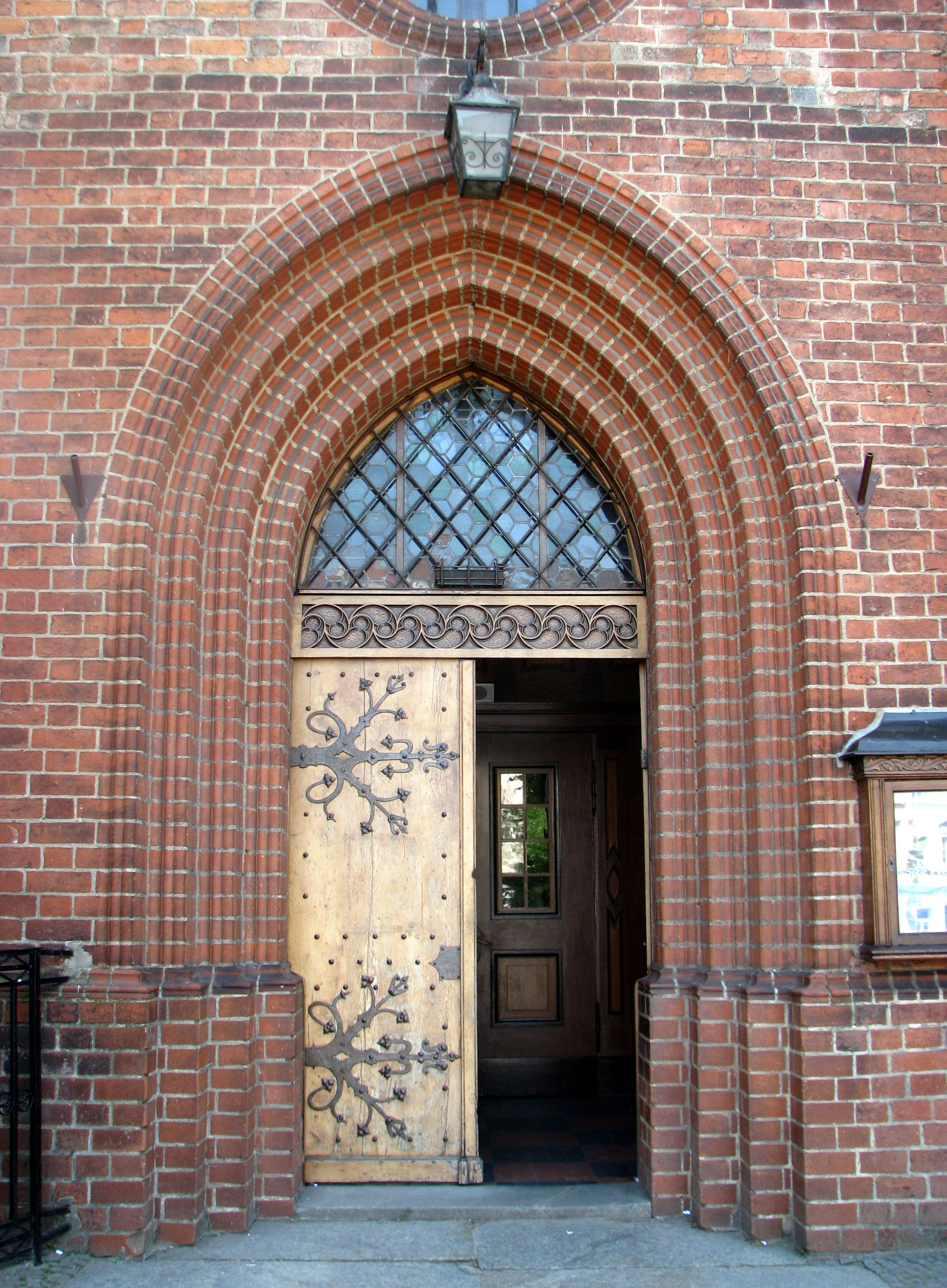
Entrance to the northern church porch

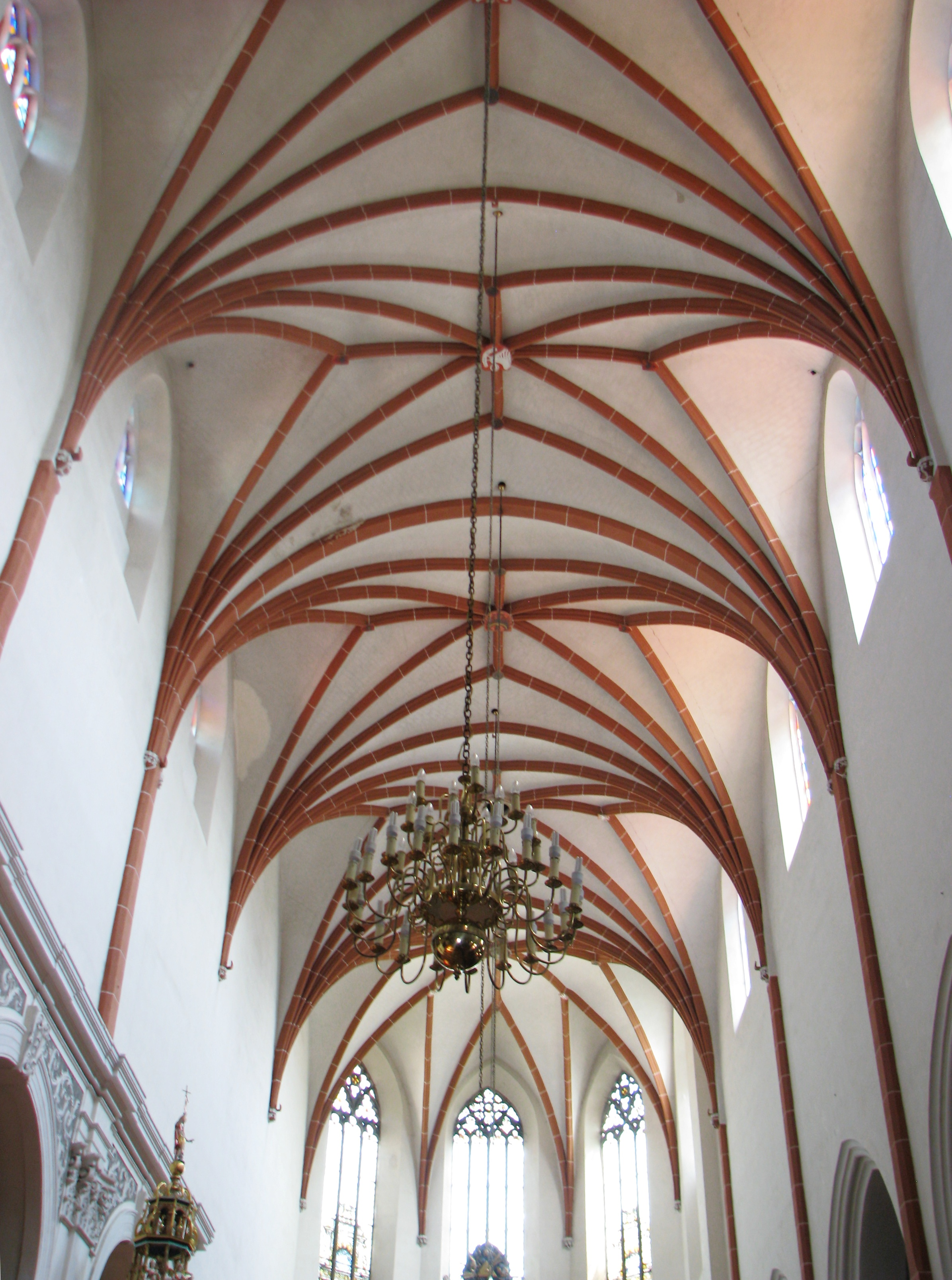
Vaulting of the main nave

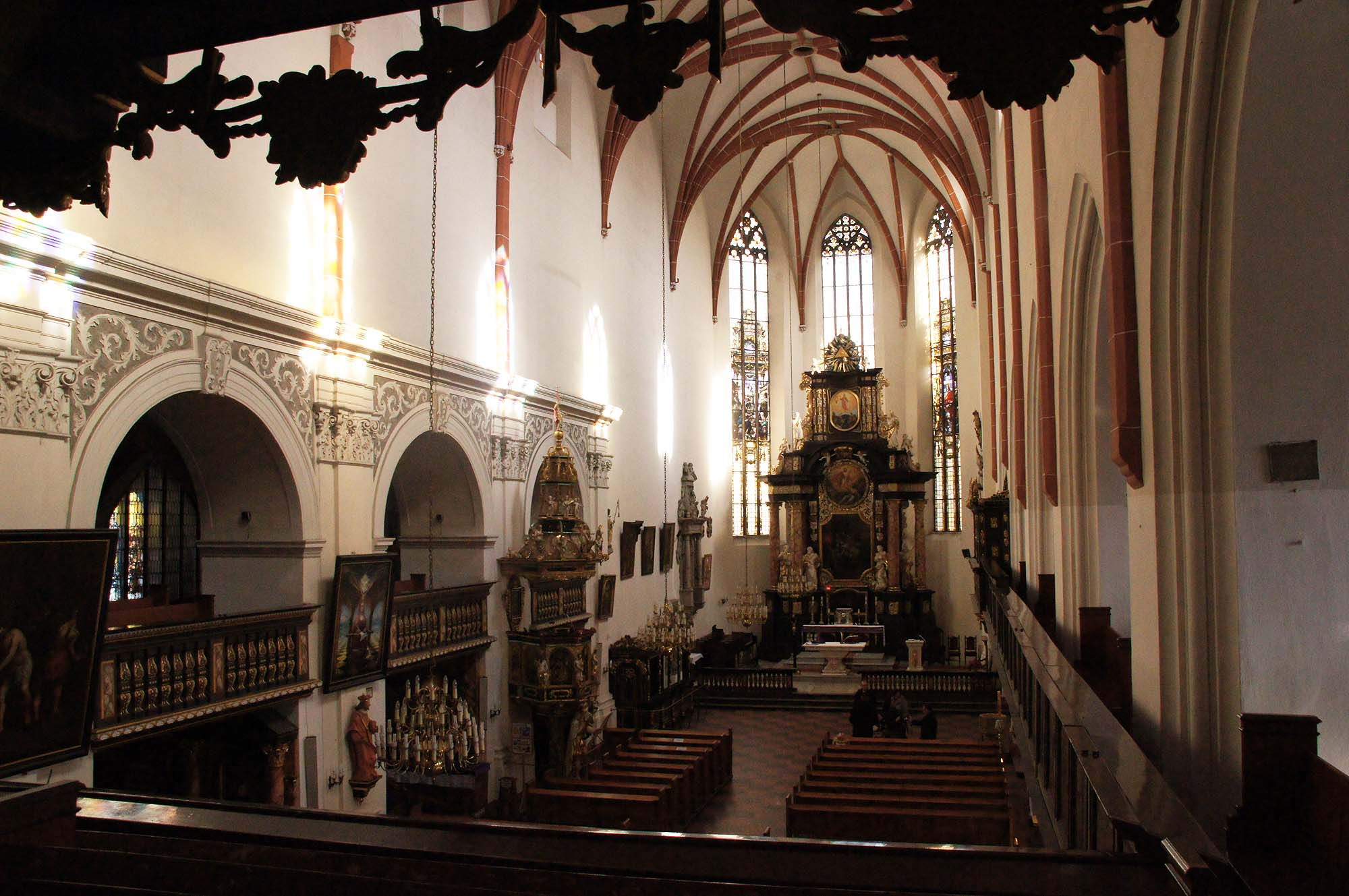
Interior of the basilica

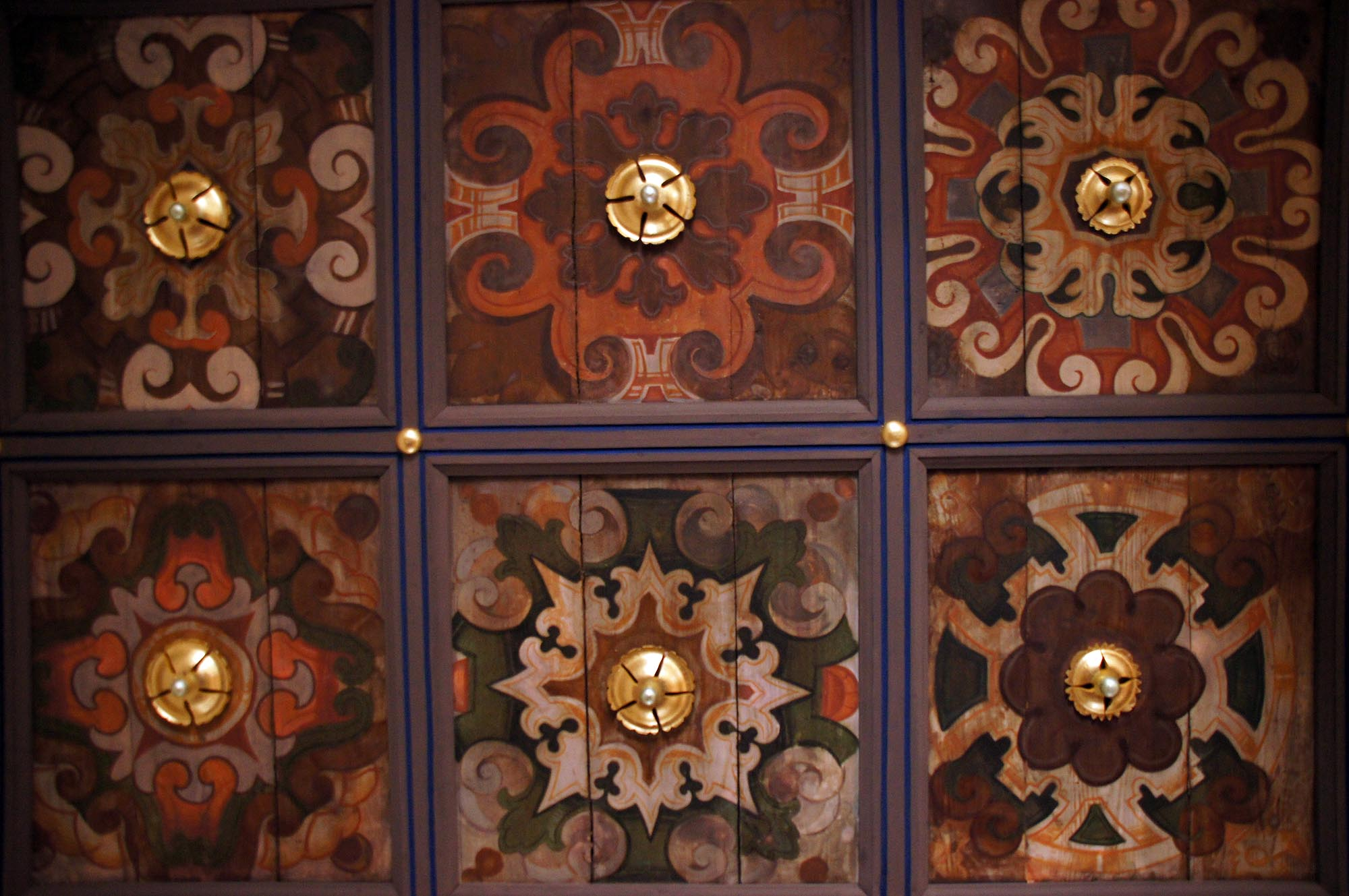
Vaulting above the western matroneum

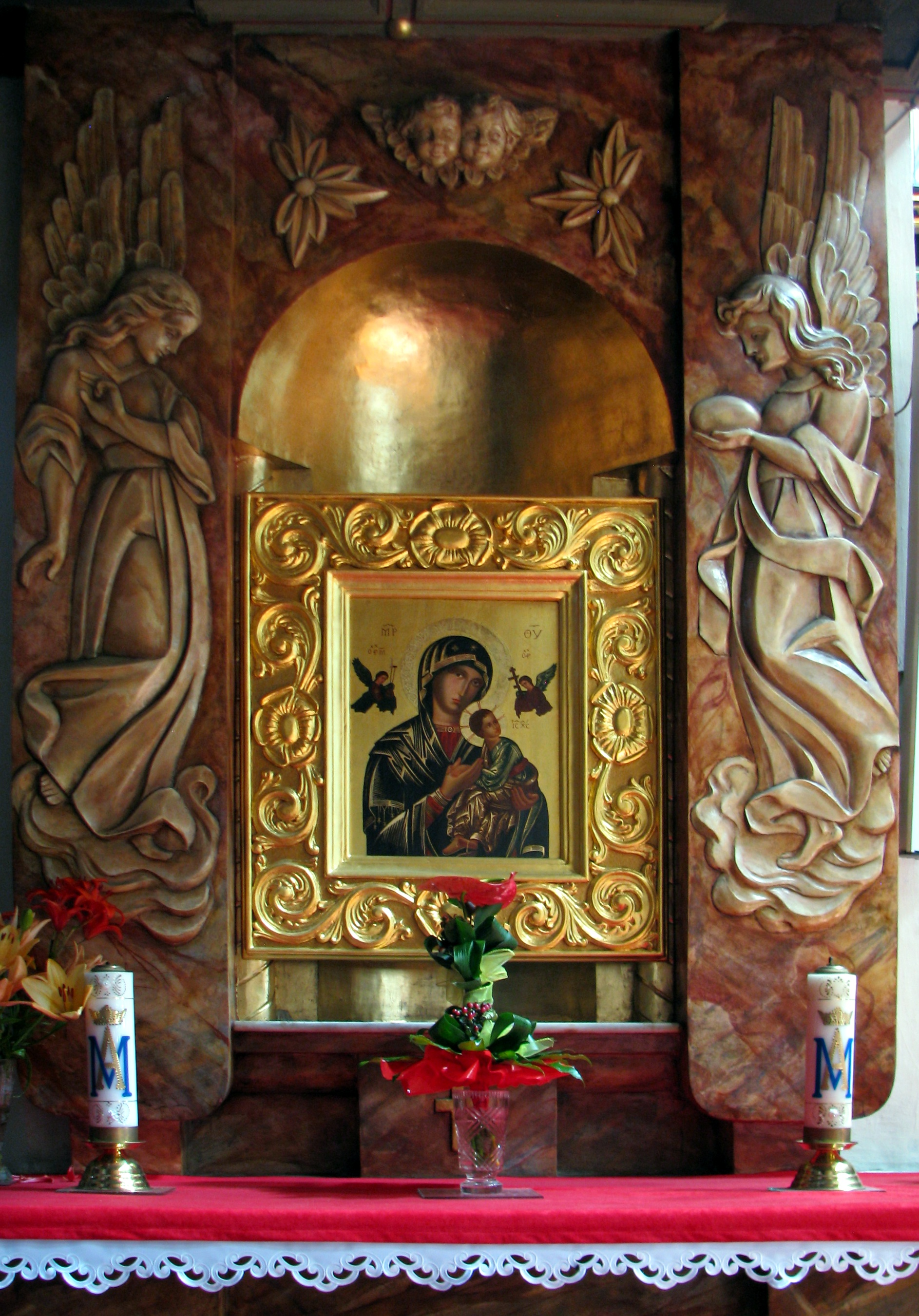
Image of Our Lady of Perpetual Help. Side altar

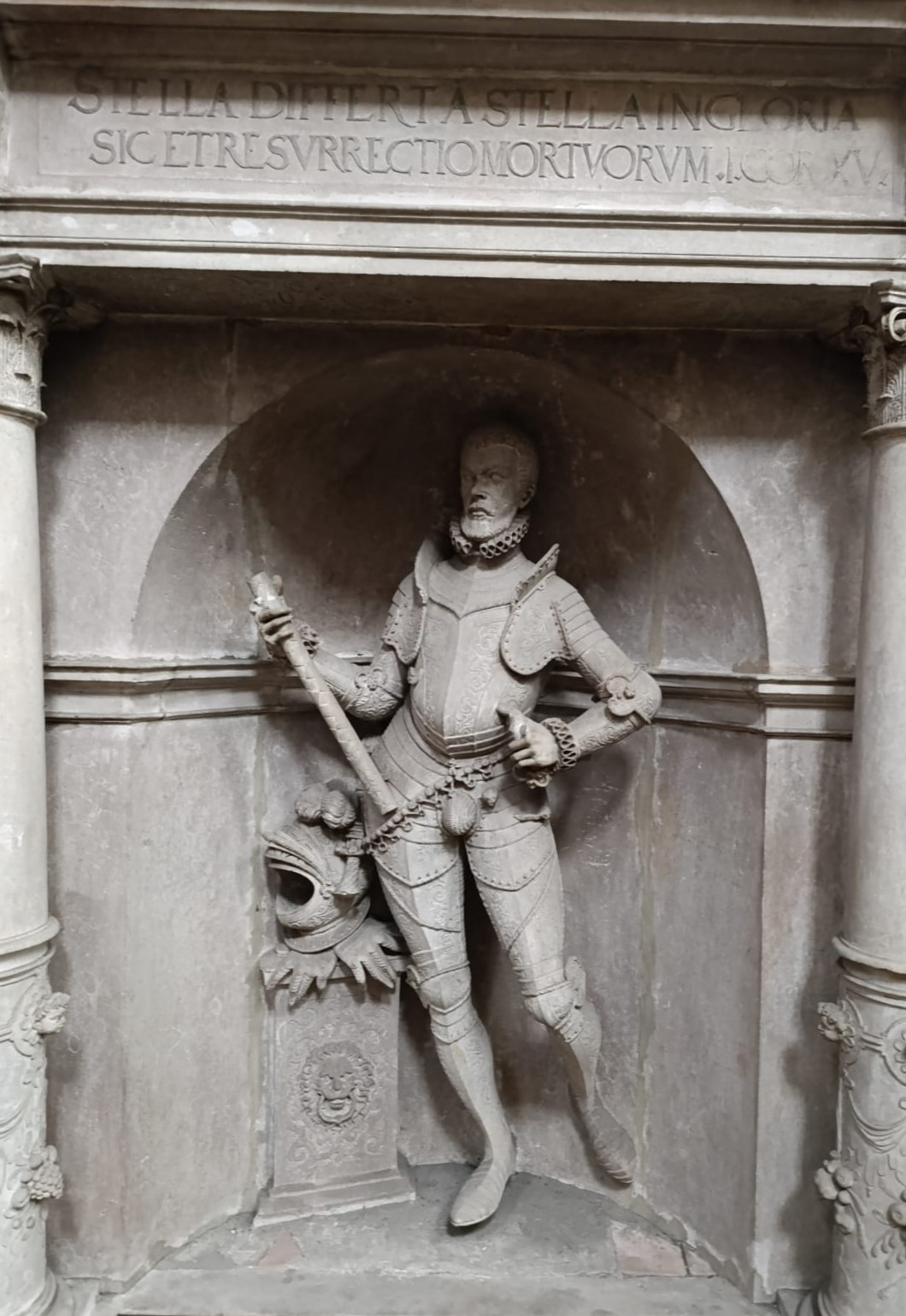
Sculpture of Charles Christopher

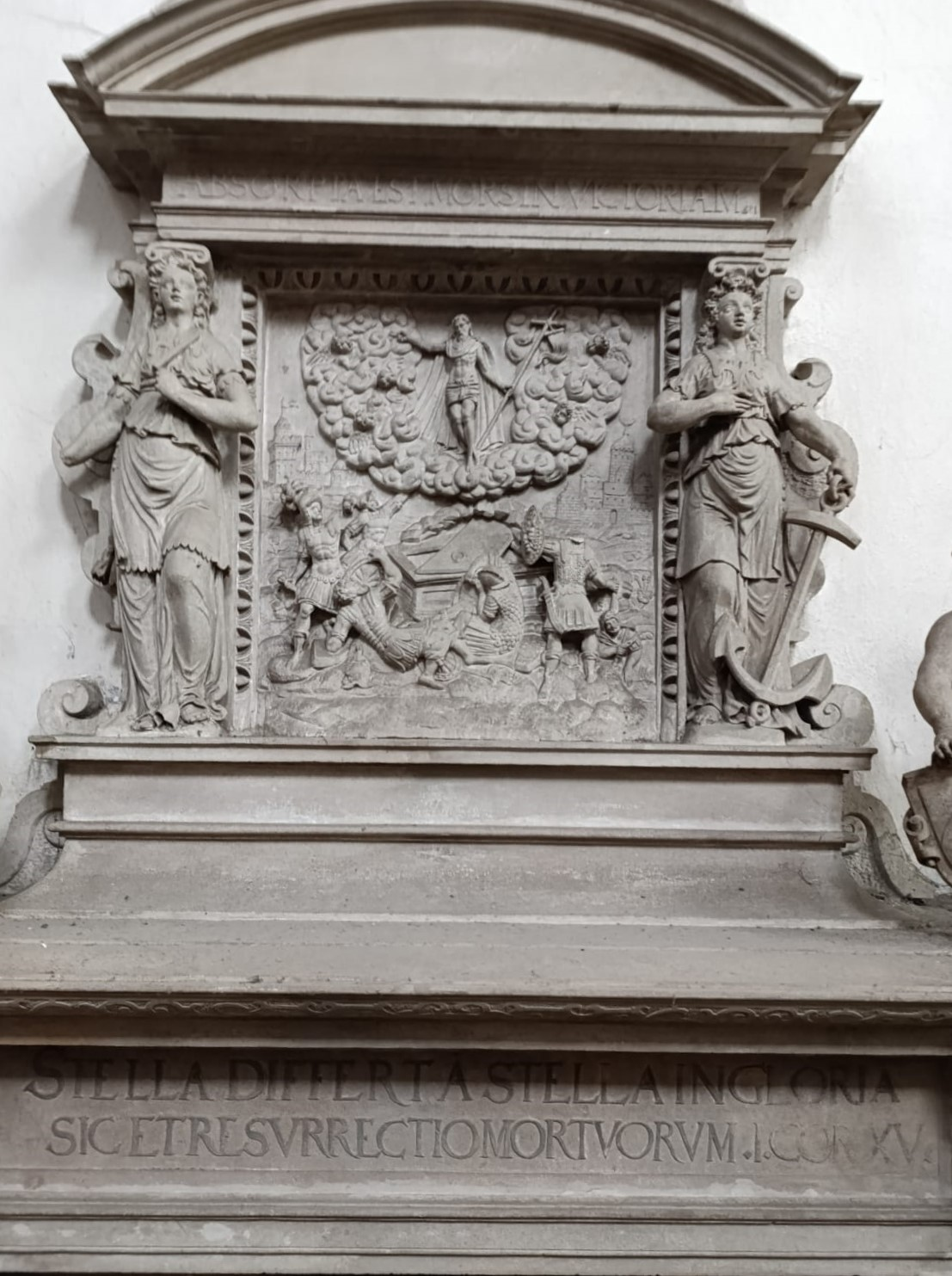
Details on the tomb of Charles Christopher

== Bibliography ==
- Mrozowicz, Wojciech; Wiszewski, Przemysław (2006). Oleśnica od czasów najdawniejszych po współczesność [Oleśnica From Ancient Times to the Present] (in Polish). Wrocław: ATUT. ISBN 978-83-7432-164-8.
