= Karl II of Münsterberg-Oels =

Charles II, Duke of Münsterberg-Oels
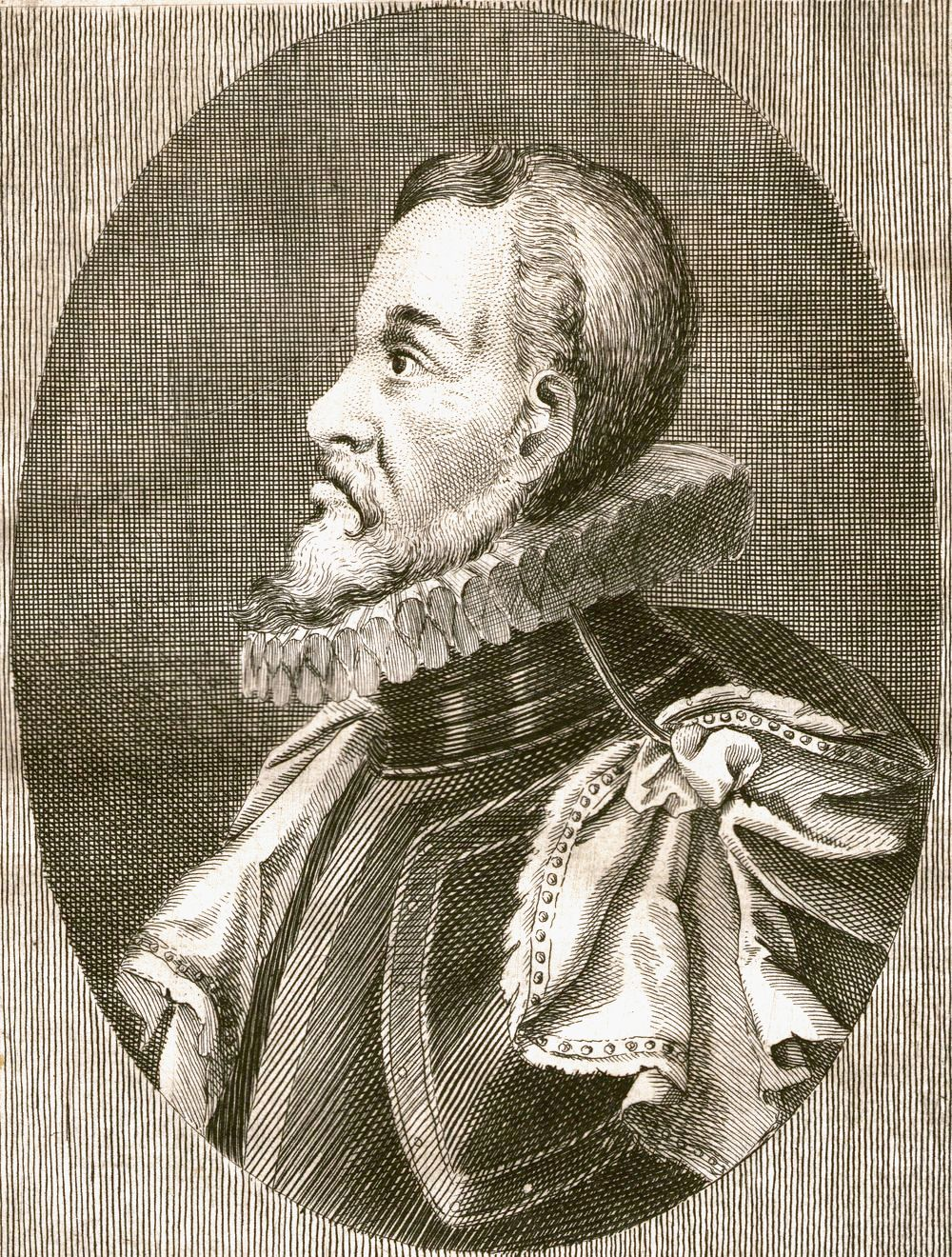
- Charles II of Münsterberg-Oels - engraving by Johann Christoph Sysang (1722)
- Born: 15 April 1545; Oleśnica
- Died: 28 January 1617 (aged 71); Oleśnica
- Noble family: House of Poděbrady
- Spouses: Catherine Berka of Dubá; Elisabeth Magdalena of Brieg
- Issue: Henry Wenceslaus the Elder; Henry Wenceslaus the Younger; Charles Frederick I Elisabeth Magdalena of Legnica; Sophie Catherine of Brieg
- Father: Henry II, Duke of Münsterberg-Oels
- Mother: Margaret of Mecklenburg-Schwerin

Charles II of Münsterberg-Oels (also: Charles II of Poděbrady; Czech: Karel II. z Minsterberka; 15 April 1545 – 28 January 1617) was Duke of Oels from 1565 to 1617 and Duke of Bernstadt from 1604 to 1617. He also held the titles of Duke of Münsterberg (Note: After Charles Christopher of Münsterberg died childless in 1569, the fief of Münsterberg reverted to the Bohemian Crown, but the Lords of Poděbrady kept the right to use the title of Duke of Münsterberg, see Petry and Menzel, vol. 2, p. 67) and Count of Glatz. (Note: The county of Glatz had been sold off in 1501, but the Lords of Poděbrady had kept the right to use the title.) From 1608 to 1617 he was Governor of Silesia under the emperors Rudolf and Matthias.

== Life ==
Charles II was a member of the Münsterberg branch of the House of Poděbrady. His parents were Henry II of Münsterberg and Oels (1507–1548) and Margaret (1515–1559), daughter of Duke Henry V of Mecklenburg-Schwerin.

In 1561, Charles II went to Vienna with his tutor to study. In Vienna, he lived at the court of Emperor Ferdinand I. After Ferdinand's death in 1565, he stayed for another six years at the court of Emperor Maximilian II, whom he accompanied at all diets as well as on journeys to Hungary and further.

After the death of his uncle John of Poděbrady in 1565 Charles inherited the Duchy of Oels. On 17 September 1570 he married Catherine Berka of Dubá (1553–1583) at Moravská Třebová. Through this marriage he acquired to Lordship of Šternberk in North Moravia, which remained in his family until 1647. After Catherine's death in 1583, Charles married Elisabeth Magdalena (1562–1630), daughter of the Duke George II of Brzeg, on 30 September 1585.

After the death of Lord Jiřík Zajímač of Kunštát in 1587, his sister Catherine, who was married to Hynek Brtnický of Waldstein, transferred the Lordship of Jevišovice in South Moravia to Charles II, because the Münsterberg line was the only surviving branch of the Kunštát family. In 1588 Charles swapped with Bishop Stanislaus Pavlovský of Pavlovitz of Olomouc, the Lordship of Žďár nad Sázavou in Moravia for some smaller estates in the vicinity of Šternberk.

Charles was a follower of the evangelical teaching which he promoted in his Moravian lordships. In Trzebnica he was able to establish the evangelical church, even though the abbess of the Sanctuary of St. Jadwiga in Trzebnica fought fiercely against it and was supported by the bishop in Wroclaw as well as by the Emperor. In 1602, he assumed the guardianship of his nephews John Christian of Brieg and George Rudolf of Liegnitz, who were raised at his court in Oels. In 1604 he bought back the Duchy of Bernstadt, which his brother Henry III had sold in 1574.

After the death of Bishop John VI of Sitsch of Breslau in 1608, he was appointed governor of Silesia by Emperor Rudolf II.

== Legacy ==
In his residence of Oels, Charles completed the palace that his uncle John had started. In 1594, he founded the "illustrious high school" as well as a library that served the faculty and students, but was also available to the citizens of Oels. It was housed in a room of the Castle Church and, after the church collapsed in 1905 a new wing attached to the front hall. After the Second World War and the associated transition to Poland, this room was not accessible and the library was initially listed as missing. In 1997, the files could by indexed by the Commission for Personal Libraries of the Academy of Sciences and Literature in Mainz. The damaged book collection was restored with the financial support of the German Federal Ministry of the Interior.

== Issue ==
Charles's first marriage to Catherine produced two children:

1. Henry Wenceslaus the Elder (1575–1591) and
2. Margareta Magdalene (born 13 May 1578, died 14 May 1578)

His second marriage to Elizabeth Magdalene produced:

1. George (born August 31, 1587; † November 14, 1587)
2. Charles (born January 8, 1590 † May 20, 1590)
3. Henry Wenceslaus the Younger (1592–1639). Issue: Anna Elisabeth (1637–1642)
4. Charles Frederick I (1593–1647), the last person in the male line of the House of Poděbrady
5. Barbara Margaret (1595–1652)
6. George Joachim (1597–1598)
7. Elisabeth Magdalena (1599–1631) married to Georg Rudolf of Legnica
8. Sophie Catherine (1601–1659), married to George III of Brieg (d. 1664)

== Sources ==
- Ludwig Petry, Joseph Joachim Menzel (eds): Geschichte Schlesiens, vol. 2, ISBN 3-7995-6342-3, p. 34, 36, 39, 43 and 49
- Hugo Weczerka: Handbuch der historischen Stätten: Schlesien, Stuttgart, 1977, ISBN 3-520-31601-3, p. 368-373 and family trees on p. 602-603.
