= Joachim of Münsterberg-Oels =

Duke of Münsterberg (1503–1562)

Joachim
- Duke of Münsterberg
- Born: 18 January 1503; Oleśnica, Duchy of Oels, Silesia
- Died: 27 December 1562 (aged 59); Wrocław, Silesia
- Noble family: House of Poděbrady
- Father: Charles I, Duke of Münsterberg-Oels
- Mother: Anna of Sagan

Joachim of Münsterberg (Czech: Jáchym z Minstrberka, German: Joachim von Münsterberg or Joachim of Münsterberg-Oels), also: Joachim of Poděbrady (German: Joachim von Podiebrad; Czech: Jáchym z Poděbrad, Polish: Joachim Podiebradowicz) (18 January 1503 – 27 December 1562), a member of the Podiebrad family, was Silesian duke of Münsterberg and Oels from 1536 to 1542. He also held the title of a Count of Kladsko (Kłodzko), though he never actually ruled the county. From 1545 to 1560 he was Prince-Bishop of Brandenburg.

== Life ==
Joachim was a member of the Münsterberg branch of the Bohemian noble Podiebrad dynasty, descendants of King George of Poděbrady (1420–1471), who had acquired Kłodzko Land in 1454 as well as the Silesian duchy of Münsterberg two years later. His son Duke Henry I (1448–1498), Joachim's grandfather, also received the Duchy of Oels from King Vladislaus Jagiellon in 1495.

Joachim's parents were Duke Charles I of Münsterberg-Oels (1476–1536) and his consort Anna of Sagan (d. 1541), a daughter of the Piast duke Jan II the Mad of Żagań. His father initially ruled jointly with his elder brothers George and Albert, who nevertheless died without male heirs in 1502 and 1511. He had great influence at the Prague court of King Vladislaus and his son Louis, and he played a vital role in the election of the Habsburg archduke Ferdinand I as King of Bohemia in 1526. Though still adhering to the Catholic faith, his father had Joachim and his younger brother educated from 1515 to 1517 by the Lutheran reformer Johann Hess, who at the time held a canonicate in Nysa.

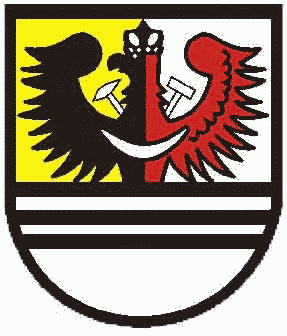
Coat of arms of Srebrna Góra, granted in 1536

After the death of their father in 1536, the brothers Joachim, Henry II, John and George II initially ruled Münsterberg jointly. In a joint deed dated 25 June 1535, they awarded the city of Srebrna Góra (Silberberg) in the Sudetes mountains, which belonged to the Münsterberg duchy, the status of free mining town. Unlike their father, Joachim and his brothers officially implemented the Lutheran faith. In 1537, they expelled the Catholic priests from Münsterberg (Ziębice) and appointed a Lutheran vicar. In the same year, the Hohenzollern elector Joachim II of Brandenburg promised Joachim in Bautzen the bishopric of either Lebus or Brandenburg, when one of these would be available. In return, Joachim and his brothers waived their claims on the Silesian northwestern lands of Krosno which had been incorporated into the Neumark territory of Brandenburg.

In 1542, Joachim and his brothers pledged the heavily indebted Duchy of Münsterberg to their uncle Duke Frederick II of Legnica. John continued to rule the Duchy of Oels and Henry II ruled until 1548 part of the Duchy of Bernstadt.

Against the opposition of the chapter of the cathedral, which revolted against the enforcement of the Reformation, Elector Joachim II, who had converted to the Lutheran faith in 1539, appointed – in accordance with his promise made in 1537 – Joachim of Münsterberg, who now openly turned to Lutheranism, as bishop of the Brandenburg diocese on 6 November 1545. With this appointment, Joachim also received the title of an Imperial prince, and, in this respect, was equal in rank to the Brandenburg elector. In 1560, however, he abdicated the secular rule of the bishopric, in favour of the elector's son, prince John George. After Elector Joachim's death in 1571, the secular rule of the bishopric was incorporated into the electorate.

Joachim died in Wrocław (Breslau), aged 59. The Duchy of Münsterberg reverted as a ceased fief to the Bohemian Crown upon the death of Joachim's nephew Duke Charles Christopher in 1569. The Oels branch of the Podiebrad family ruled their duchy until 1647.

== Footnotes ==
Joachim of Münsterberg-Oels House of Poděbrady Born: 18 January 1503 Died: 27 December 1562
Regnal titles
| Preceded by Charles I of Münsterberg-Oels | Dukes of Münsterberg (Ziębice) joint rule with his brothers George II, Henry II, and John; 1536–1542 | Succeeded by Frederick II, Duke of Legnica |
| Preceded by Charles I of Münsterberg-Oels | Dukes of Oels joint rule with his brothers George II, Henry II, and John; 1536–1542 | Succeeded by John of Oels |
Religious titles
Regnal titles
| Vacant Title last held by Matthias von Jagow | Prince-Bishop of Brandenburg; 1545-1560 | Succeeded by John George, Margrave of Brandenburg |
