= Henry II of Münsterberg-Oels =

- Born: 29 March 1507
- Died: 2 August 1548 (aged 41); Bierutów
- Noble family: House of Poděbrady
- Spouses: Margaret of Pernstein; Margaret of Mecklenburg-Schwerin
- Issue: Salomena; Henry III, Duke of Münsterberg-Oels; Charles II, Duke of Münsterberg-Oels; Catherine
- Father: Charles I, Duke of Münsterberg-Oels
- Mother: Anna of Sagan

Henry II of Münsterberg-Oels (also known as:Henry II of Poděbrady, German: Heinrich II. von Münsterberg-Oels or Heinrich II. von Podiebrad, Czech: Jindřich II. Minstrbersko-Olešnický; 29 March 1507 – 2 August 1548, Bierutów) was from 1536 to 1542 Duke of Münsterberg and of Oels (Oleśnica) and from 1542 to 1548 Duke of Bernstadt (Bierutów). He also held the title of Count of Glatz (Kladsko), though he never actually ruled the County itself.

== Life ==
Henry II was a member of the Münsterberg line of the Bohemian noble Poděbrady family. His parents were Duke Charles I of Münsterberg-Oels and Anna of Sagan (born: 1480 or 1483; died: 1541), daughter of Duke John II "the Mad".

After his father's death in 1536, Henry initially ruled Münsterberg-Oels jointly with his brothers Joachim, John and George II. In a joint deed dated 25 June 1535, they awarded the city of Srebrna Góra (Silberberg), which belonged to Münsterberg, the status of free mining town. Unlike their father, Joachim and his brothers followed the Lutheran doctrine. In 1537, they expelled the Catholic priests from Münsterberg (Ziębice) and appointed an evangelical vicar.

In 1542, Henry and his brothers pledged the heavily indebted Duchy of Münsterberg to their uncle Duke Frederick II of Legnica. John continued to rule the Duchy of Oels and Henry II ruled until 1548 the Duchy of Bernstadt. Joachim, the oldest of the brothers became Bishop of Brandenburg. Henry chose Bierutów as his residence, and promoted Protestantism there. He expanded Bierutów Palace, adding the south wing. After six years in office, he died in 1548.

== Marriage and offspring ==
On 7 February 1529 Henry married to Margaret of Pernstein, a daughter of John III of Pernstein. She died later that year.

In 1537 Henry married his second wife, Margaret of Mecklenburg-Schwerin (1515–1559), a daughter of Duke Henry V of Mecklenburg-Schwerin. With his second wife, Henry had the following children:

1. Anna (1539–1568)
2. Salomena (1540–1567), married to George of Thurn and Valsassina
3. Henry III (1542–1587), married to Magdalena Meseritsch of Lomnitz (Czech: Magdaléna Mezeřícká z Lomnice)
4. Charles (1543-1543)
5. George (1544–1556)
6. Charles II (1545–1617), Duke of Oels since 1565
7. Catherine (1548–1579), married to George Berka of Dubé (Czech: Jiří Berka z Dubé)

Henry II of Münsterberg-Oels House of Poděbrady Born: 29 March 1507 Died: 2 August 1548
Regnal titles
Preceded by Charles I of Münsterberg-Oels	Dukes of Münsterberg (Ziębice) joint rule with his brothers George II, Joachim, and John; 1536-1542	Succeeded by Frederick II of Legnica
Preceded by Charles I of Münsterberg-Oels	Dukes of Oels joint rule with his brothers George II, Joachim, and John; 1536-1542	Succeeded by John of Oels
New title new duchy partitioned from Oels	Duke of Bernstadt; 1542-1548	Succeeded by Henry III of Bernstadt
