= George II of Münsterberg-Oels =

George II, Duke of Münsterberg Oels
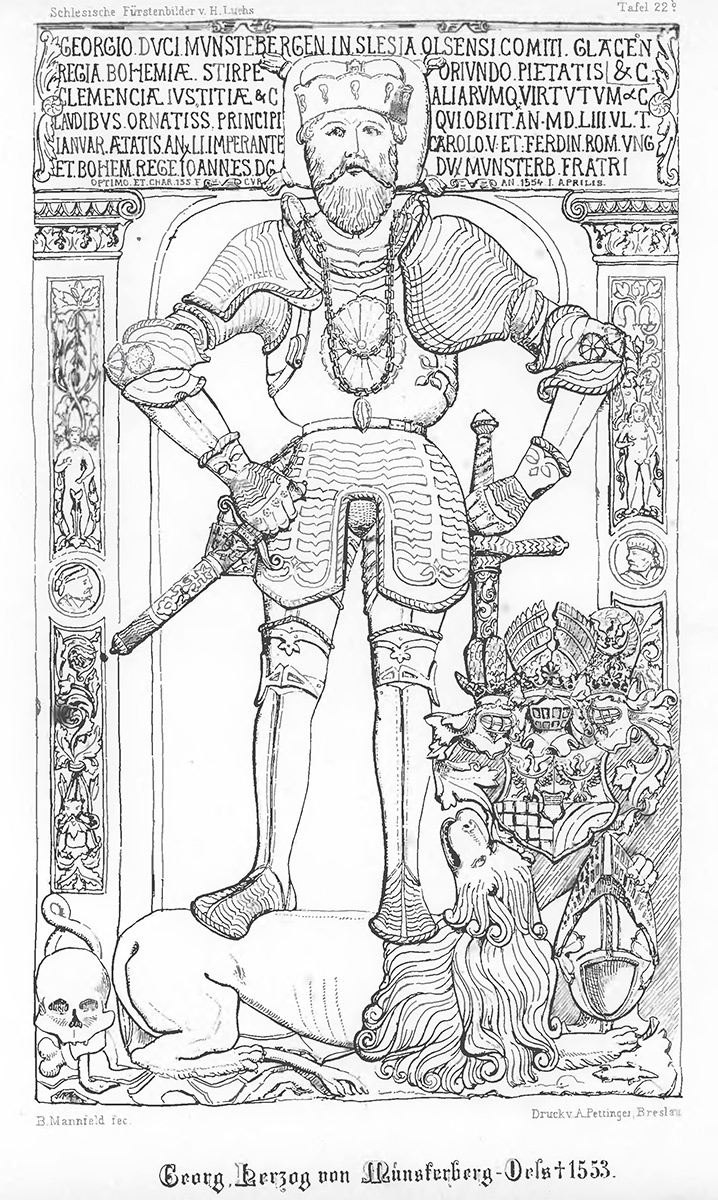
- Drawing of the epitaph for George II
- Born: 30 April 1512; Oleśnica
- Died: 13 January 1553 (aged 40); Oleśnica
- Noble family: House of Poděbrady
- Spouse: Elizabeth Kostka of Postupitz
- Father: Charles I, Duke of Münsterberg-Oels
- Mother: Anna of Sagan

George II of Münsterberg-Oels (also: George II of Poděbrady; German: Georg II. (Münsterberg-Oels), Czech: Jiří II z Minstrberka; 30 April 1512 in Oleśnica – 13 January 1553 in Oleśnica) was a Duke of Münsterberg 1536–1542 and Duke of Oels. He also held the title of a Count of Glatz.

== Life ==
George II was a member of the Münsterberg branch of the Bohemina noble Poděbrady family. He was the twelfth and youngest child of Duke Charles I of Münsterberg-Oels and Anna of Sagan, (1480/83-1541), daughter of Duke John II "the Mad" of Żagań.

George was married with Elizabeth Kostka of Postupitz (Czech: Eliška Kostková z Postupic). After his father's death in 1536, George II initially ruled Münsterberg-Oels jointly with his brothers Joachim, John and Henry II. In a joint deed dated 25 June 1535, they awarded the city of Srebrna Góra, which belonged to Münsterberg (Ziębice, Minstrberk), the status of free mining town. Unlike their father, Joachim and his brothers followed the Lutheran doctrine. In 1537, they expelled the Catholic priests from Münsterberg and appointed an evangelical vicar.

In 1542, Henry and his brothers pledged the heavily indebted Duchy of Münsterberg to their uncle Duke Frederick II of Legnica. John continued to rule the Duchy of Oels and Henry II ruled until 1548 the Duchy of Bernstadt (Polish: Bierutów). Joachim, the oldest of the brothers became Bishop of Brandenburg. George and his brothers continued to use the title of Duke of Münsterberg. George probably lived with his brother John at the castle in Oels (Oleśnica, Olešnice).

He died without an heir at the age of 41 years in Oels. He was buried in the Evangelical castle church (today the Catholic parish church of St. John). In 1554, a Renaissance epitaph, created by the court sculptor Johann Oslew from Würzburg (now Germany), was erected on his grave. It is a sandstone bas-relief, showing George in full armour, standing on a lion.

== References and sources ==
- Hugo Weczerka: Handbuch der historischen Stätten: Schlesien, Stuttgart, 1977, ISBN 3-520-31601-3, pp. 322 and 506 and genealogical tables on pp. 602–603
- Dehio-Handbuch der Kunstdenkmäler in Polen: Schlesien, Munich, Berlin, 2005, ISBN 3-422-03109-X, p. 687.
