= Hedwig of Münsterberg-Oels =

- Born: 10 or 12 June 1508; Oleśnica, Silesia
- Died: November 28, 1531 (aged 23); Legnica
- Noble family: Poděbrady
- Spouse: George, Margrave of Brandenburg-Ansbach (m. 1525)
- Issue: Anna Maria, Duchess of Württemberg; Sabina, Electress of Brandenburg
- Father: Charles I, Duke of Münsterberg-Oels
- Mother: Anna of Sagan

Hedwig of Munsterberg-Oels (Czech: Hedvika Minstrberská; 10/12 June 1508, Oleśnica – 28 November 1531, Legnica) was born Duchess of Münsterberg and Oleśnica and Countess of Kladsko and by marriage Margravine of Brandenburg-Ansbach-Kulmbach.

Hedwig was a daughter of Duke Charles I of Münsterberg-Oels, who was a grandson of the King George of Bohemia. Her mother was Anna of Sagan, a daughter of John II, the last Duke of Żagań (Sagan).

On 9 January 1525 Hedwig married George, Margrave of Brandenburg-Ansbach-Kulmbach. She was George's second wife. The marriage produced two daughters:

- Anna Maria (1526–1589) married in 1544 Duke Christoph of Württemberg (1515–1568)
- Sabina (1529–1575) married in 1548 Elector Johann Georg of Brandenburg (1525–1598)

Hedwig died in Legnica (Liegnitz), where she was buried.
