= Charles I of Münsterberg-Oels =

Bohemian aristocrat (1476–1536)

Charles I, Duke of Münsterberg-Oels
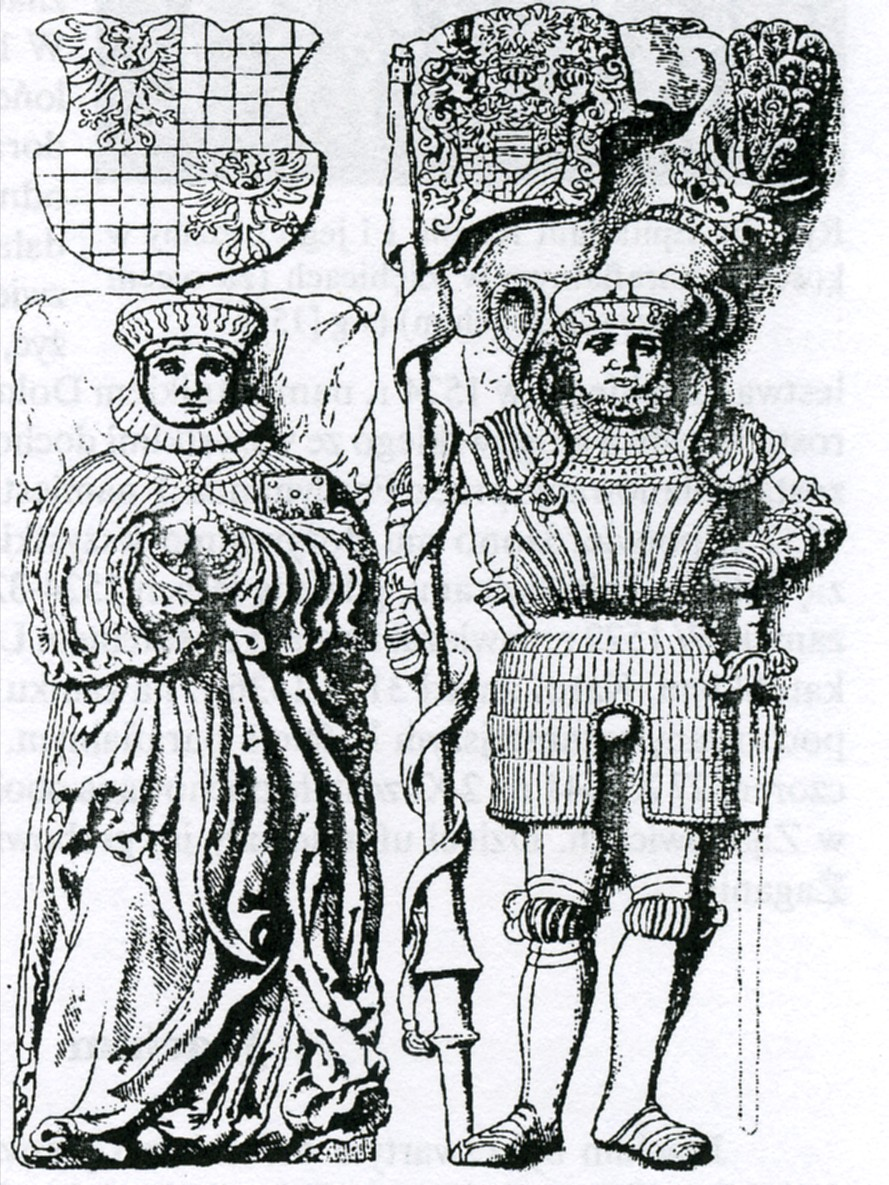
- Drawing of the tomb of Charles I and his wife
- Born: 2 May 1476 or 4 May 1476; Kladsko
- Died: 31 May 1536; Frankenstein
- Noble family: House of Poděbrady
- Spouse: Anna of Sagan
- Issue: Margareta; Joachim, Prince-Bishop of Brandenburg; Kunigunde; Ursula; Henry II, Duke of Münsterberg-Oels; Hedwig, Margravine of Brandenburg-Ansbach; John, Duke of Münsterberg-Oels; Barbara; George II, Duke of Münsterberg-Oels
- Father: Henry the Elder of Munsterberg
- Mother: Ursula of Brandenburg

Charles I, Duke of Münsterberg-Oels (also: Charles I of Podebrady, Czech: Karel z Minstrberka, German: Karl I. von Münsterberg; 2 or 4 May 1476, in Kladsko – 31 May 1536, in Frankenstein) was a member of the House of Poděbrady. He was Duke of Münsterberg and Duke of Oels as well as Count of Kladsko. From 1519 to 1523 he held the office of the bailiff of Upper Lusatia, in 1523 he was made Obersthauptmann of Bohemia and in 1524 Landeshauptmann of Silesia.

== Life ==
Charles was a grandson of King George of Bohemia. His parents were Henry the Elder of Munsterberg and Ursula of Brandenburg, daughter of Margrave Albrecht III Achilles of Brandenburg. In 1488 his father made him marry Anna of Sagan (1480/83–1541), a daughter of Duke Jan II the Mad. Charles's elder brothers Albert I and George were also married to daughters of John II.

After their father's death in 1498, the three brothers Albert, George and Charles ruled jointly at first, but each lived on his own court: Albert in Kłodzko, George in Oleśnica, and Charles in Münsterberg. Charles moved his residence in 1530 in the newly built castle of Frankenstein.

Since Charles intended to transfer his residence to Frankenstein, he promoted the development of the city. In order to favour people settling in the city, he built new stone houses, and there were freihauses for the landed gentry. The city wall was rebuilt and strengthened and in 1511 a stone parsonage was built. Around the same time Charles began construction of a large palace to replace the ruins of the medieval castle of Frankenstein. His successors continued to work on the castle, but it was never finished. By the middle of the 16th Century, the Duchy was so heavily indebted that it had to be pledged at times; the high cost of the palace probably contributed to this problem.

His brothers George and Albert died in 1502 and 1511. So Charles inherited the country and ruled alone as Duke of Münsterberg and Oels. Although Charles and his brothers had sold the county of Kladsko in 1501 to their future brother in law Ulrich of Hardegg, they and their descendants continue to use the title of Counts of Kladsko, until the House of Münsterberg died out in the male line 1647.

Charles served the Bohemian kings Vladislaus II, Louis and Ferdinand I in various high offices. In 1519 King Louis appointed him bailiff of Upper Lusatia. He held this position until the death of the king in 1526. In 1523 he was promoted to chief captain of the Kingdom of Bohemia and was one of the high nobles who administered the country when the king was absent (which he was quite often, as he spent most of his time in Hungary, where he was also King). Furthermore, Charles was made Landeshauptmann of Lower Silesia in 1524.

After the death of King Louis, Charles was a leading figure in organizing the election of the next king. He supported the candidacy of Ferdinand of Habsburg early, and Ferdinand reward him after the coronation in 1527 with the confirmation of his captaincy in Bohemia and awarding him the post of Oberlandeshauptmann in Silesia. The exercise of these offices was incurred a significant financial burden for Charles, so he was forced to sell parts of his territories.

Although Charles read Martin Luther's writings with a benevolent interest, he maintained his Catholic faith during the Reformation.

He died in 1536 and was buried in the St. Anne's Church in Frankenstein, where his sons built a tombstone for him and his wife (she died in 1541).

== Offspring ==
1. Henry (1497–1497)
2. Anna (1499–1504)
3. Catherine (1500–1507)
4. Margareta (Czech: Markéta) (1501–1551), married to Jan Zajíc of Hasenburg
5. Joachim (1503–1562), Bishop of Brandenburg
6. Kunigunde (Czech: Kunhuta) (1504–1532), married to Christopher Černohorský of Boskovice
7. Ursula (Czech: Voršila) (1505–1539), married to Jerome of Bieberstein
8. Henry II (Czech: Jindřich) (1507–1548), Duke of Münsterberg-Oels
9. Hedwig (1508–1531), married in 1525 George of Brandenburg-Ansbach
10. John (Czech: Jan) (1509–1565), Duke of Münsterberg-Oels
11. Barbara (1511–1539), Abbess in Strehlen (Strzelin) near Oels
12. George II (Czech: Jiří) (1512–1553), married to Elizabeth Kostka of Postupice
