= John, Duke of Münsterberg-Oels =

16th Century Duke of Munsterberg-Oels

John of Münsterberg-Oels
- Born: 4 November 1509; Oleśnica
- Died: 28 February 1565 (aged 55); Oleśnica
- Noble family: House of Poděbrady
- Spouses: Christina Catherine of Schidlowitz; Margarete of Brunswick-Wolfenbüttel
- Issue: Karl Christoph, Duke of Münsterberg
- Father: Charles I, Duke of Münsterberg-Oels
- Mother: Anna of Sagan

John of Münsterberg-Oels (also known as John of Poděbrady; German: Johann von Münsterberg-Bernstadt; Czech: Hanuš z Minstrberka; 4 November 1509, Oleśnica – 28 February 1565, Oleśnica) was Duke of the Münsterberg from 1542 to 1565, Duke of Oels from 1548 to 1565 and Duke of Bernstadt from 1548 to 1565. He also held the title of Count of Glatz.

== Life ==
Johann Berger family was a member of the Münsterberg branch of the noble Poděbrady family. His parents were Charles I, Duke of Münsterberg-Oels and Anna of Sagan, daughter of Duke John II "the Mad" of Żagań.

On 20 February 1536 John married Christina Catherine of Schidlowitz (Polish: Krystyna Katarzyna Szydłowiecka; 1519–1556). Later that year his father died. Initially, John ruled Münsterberg-Oels jointly with his brothers Joachim, Henry II and George II. In a joint deed dated 25 June 1535, they awarded the city of Srebrna Góra, which belonged to Münsterberg, the status of free mining town. Unlike their father, Joachim and his brothers followed the Lutheran doctrine. In 1537, they expelled the Catholic priests from Münsterberg and appointed an evangelical vicar.

In 1542, Joachim and his brothers pledged the heavily indebted Duchy of Münsterberg to their uncle Duke Frederick II of Legnica. That same year, the other possessions were divided: Henry II received the Duchy of Bernstadt, Joachim, the oldest of the brothers became Bishop of Brandenburg, while John continued the government in the Duchy of Oels. There he led the rebuilding of the castle into a Renaissance castle and the construction of a four storey Front Castle that would be used as Wittum.

After the Duchy Münsterberg was returned to the Poděbrady family in 1559, it was again ruled by John. After the death of his first wife he married on 8 September 1561 with Margarete, a daughter of Duke Henry II of Brunswick-Wolfenbüttel who survived John by fifteen years. After John's death in 1565, he was succeeded by his only son, Charles Christoph as Duke of Münsterberg. The Duchy of Oels was inherited by John's nephew Charles II, the Duchy of Bernstadt by his brother Henry III, who sold it in 1574.

In 1557, after the death of his first wife, John had a sandstone tomb built for Christina and himself in the church in Oels. It was built by the sculptor Johannes Oslew from Würzburg and is decorated with floral patterns and coats of arms. At the foot of the life-size figures of the Duke and Duchess are two lions.

John's son, Charles Christopher died in 1569 after a brief reign as Duke of Münsterberg at the age of 24 years. He was the last male descendant of the House of Poděbrady. After his death, the Duchy Münsterberg reverted to the Crown of Bohemia.

John, Duke of Münsterberg-Oels House of Poděbrady Born: 4 November 1509 in Oleśnica Died: 28 February 1565 in Oleśnica
Regnal titles
Preceded by Charles I of Münsterberg-Oels	Dukes of Münsterberg (Ziębice) joint rule with his brothers George II, Henry II, and Joachim; 1536-1542	Succeeded by Frederick II of Legnica
Preceded by Charles I of Münsterberg-Oels	Dukes of Oels with his brothers George II, Henry II, and Joachim till 1542; 1536-1565	Succeeded by Charles II of Oels
Preceded by Isabella Jagiellon	Duke of Münsterberg (Ziębice); 1559-1565	Succeeded by Charles Christopher of Münsterberg
