= Bolechovice Castle =

Coordinates: 49°36′41″N 14°30′06″E

Bolechovice Castle (Czech: Bolechovický zámek) is a castle in the Czech Republic, considered a representative example of a rococo Central Bohemian estate set on a medieval foundation.

The castle is set in the middle of a former farmstead. A two-story rococo building, the front wing has a central pediment and the buttresses to the main facade. Above the entrance portal is a cartouche with the coat of arms of Thomas Popovsky Šarfenbach. A rear residential wing was added, probably in the 19th century.

== History ==
The first mention of the Bolechovice chateau is with the passing of the Marquis of Bolechovice in 1381, followed by Vykéř of Bolechovice, 1423 and Henry of Bolechovice in 1448 and 1450 (as an ally of the Poděbrady family).

Early in the 16th century, the castle belonged Jan Žehart of Nasevrk, who sold it in 1539 to Jan Snětsky of Snět. The Snět lordship sold to Bedřichovský of Lomna, and a member of the family Anna Kateřina Měděncová of Vesce in 1622 sold off to Zdenek Lvov Libštejnské of Kolovratt; in 1704 Tomáš Popovský of Šafenbach. The structure was built as a humble abode, not originally as a chateau, but in 1775 it was built as such by Jan Karvínsky of Karvína on the location of the earlier fortification. Owners changed frequently from that time until 1882 when brewer Emanuel Kallberg purchased it and it was passed on to his descendants.

== Recent history ==
There is currently no available documentation as to the estate's provenance during the second world war, or after, when according to the so-called Beneš decrees, property of Nazi sympathizers was confiscated. Similarly, there is no documentation of how the estate was managed under the Czechoslovak Communist regime, when similar properties were confiscated by the government.

The Bolechovice castle was occupied up to and after the Velvet Revolution by the family of the painter Jan Souček, and is currently registered to his wife Emilie Součková along with Milan Kalina, managing editor of Prague's Jewish community journal, Obecní noviny and Bejt Simcha's magazine, Maskilu. Burdened with debt, the castle has recently been seized by its creditors, pending property auction. In recent cultural history, Bolechovice Castle has been host to a variety of cultural events.

== Sources ==
- kol.: Hrady, zámky a tvrze v Čechách, na Moravě a ve Slezsku, díl IV., Svoboda, Praha 1985, 12.3. 2010
