= Anna of Sagan =

Member of the House of Piast

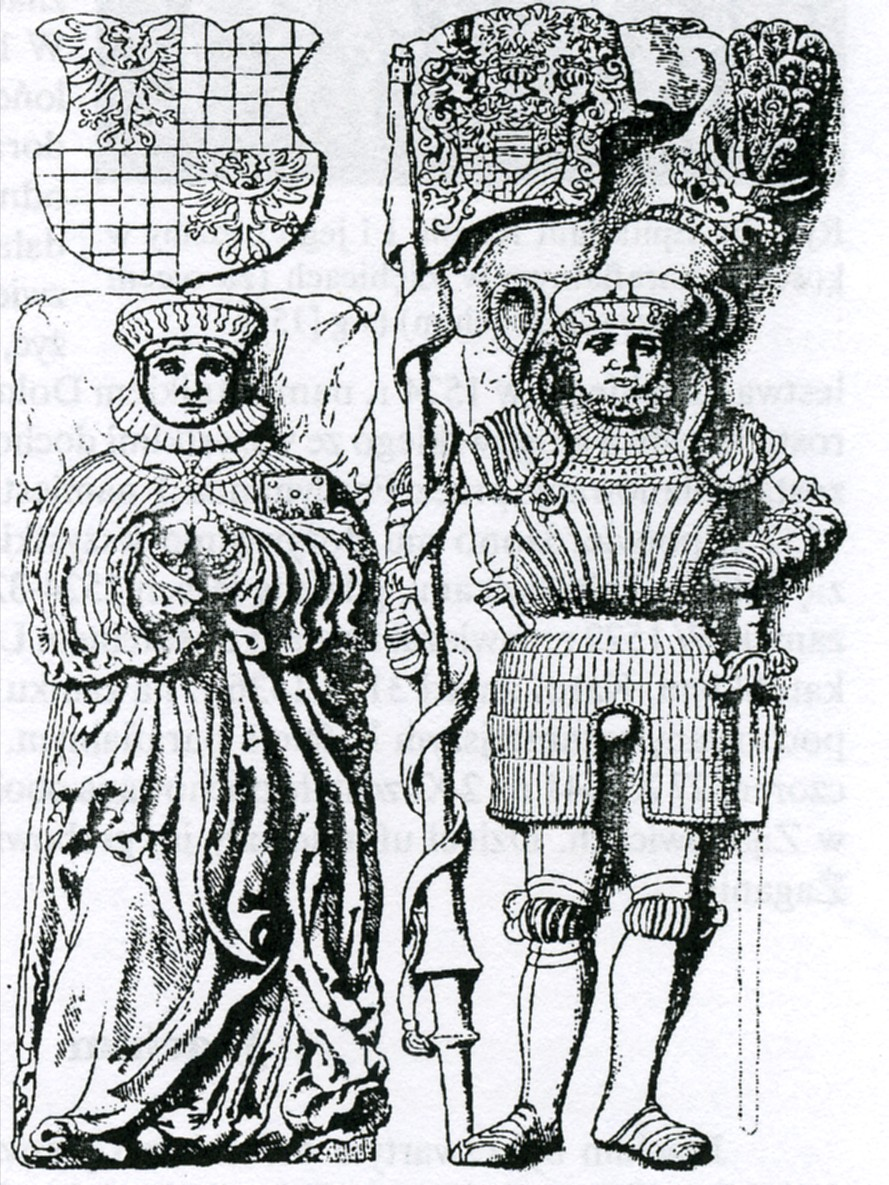
- The tomb of Charles I of Münsterberg-Oels and Anna of Sagan
- Died: 1541
- Noble family: Silesian Piast
- Spouse: Charles I, Duke of Münsterberg-Oels
- Father: Jan II the Mad
- Mother: Catherine of Opava

Anna of Sagan (Polish: Anna żagańska, Czech: Anna Zaháňská, also Hlohovsko-Zaháňská or Zaháňsko-Hlohovská) (born c. 1480, died 27 or 28 October 1541) was the last surviving member of the Głogów-Żagań branch of the Silesian Piasts family, and by marriage duchess of Münsterberg and Oels.

She was the daughter of Prince Jan II the Mad. On 7 January 1488 she married Duke Charles I of Münsterberg-Oels, with whom she had twelve children:

1. Henry (* / † 1497)
2. Anna (1499–1504)
3. Catherine (1500–1507)
4. Margareta (1501–1551), married to Jan Zajíc of Hasenburg
5. Joachim (1503–1562), Bishop of Brandenburg
6. Kunhuta (1504–1532), married to Christopher Cernohorsky of Boskowitz
7. Ursula Vorsila (1505–1539), married to Jerome of Bieberstein
8. Henry II (1507–1548), Duke of Münsterberg-Oels
9. Hedwig (1508–1531), married in 1525 George of Brandenburg-Ansbach
10. John (1509–1565), Duke of Münsterberg-Oels
11. Barbara (1511–1539), Abbess in Strzelin near Oleśnica
12. George II (1512–1553), married to Elizabeth Kostka of Postupitz

She died on 27 or 28 October 1541 and was buried alongside her husband in the parish church of St. Anna in Frankenstein.
