= Henry III of Münsterberg-Oels =

- Born: 29 April 1542; Oleśnica
- Died: 10 April 1587 (aged 44); Oleśnica
- Noble family: House of Poděbrady
- Spouse: Magdalena Meseritsch of Lomnitz
- Father: Henry II, Duke of Münsterberg-Oels
- Mother: Margaret of Mecklenburg-Schwerin

Henry III of Münsterberg-Oels (also: Henry III of Poděbrady, Henry III of Bernstadt; German: Heinrich III. von Podiebrad; Czech: Jindřich III-Minstrbersko Olešnický; 29 April 1542, Oleśnica – 10 April 1587, Oleśnica) was Duke of Münsterberg from 1565 to 1574 and Duke of Bernstadt. He also held the title of Count of Glatz.

== Life ==
Henry's parents were Henry II of Münsterberg and Oels and Margaret (1515–1559), daughter of Henry V of Mecklenburg-Schwerin. Henry III was married to Magdalena Meseritsch of Lomnitz (Czech: Magdaléna Mezeřícká z Lomnice).

When his father died in 1548, Henry was only six years old, so he initially stood under the guardianship of his uncle John, who called himself "Duke of Bernstadt" from 1548 until his death in 1565. In 1565, Henry III took up the rule of the Duchy of Bernstadt. He was excessively in debt, and in 1574, he had to sell the Duchy of Bernstadt, including the castle and several more villages, to the von Schindel family.

Henry III died childless in 1587. The Duchy of Bernstadt was bought back in 1604 by Henry's brother Charles II.

== References ad sources ==
- Hugo Weczerka: Handbuch der historischen Stätten: Schlesien, Stuttgart, 1977, ISBN 3-520-31601-3, p. 19 and genealogical tables on p. 602–603.
- Rudolf Žáček: Dějiny Slezska v datech, Prague, 2004, ISBN 80-7277-172-8, p. 145, 410 and 436.
