= Karl Christoph, Duke of Münsterberg =

16th-century Duke of Münsterberg

Charles Christopher, Duke of Münsterberg
- Born: 22 May 1545; Oleśnica
- Died: 17 March 1569 (aged 23); Oleśnica
- Noble family: House of Poděbrady
- Father: John, Duke of Münsterberg-Oels
- Mother: Christina Catherine of Schidlowitz

Charles Christopher, Duke of Münsterberg (also Charles Christopher of Poděbrady, Czech: Karel Krištof z Poděbrad or Karel Krištof z Minstrberka; 22 May 1545, Oleśnica – 17 March 1569, Oleśnica) was duke of Münsterberg from 1565 until his death. He also held the title of Count of Glatz.

== Life ==
Charles Christopher, Duke of Münsterberg was a member of the Münsterberg branch of the House of Poděbrady. His parents were Duke John of Münsterberg-Oels and Christina Catherine of Schidlowitz (Czech: Kristyna Katarzyna Szydłowiecka; 1519–1556).

In 1558, Charles Christopher undertook a Grand Tour through Europe and then stayed at the court of Emperor Ferdinand I. After the death of his father, who had married his second wife Margaret (d. 1580), a daughter of Duke Henry II of Brunswick-Wolfenbüttel since 1561, Charles Christopher inherited in February 1565 the duchy of Münsterberg. The Duchy of Oels was inherited his cousin Charles II, the Duchy of Bernstadt was inherited by his brother Henry III. Like his father and his brothers Charles Christopher supported the Reformation in his territory. In 1567, Catholic services were suspended in the Peter and Paul cathedral in Münsterberg.

Charles Christopher was not married, and died after a short reign only four years later at the age of 24 years. With his death the rule of the House of Poděbrady in Münsterberg ended. The duchy fell to the Bohemian Crown as a vacant fief. The other lines of the Poděbrady family were allowed to use the title of "Duke of Münsterberg" until the Poděbrady family died out in 1647.

Ten years after Charles Christopher's death his cousin Barbara of Bieberstein donated a marble epitaph to the Castle Church at Oels. It was probably created by Hans Fleiser (also called Gruyter), and shows Duke Charles Christopher clad in armour.
