= Boček I of Poděbrady =

- Born: before 1350
- Died: 1373
- Noble family: House of Poděbrady
- Spouse: Elizabeth of Lichtenburg
- Father: Gerhard of Kunštát

Boček I of Poděbrady (also: Boček I of Kunštát and Poděbrady, German: Botschek I. of Podiebrad, Czech: Boček I. z Kunštátu a Poděbrad; died: 1373) was founder of the Poděbrady line of the House of Kunštát.

== Life ==
It is not known when and where Boček was born. Because his father, Gerhard (or Heralt) was chamberlain (Czech: Komorník) at the courts in Brno and Znojmo, Boček probably grew up in Moravia. Before 1350, Boček went to Bohemia, where he presumably held some office at the court in Prague and acquired the favor of King Charles IV. In any case he was enfeoffed in about 1350 with some smaller escheated manors. In 1351 or earlier, Boček married Elizabeth of Lichtenburg (Czech: Eliska z Lichtemburka), a daughter of Henry of Lichtenburg, at Žleby Castle. By this marriage, he came into the possession of the pledged Lordship of Poděbrady, which he received as a hereditary possession from King Charles IV. In a document dated 1353, he described himself for the first time as Boček of Poděbrady. Later, he called himself Boček of Kunštát and Poděbrady, or Lord of Poděbrady. He founded the Poděbrady branch of the House of Kunštát; Poděbrady Castle was the seat of the family for several generations.

From 1353 to 1358, Boček held the office of cup-bearer (Czech: Číšník) at the court of Charles IV. After he lost the favor of the king, he sought to broaden his family possessions in Bohemia and Moravia. Before 1365 he erected a castle named Obřany Castle in the vicinity of Bystřice pod Hostýnem in the Hostýnské mountains. It was named after the lost family seat of the Kunštát family, Obřany Castle in Brno. As he had built the castle without permission, King Charles IV and his brother, Margrave John Henry, ordered its destruction.

In Moravia, Boček purchased Potštát and in 1365 half of the town of Prostějov. In 1369, he bought the town and castle of Bučovice from Erhard of Bučovice. Before 1371, he also bought the Litice Castle in East Bohemia.

Boček died in 1373.

== Family ==
By his marriage with Elizabeth of Lichtenburg, Boček had three sons:

- Boček II of Kunštát and Poděbrady (died in 1416)
- Henry / Hynek (died after 1376) and
- Ješek (died after 1393)

They also had a daughter:

- Elizabeth (died in 1402), abbess of St. George's Convent, Prague
