= Poděbrady family =

Bohemian noble family

Poděbrady Páni z Poděbrad
- Bohemian noble family
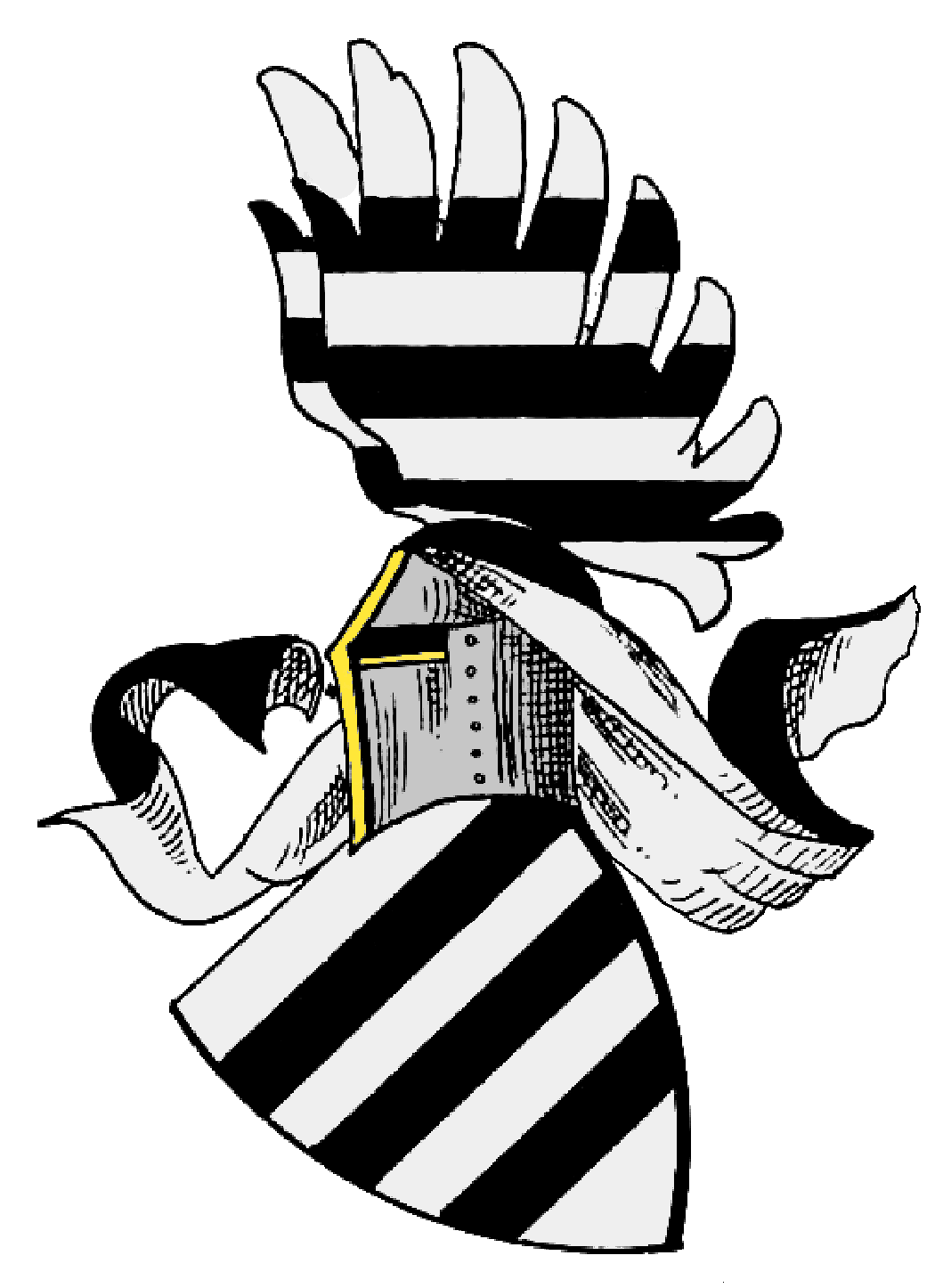
- Coat of arms of the Poděbrady family
- Country: Kingdom of Bohemia
- Founded: 14th century
- Founder: Boček I of Kunštát and Poděbrady
- Titles: Kings of Bohemia; Dukes of Münsterberg; Counts of Glatz

The Bohemian Poděbrady family (Czech: Páni z Poděbrad) was a noble lineage in Bohemia, originating from the Lords of Kunštát. After Boček of Kunštát (d. 1373) obtained the Lordship of Poděbrady through marriage, he styled himself "Boček of Kunštát and Poděbrady." The most prominent member of the family was George of Poděbrady, king of Bohemia. His sons were elevated to imperial counts and Counts of Glatz, and established the Silesian branch of the family, the Dukes of Münsterberg (Knížata z Minsterberka).

== History ==
Among the members of Poděbrady and Münsterberg branches of the family were some of the most important political figures in the Kingdom of Bohemia in the 14th through 17th century. Among their possessions were Poděbrady in central Bohemia and the eastern Bohemian dominions Litice Castle and Hummel and parts of the territory of the former monasteries at Opatovice and Pardubice.

After the death of Hynek Krušina of Lichtenburg, Lord of Glatz in 1454, George of Poděbrady acquired most of the possessions Hynek left behind, under a preliminary contract Hynek had signed shortly before his death. These included the Častolovice inheritance, which included the Lordship of Glatz, which George raised to a county in 1459. In 1456, he bought the Duchy of Münsterberg from Ernest of Opava. This gave him significant influence in Silesia, which would provide the political and economic basis for his descendants. They founded as Dukes of Münsterberg, Oels, Bernstadt and Opava the Silesian branch of the family known in Czech as Paní z Poděbrad a Minsterberka. Even after they lost the Duchy of Münsterberg and sold the County of Glatz in 1501, the Silesian branch of the family continued to call themselves "Duke of Münsterberg" and "Count of Glatz" until the branch died out in 1647.

Duke Charles II, Duke of Münsterberg-Oels, who served as governor of Silesia, acquired the north Moravian Lordship of Šternberk by marriage in 1570. In 1587 he inherited the south Moravian Lordship of Jevišovice.

With the death of Duke Charles Frederick I, the House of Poděbrady died out in the male line in 1647. His possessions reverted to the Bohemian Crown. Because Charles Frederick's daughter Elisabeth Marie of Münsterberg-Oels was married to Silvius I Nimrod, Duke of Württemberg-Oels, the feudal rights on the Principality of Oels were transferred to the House of Württemberg in 1648. The Moravian Lordship of Jevišovice reverted to the sovereign.

== Genealogy of the Poděbrady line ==
- Boček I of Kunštát and Poděbrady (d. 1373), founder of the family branch of the lords of Podebrady Kunstadt.
- Henry (Hynek) of Kunštát and Poděbrady (died after 1376), son of Boček I.
- Ješek of Kunštát and Podebrady (died after 1393), son of Boček I.
- Boček II of Kunštát and Poděbrady (d. 1417) was from 1403 to 1408 Oberstlandschreiber ("chief administrator") of Bohemia. His sons were:
  - John of Kunštát and Poděbrady and (died between 1407 and 1409), acquired Kost Castle, Mydlovar Castle and the Lordship of Kostomlaty through his marriage to Elizabeth of Wartenberg (Eliska z Vartemberka). After his early death, the Poděbrady branch of the family lost John's possessions.
  - Boček III of Kunštát and Poděbrady (d. 1429), followers of the Hussites
  - Hynek Boček of Kunštát and Poděbrady (d. 1426), captain of the East Bohemian Orebites.
  - Victor of Kunštát and Poděbrady (1403–1427), was a supporter of the Hussites and the father of:
    - George of Poděbrady was King of Bohemia. He increased his property with the Lordship of Glatz, which he raised to a county in 1459, as well as the Silesian Duchy of Münsterberg. After George's death in 1471 his possessions were divided by his four sons in 1472. Three of them founded the Silesian branch of the family as Dukes of Münsterberg. They and their male offspring also held the title of Count of Glatz, even though they sold the county itself in 1501.

== Genealogy of the Silesian line of the Dukes of Münsterberg (offspring of George of Poděbrady) ==
1. Boček IV of Poděbrady (1442–1496) eldest son of George of Poděbrady, the last member of family to use the title of Duke of Poděbrady
2. Victor of Münsterberg and Opava (d. 1500), since 1459 imperial count and Duke of Münsterberg and Count of Glatz, 1465-1485 Duke of Opava
  1. Joan (d. 1496), married to Duke Casimir II of Cieszyn
  2. Bartholomew (d. 1515), Duke of Münsterberg and Count of Glatz
  3. Lawrence / Vavřinec (1479–1503)
  4. Euphemia Magdalena (d. 1497), abbess of the Sanctuary of St. Jadwiga in Trzebnica
  5. Ursula / Uršula (died 1534 in Königsberg)
  6. Apolonia († 1529 in Königsberg), married to Erhard of Queis, Bishop of Pomesania
3. Barbara († after 1469), married firstly with Henry of Leipa, and secondly with John Křinecký of Ronov
4. Henry the Elder (d. 1498), since 1462 imperial count, Duke of Münsterberg and Count of Glatz
  1. Albert I, Duke of Münsterberg-Oels (1468–1511), Duke of Münsterberg and Oels, Count of Glatz
    1. Ursula / Uršula (1497–1545), married to Henry / Jindřich Švihovský of Riesenberg
  2. George I, Duke of Münsterberg-Oels (1470–1502), Duke of Münsterberg and Oels, Count of Glatz
    1. Henry / Jindřich (1490)
  3. Margaret of Münsterberg (1473–1530)
  4. Charles I, Duke of Münsterberg-Oels (1476–1536), Duke of Münsterberg and Oels, Count of Glatz
    1. Anna (born: 1499 in Glatz – died: 1504 in Wołów)
    2. Catherine (born: 1500 in Glatz – died: 1507 in Strzelin)
    3. Margaret (born: 1501 in Oleśnica – died: 1551 in Budyně Castle), married to John Zajíc of Hasenburg
    4. Joachim of Münsterberg-Oels (d. 1562), Duke of Münsterberg and Oels, Bishop of Brandenburg
    5. Kunigunde / Kunhuta (1504–1532), married to Christopher of Boskovice
    6. Ursula / Vorsila (1505–1539), married to Jerome of Bieberstein
    7. Henry II, Duke of Münsterberg-Oels (1507–1548), Duke of Munsterberg, Oels, and BernStadt, Count of Glatz
      1. Anna (1539–1568)
      2. Salomena (1540–1567), married to George of Thurn and Valsassina
      3. Henry III of Bernstadt (1542–1587), Duke of Münsterberg and Bernstadt, Count of Glatz
      4. Charles (1543)
      5. Charles II, Duke of Münsterberg-Oels (1545–1617), Duke of Münsterberg and Oels, Count of Glatz, gained the North Moravian Lordship of Šternberk through marriage in 1570; in 1587 he inherited the South Moravian Lordship of Jevišovice
        1. Henry Wenceslaus the Elder, (born: 1575 in Šternberk – died: 1591 in Rome)
        2. Margareta Magdalene (born: 1578 in Šternberk – died: 1578 in Šternberk)
        3. George (born: 1587 in Oleśnica – died: 1587 in Oleśnica)
        4. Charles (born: 1590 in Oleśnica – died: 1590 in Oleśnica)
        5. Henry Wenceslaus the Younger (1592–1639)
          1. Anna Elisabeth (born: 1637 in Bierutów – died: 1642 in Breslau)
        6. Charles Frederick I (1593–1647); the male line of the house in Podebrady Oels ended with him.
          1. Elisabeth Marie of Münsterberg-Oels (born: 1625 in Oleśnica – died: 1686 in Oleśnica), last Duchess of Münsterberg.
        7. Barbara Margaret (born: 1595 in Oleśnica – died: 1652 in Oleśnica)
        8. Joachim George (born: 1597 in Oleśnica – died: 1598 in Oleśnica)
        9. Magdalena Elisabeth (1599–1631) married to George Rudolf of Liegnitz
        10. Sophie Catherine (born: 1601 in Oleśnica – died: 1659 in Brzeg), married to George III of Brzeg (d. 1664)
      6. Catherine (born: 1548 in Bernstadt – died: 1579 in Oleśnica), married to Jiří Berka of Dubá
    8. Hedwig (born: 1508 in Oleśnica – died: 1531 in Legnica), married in 1525 George of Brandenburg-Ansbach -Kulmbach
    9. John, Duke of Münsterberg-Oels (1509–1565), Duke of Münsterberg and Oels, Count of Glatz
      1. Charles Christopher, Duke of Münsterberg (d. 1569), Duke of Münsterberg and Oels, Count of Glatz
    10. George II, Duke of Münsterberg-Oels (1512–1553), Duke of Münsterberg and Oels, Count of Glatz
  5. Magdalena (born: 1482 Glatz – died: 1513 in Oleśnica)
  6. Sidonie/ Zdena (born: 1483 in Glatz – died: 1522 ibid), married in 1515 with Ulrich of Hardegg
5. Catherine of Poděbrady (1449–1464), married to King Matthias Corvinus of Hungary
6. Sidonie / Zdena (born: 1449 in Poděbrady – died: 1510 in Tharandt), married to the Duke Albert III "the Courageous" of Saxony
7. Henry the Younger (died: 1492), since 1462 imperial count, also Duke of Münsterberg and Count of Glatz
  1. Anna (born: 1470 in Litice Castle – died: 1517 in Jindřichův Hradec), married to Henry IV of Neuhaus
  2. Frederick / Bedrich (died after 1492), illegitimate son
8. Frederick / Bedrich (born: 1453 or 1454 – died: 1459)
9. George / Jiří (born: 1454 or 1455 – died: 1459 or 1462)
10. Ludmila of Poděbrady (born: 1456 – died: 1503 in Legnica), married to Frederick I of Legnica
11. John (born: after 1456 – died: 1459)

== References and sources ==
- Ondřej Felcman, Radek Fukala u. a.: Poděbradové. Rod českomoravských pánů, kladských hrabat a sleszkých knížat. Nakladatelství Lidové Noviny 2008, ISBN 978-80-7106-949-2
- Lydia Baštecká, Ivana Ebelová, 'Náchod', Náchod 2004, ISBN 80-7106-674-5, p. 43-58
