= Budyně =

- Municipality
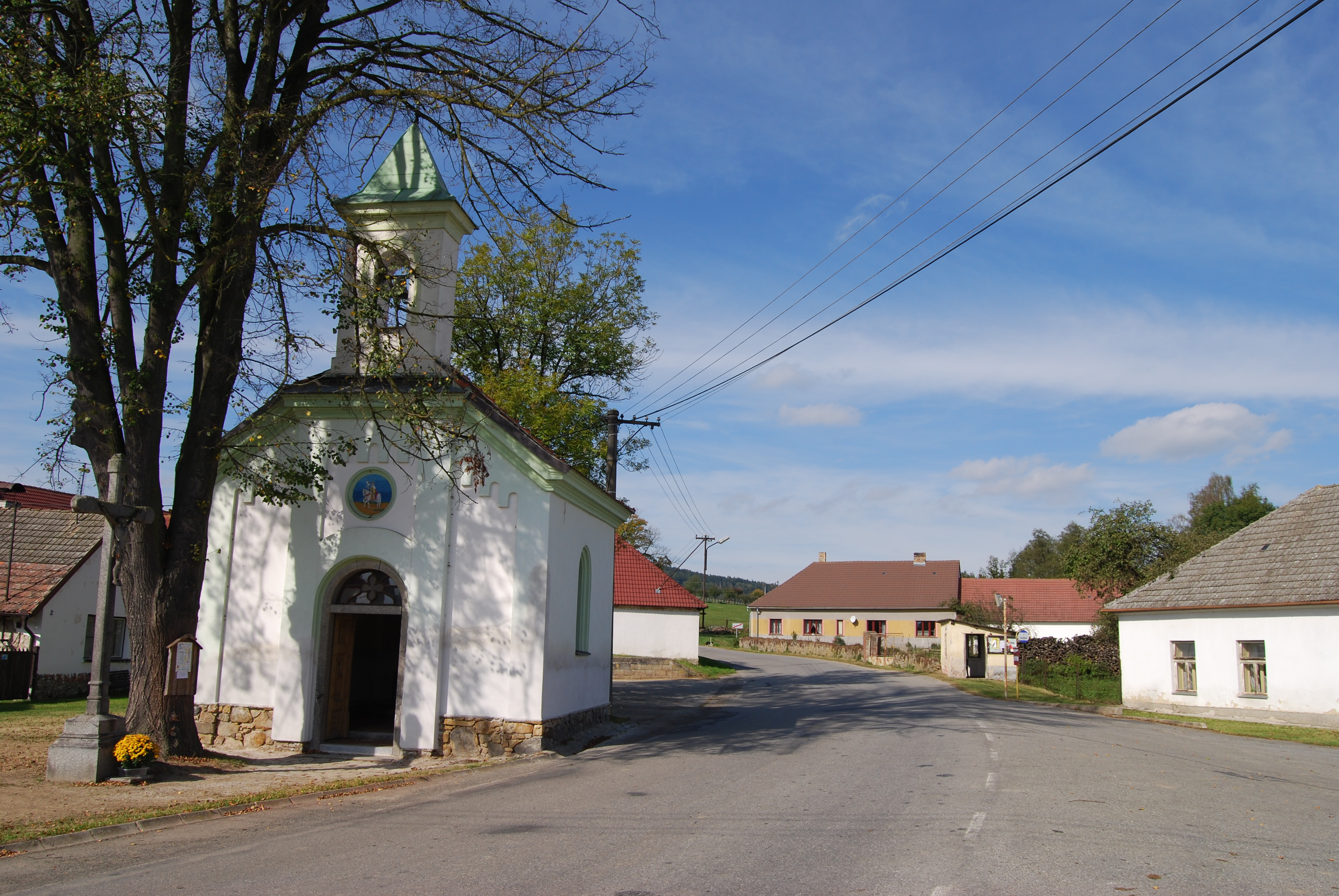
- Chapel of Saint Wenceslaus

- Location in the Czech Republic
- Coordinates: 49°8′47″N 14°4′16″E
- Country: Czech Republic
- Region: South Bohemian
- District: Strakonice
- First mentioned: 1334

Area
  - Total: 2.13 km^{2} (0.82 sq mi)
- Elevation: 431 m (1,414 ft)

Population (2026-01-01)
  - Total: 53
  - Density: 25/km^{2} (64/sq mi)
- Time zone: UTC+1 (CET)
  - Summer (DST): UTC+2 (CEST)
- Postal code: 387 73
- Website: obec-budyne.estranky.cz

Budyně is a municipality and village in Strakonice District in the South Bohemian Region of the Czech Republic. It has about 50 inhabitants.

Budyně lies approximately 18 kilometres (11 mi) south-east of Strakonice, 36 km (22 mi) north-west of České Budějovice, and 108 km (67 mi) south of Prague.

== Demographics ==
Historical population
Year	Pop.	±%
1869	138	—
1880	158	+14.5%
1890	172	+8.9%
1900	158	−8.1%
1910	137	−13.3%
1921	150	+9.5%
1930	135	−10.0%
1950	71	−47.4%
1961	72	+1.4%
1970	54	−25.0%
1980	43	−20.4%
1991	43	+0.0%
2001	37	−14.0%
2011	47	+27.0%
2021	49	+4.3%
Source: Censuses
