= Srebrna Góra, Lower Silesian Voivodeship =

Srebrna Góra
- Village
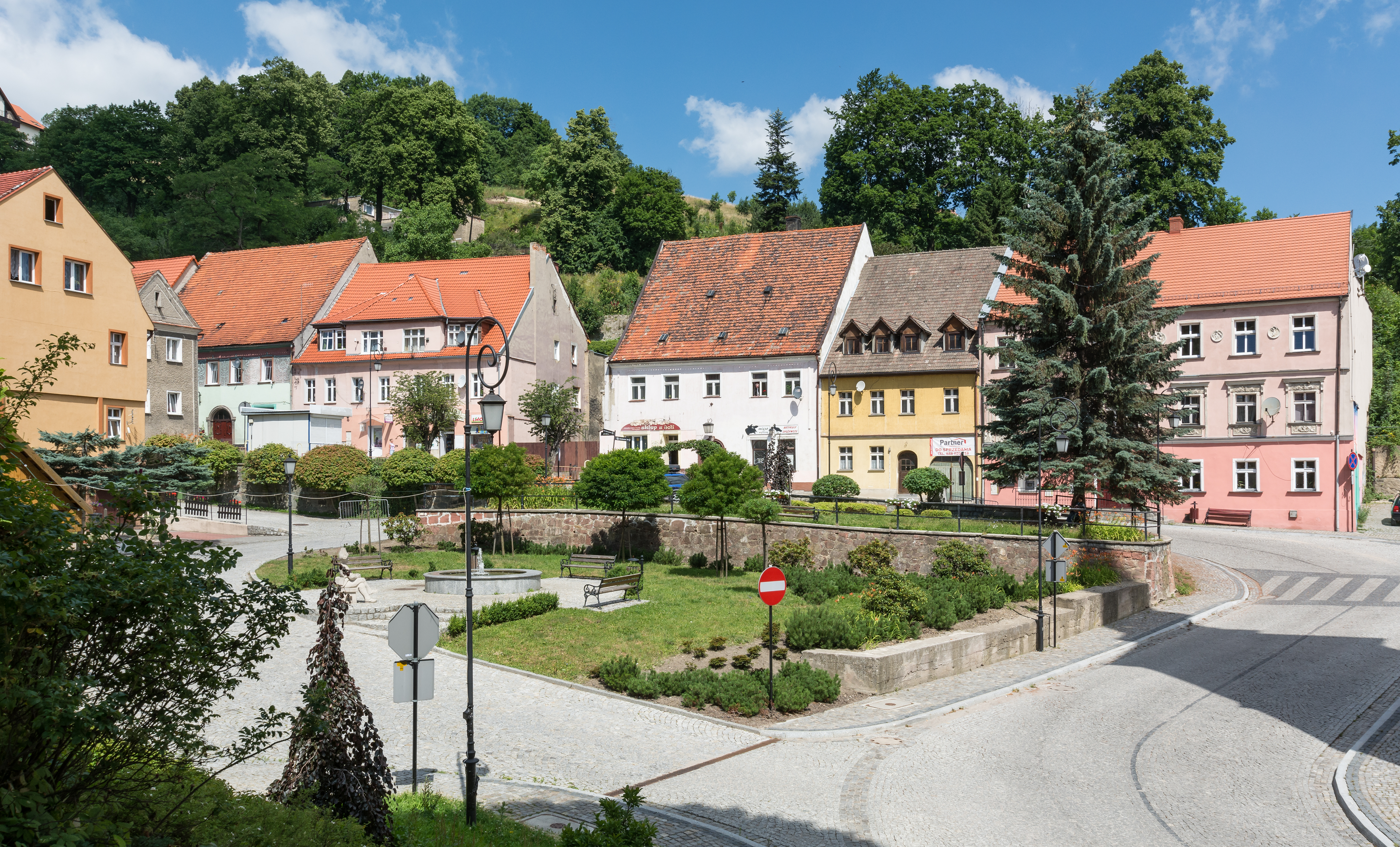
- Letnia Street in Srebrna Góra

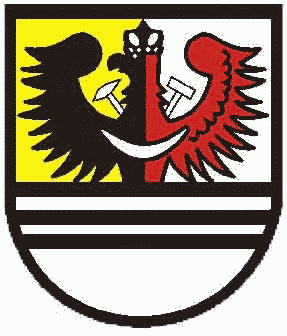
- Coat of arms

- Location within Poland
- Coordinates: 50°34′34″N 16°39′45″E
- Country: Poland
- Voivodeship: Lower Silesian
- County: Ząbkowice
- Gmina: Stoszowice
- Population (approx.): 1,500
- Time zone: UTC+1 (CET)
  - Summer (DST): UTC+2 (CEST)
- Vehicle registration: DZA

Srebrna Góra [ˈsrɛbrna ˈɡura] (lit. 'Silver Mountain') is a village (former town) in the administrative district of Gmina Stoszowice, within Ząbkowice County, Lower Silesian Voivodeship, in south-western Poland.

== History ==
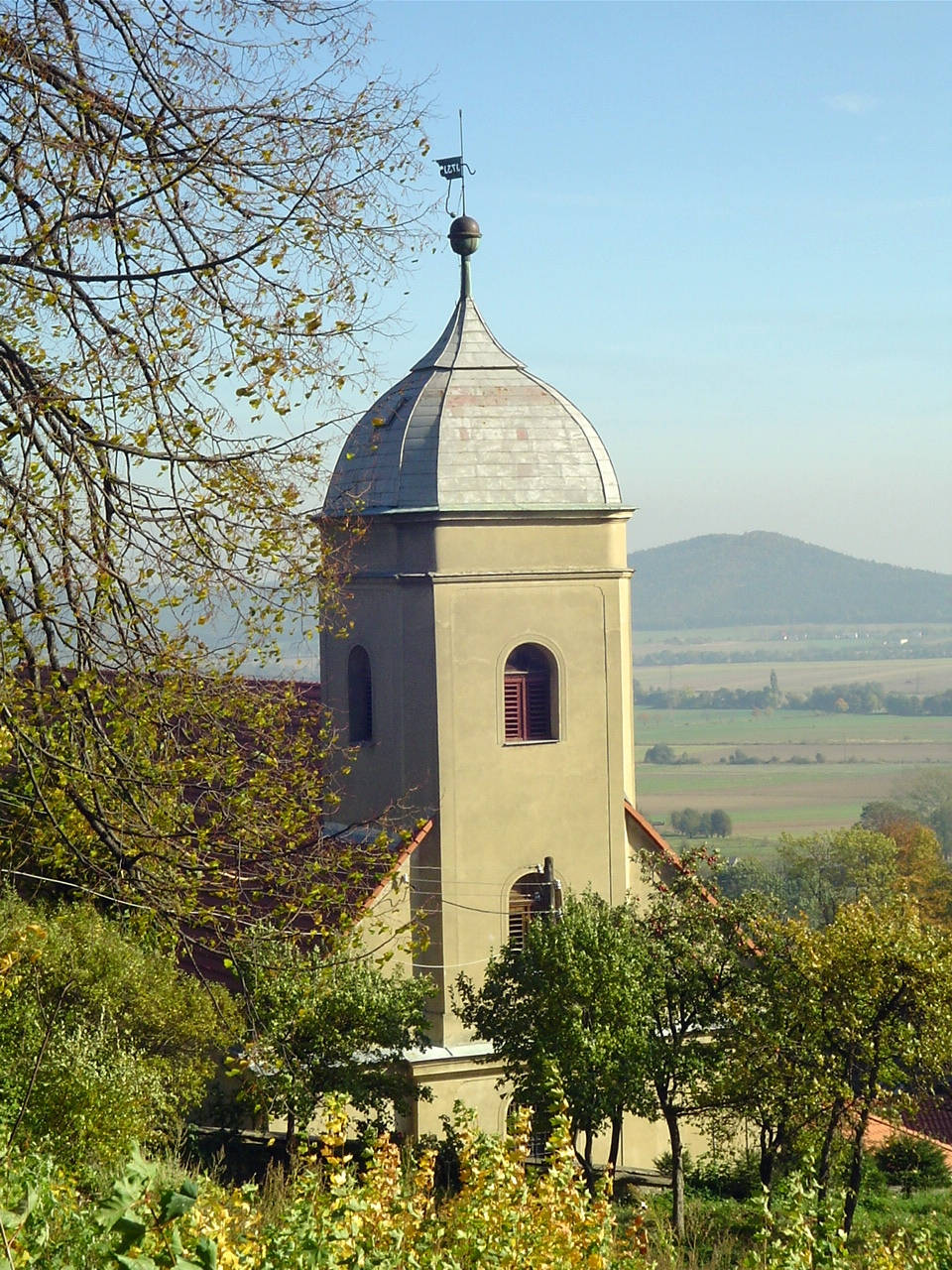
Baroque Saints Peter and Paul church

The settlement dates back to the early 14th century. The silver mining area was mentioned in a 1331 deed issued by the duke Bolko II of Ziębice in 1331, one of the Silesian Polish dukes in Lower Silesia, a Bohemian vassal from 1336. The settlement itself was mentioned in 1417. It was located within the Duchy of Ziębice (Münsterberg), one of the southernmost Lower Silesian duchies created as a result of the fragmentation of medieval Piast-ruled Poland, near the border with the Bohemian County of Kladsko on the mountain pass road to Nowa Ruda, and was often hit by military confrontations, at first by the Hussite Wars, later also by the Thirty Years' War, which left the area devastated. It remained ruled by local Polish dukes of the Piast dynasty until 1428, when the duchy passed to Czech dukes. In the 1470s and 1480s the duchy was under Hungarian suzerainty, before it fell back under Bohemian overlordship in 1490.

In 1536 Silberberg received city rights and mining privileges, and after the Duchy of Ziębice as a reverted fief had fallen to the Bohemian Crown, the area was purchased by Bohemian (Czech) aristocrat William of Rosenberg in 1581. (William bought the town for reasons of prestige, because of the right to mint its own coins which has been tied with the town and local silver mines.) It was again ruled by the Piasts from 1599 as part of the Duchy of Legnica, when it passed to Duke Joachim Frederick of Brieg and it finally fell back to Bohemia upon the death of the last Piast duke George William of Legnica in 1675. With most of Silesia, it was annexed by King Frederick II of Prussia after the First Silesian War in 1742.

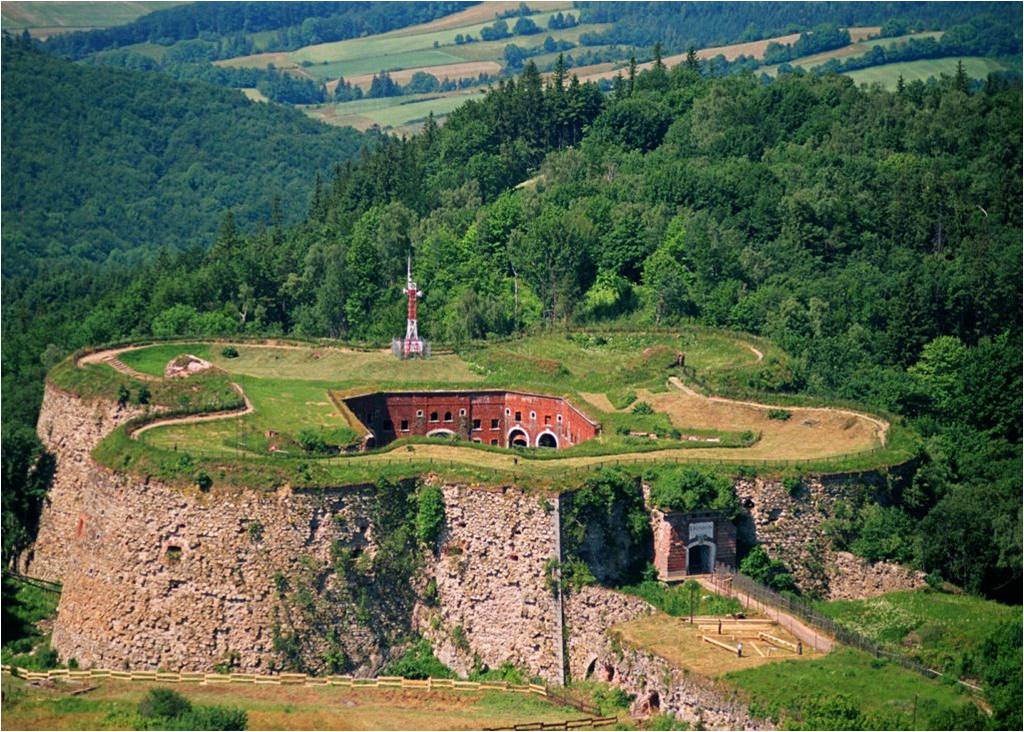
Aerial view of Fort Srebrna Góra

Frederick II had a border fortress of the Prussian Army built at Silberberg, finished in 1778, which after the Napoleonic Wars served as a prison in the pre-revolutionary Vormärz era. Among the inmates was the author Fritz Reuter, arrested here from 1834 until 1837, as well as the editor Wilhelm Wolff. From 1871 the settlement was part of Germany, and during World War II, in December 1939, the Germans established the Oflag VIII-B high-security prisoner-of-war camp in the fortress. In total around 300 POWs were held in the camp from January 1940 to mid-1941, and almost all were Polish officers, plus one French lieutenant. There were poor sanitary conditions, the officers were malnourished, did not have the proper medical care, and three officers died. The Poles tried to escape several times, and in the best-known attempt 10 Poles escaped from the camp in May 1940. Seven escapees were soon captured by the Germans, while three made their way through German-occupied Czechia, Slovakia, Hungary, Yugoslavia, Greece and Turkey to Mandatory Palestine, where they joined the Polish Independent Carpathian Rifle Brigade. After Germany's defeat in World War II in 1945, the settlement became again part of Poland.

The fort is one of Poland's official national Historic Monuments (Pomnik historii), as designated May 1, 2004. Its listing is maintained by the National Heritage Board of Poland.

== See also ==
- Eulengebirgsbahn
