= Duchy of Münsterberg =

Silesian duchy (1321–1791)

Coordinates: 50°36′00″N 17°02′00″E

Duchy of Münsterberg Księstwo ziębickie (pl) Herzogtum Münsterberg (de) Minstrberské knížectví (cs)
- 1321–1791
- Coat of arms

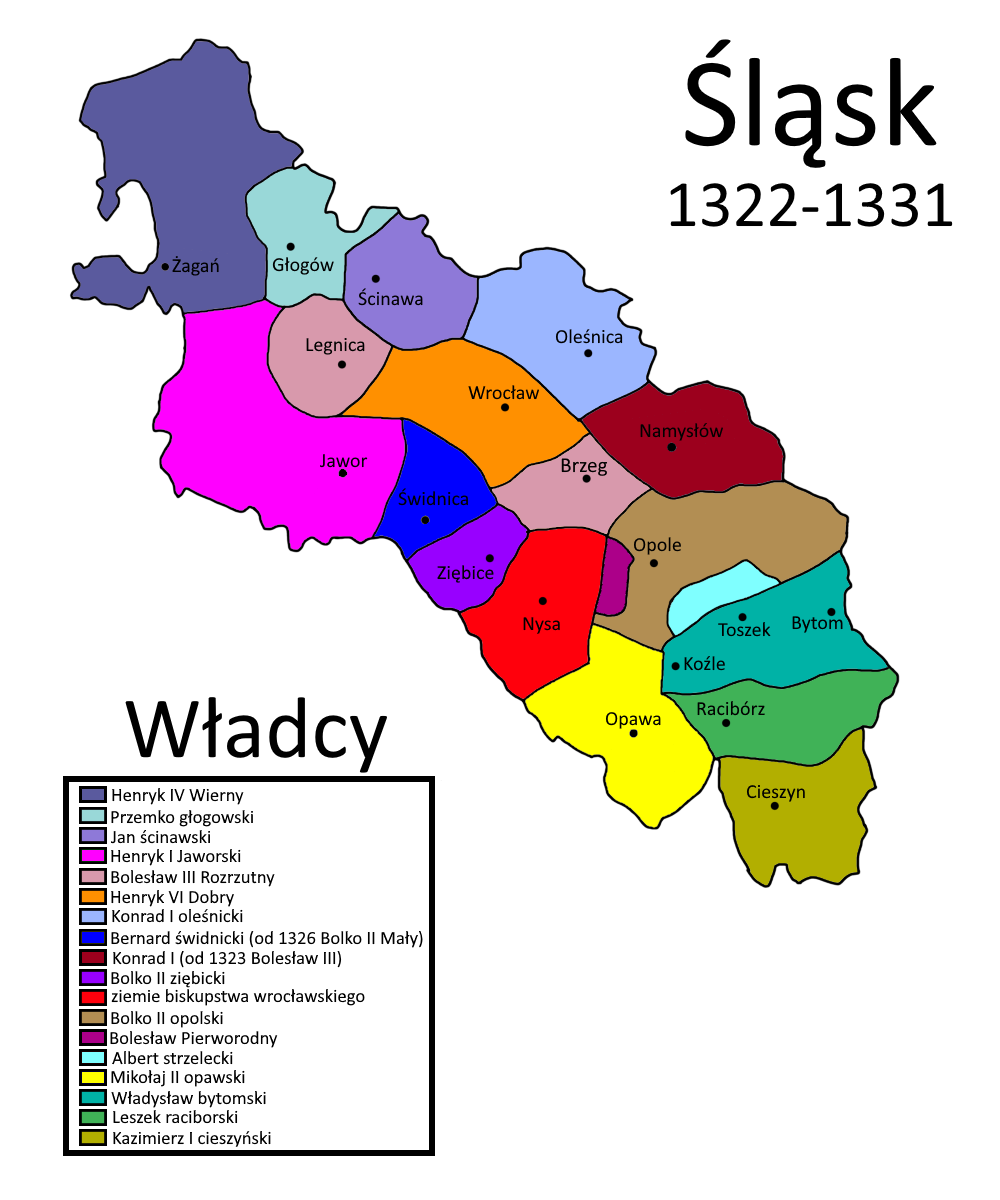
- Silesia in the years 1322–1331 Duchy of Münsterberg (Ziębice)
- Status: Silesian duchy Fiefdom of the Bohemian Crown (1336–1742); Part of Prussia (1742–1791)
- Capital: Ziębice
- Historical era: Middle Ages; Early modern period
  - Partitioned from Jawor-Świdnica: 1321
  - Vassalized by Bohemia: 1336
  - Enfeoffed to Podiebrad family: 1456
  - To Principality of Auersperg: 1654
  - Incorporated into Prussia: 1742
  - Seized by Hohenzollern: 1791
| Preceded by | Succeeded by |
| Duchy of Jawor / Duchy of Jawor | Kingdom of Prussia |
- Today part of: Poland

The Duchy of Münsterberg (German: Herzogtum Münsterberg) or Duchy of Ziębice (Polish: Księstwo Ziębickie, Czech: Minstrberské knížectví) was one of the Duchies of Silesia, with a capital in Münsterberg (Ziębice). Existing from 1321/1322 to 1742, it was located in what came to be referred to as Lower Silesia. Its territory is similar to modern Ząbkowice County in Poland.

== Piast rule ==
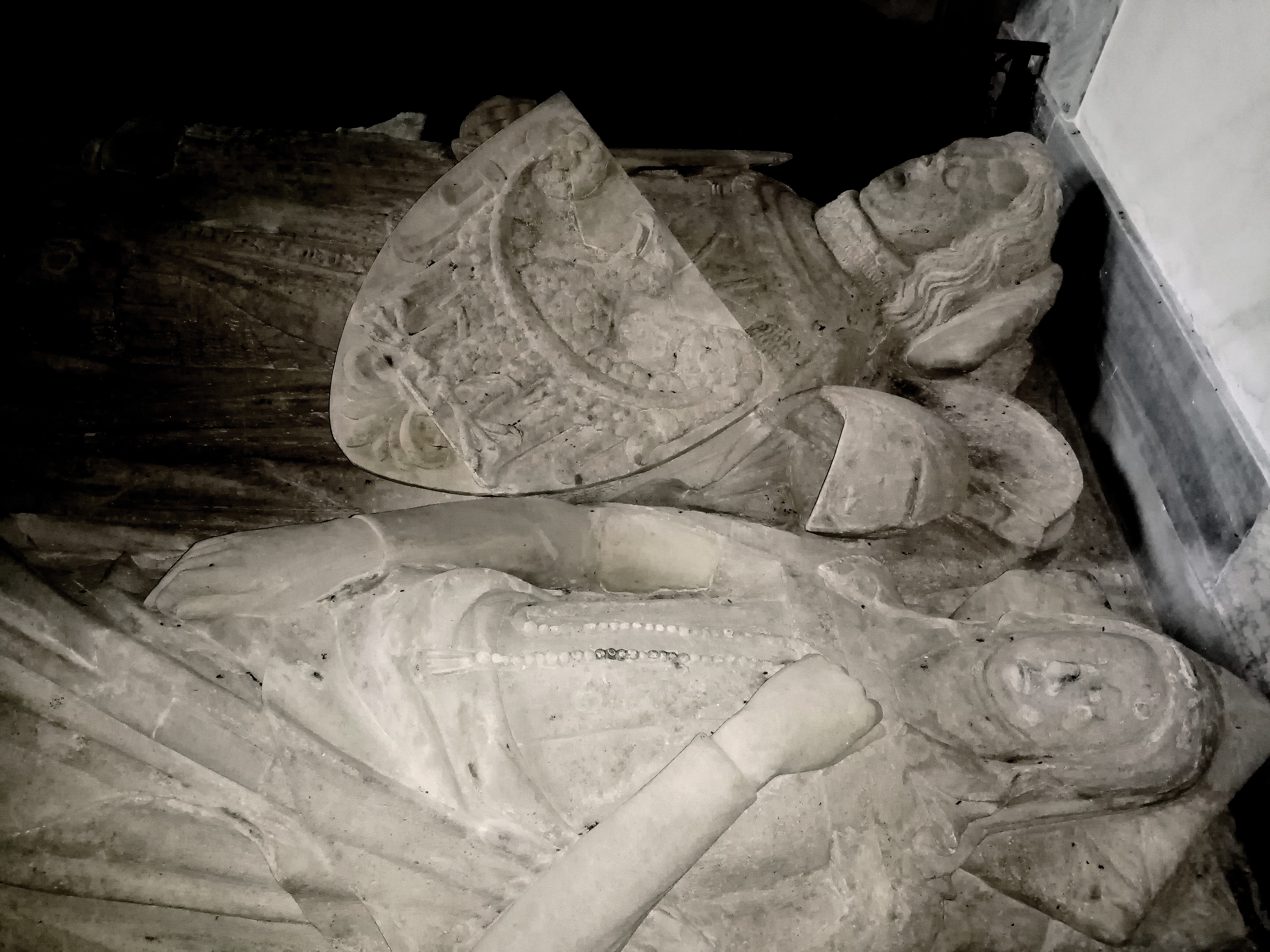
Tomb of Bolko II, the first duke of Ziębice, and his wife Bonne de Savoie in Henryków

After the death of Henry IV in 1290, during the period of fragmentation of Poland, Bolko I the Strict inherited the towns of Münsterberg (Ziębice) and Frankenstein (Ząbkowice Śląskie). Around 1300, he finished a castle in Münsterberg. When he died in 1301, his possessions were divided among his three sons. The youngest son, Bolko II Ziębicki, received Münsterberg (Ziębice) in 1321 and was the first to style himself Duke of Münsterberg. He resided in the town's castle. After he demanded land from the diocese's domains, a long-running dispute with the Bishop of Breslau arose, and the bishop imposed an interdict over the duchy several times, while the duke was anathematized. After the siege of Frankenstein by the Moravian margrave (later Holy Roman Emperor) Charles IV, Bolko II recognized Bohemian suzerainty on 29 August 1336 in the Treaty of Straubing. Bolko II died in 1341; he was buried in the church of the Henryków (Heinrichau) monastery, a monastery he generously supported during his lifetime.

Bolko's son, Nicholas the Small, was Duke of Münsterberg until 1358. In the year of his father's death, he paid homage to Bohemian king John of Luxembourg and his son Charles. Nicholas' successor, Bolko III, died in 1410. The next dukes, the brothers Henry († 1420) and Jan, ruled the duchy together until 1420; afterward Jan ruled alone. Jan died on 27 December 1428 at the Battle of Altwilmsdorf against the Hussites. With him the Piast dukes of Münsterberg died out.

== Bohemian rule ==
With the death of Duke Jan, the duchy passed to Bohemian king Sigismund, who pledged it to Půta III of Častolovice, lord of Častolovice, in 1429. After Půta III's death in 1434, his widow, Anna of Koldice, kept the bond and ruling claims. However, the estates of Münsterberg favored countess Euphemia of Oettingen, a niece of the last duke. She gained Münsterberg in 1435, but abandoned it a year later because of continuing disputes. Although Anna of Koldice sold her possessions in 1440 to Hynek Krušina of Lichtenburg, whom she married shortly thereafter, new succession disputes with the estates erupted, in which several Silesian princes supported the estates of Münsterberg. In 1442, Hynek Krušina looted the Heinrichau monastery, since it was particularly associated with the estates. After lengthy negotiations, the estates of Münsterberg on 25 April 1443 chose duke Vilém of Opava as their new ruler. His claims were justified by two reasons. First, he was the son of Přemysl of Opava of the Přemyslid dynasty and Catherine, the sister of Jan of Ziębice, the last Piast ruler. Second, he was married to Salome, a daughter of the late Půta III. Vilém joined forces with the Bishop of Wroclaw and the Silesian princes, who fought against Hynek Krušina. Although Hynek Krušina had not legally abandoned his claims, the dispute was settled in 1444.

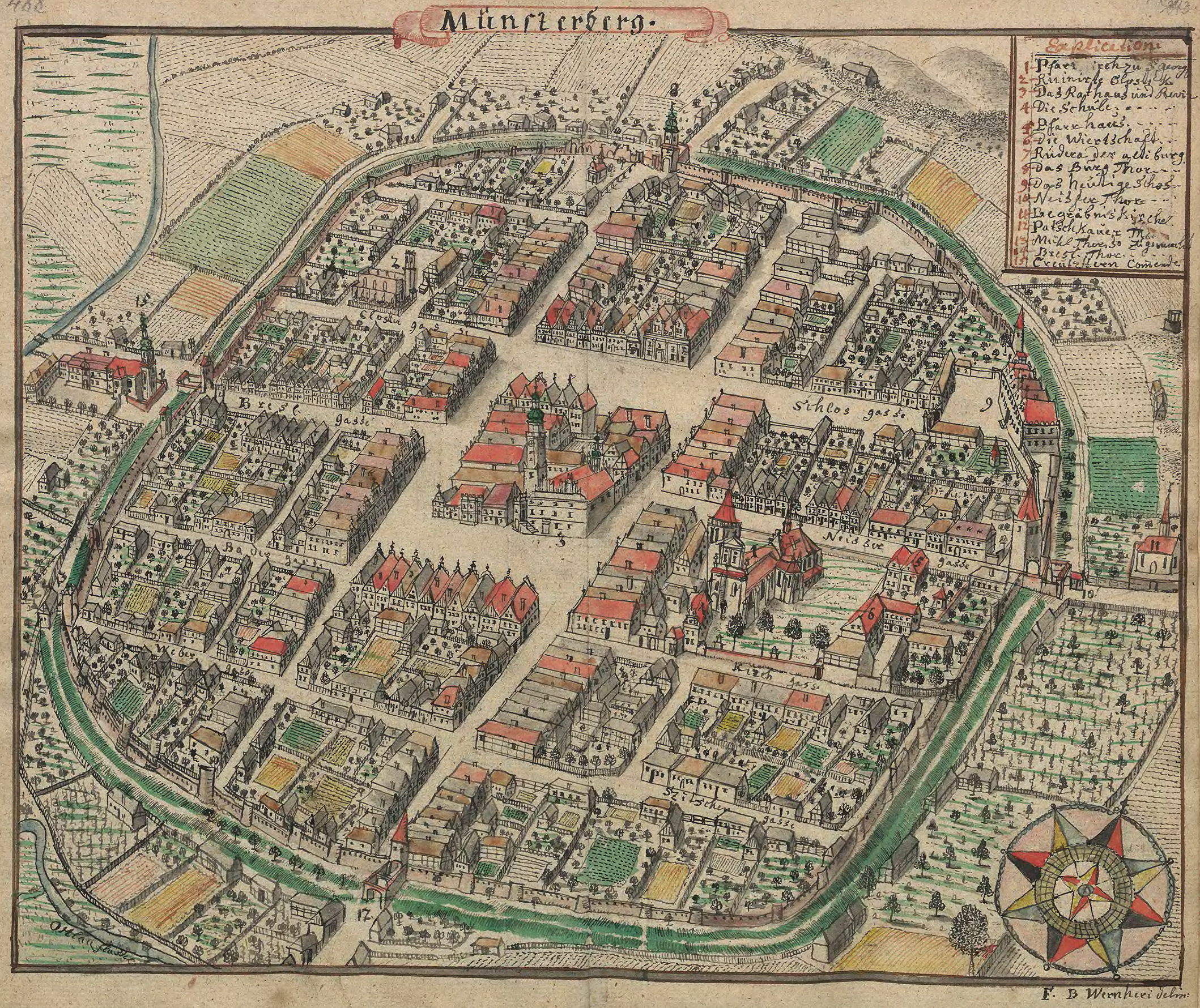
Münsterberg (Ziębice) around 1750

After Vilém's death in 1452, the duchy passed to his brother Arnošt, who sold it in 1456 to Bohemian king George of Poděbrady. The King handed his possessions down to his sons Victor, Henry the Elder and Henry the Younger in 1472. Henry the Elder, who was married to Ursula of Brandenburg, a daughter of Elector Albrecht III of Brandenburg, received the Duchy of Münsterberg. He also got Frankenstein (Ząbkowice Śląskie), the County of Kladsko, the dominion of Náchod, and the former east Bohemian possessions of Půta III. In 1488, he built a castle in Münsterberg and in 1495 obtained the duchy of Oels. He resided in Kladsko (Glatz, Kłodzko), where he died in 1498.

He was succeeded by his sons Albert, George and Charles, who ruled together. The latter moved his residence to Frankenstein in 1530, where he died six years later and was buried in the parish church. His sons, Joachim, Henry, John and George, supporters of the Reformation, ruled jointly until 1542. In the same year, they pledged the indebted duchy to their uncle, Duke Frederick II of Legnica († 1547). In 1551, Bohemian king Ferdinand I redeemed the duchy from Duke Frederick III of Legnica. Between 1552 and 1559 it belonged to Queen Isabella of Hungary as a pledged lordship. In 1559, the duchy passed into the hands of duke John of Oels, a son of Charles I of Münsterberg, and thus returned to the House of Poděbrady.

After John's successor, Charles Christopher, died childless in 1569, Münsterberg reverted to the Crown of Bohemia. Because of his contributions to the House of Habsburg, King Ferdinand III in 1654 gave the duchy to a Prince of the Holy Roman Empire, count Johann Weikhard of Auersperg.

== Prussian rule ==
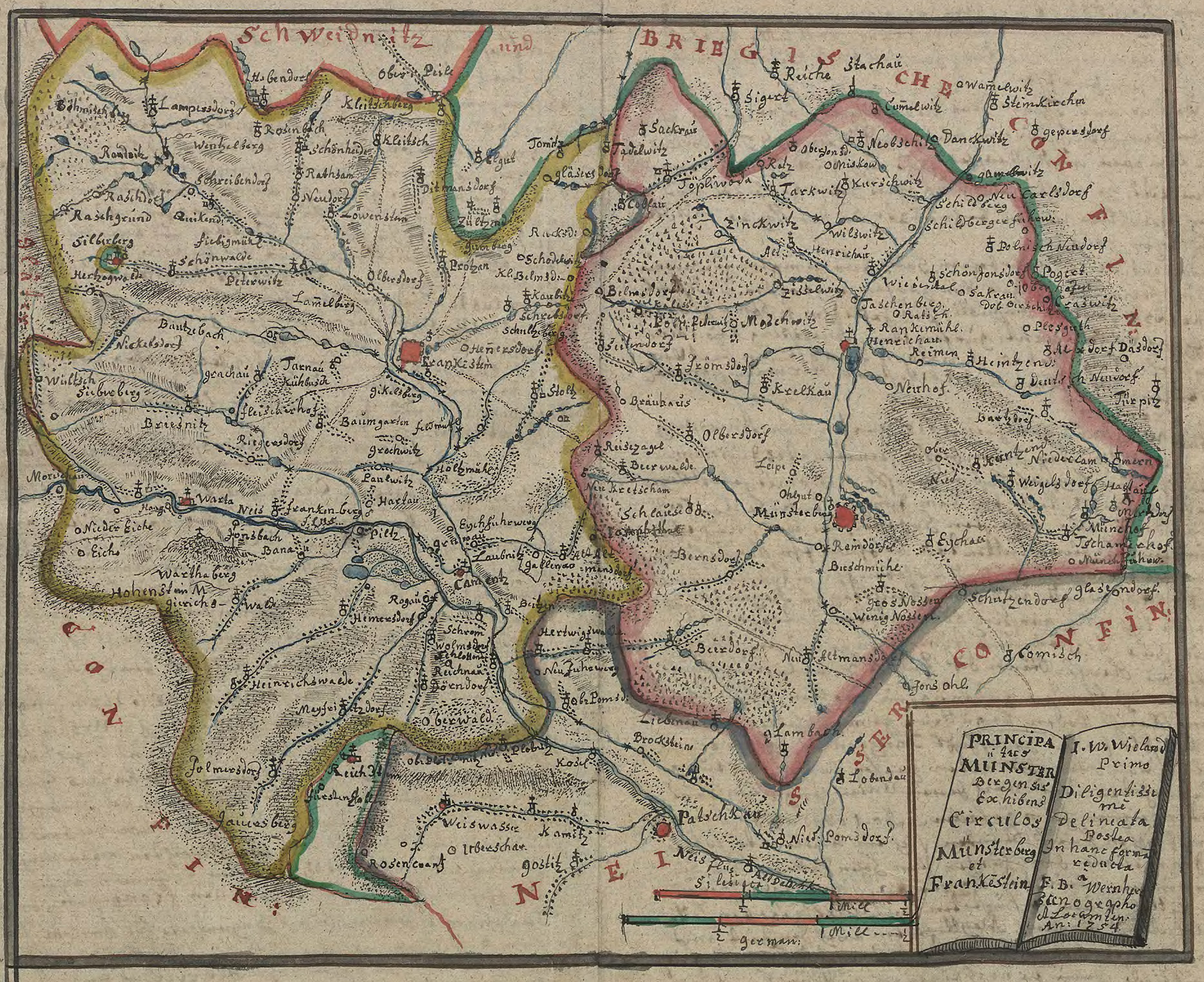
Map of the duchy from the 18th century

After the First Silesian War and the incorporation of Silesia into Prussia in 1742, the Auerspergs retained their possessions. The duchy however was converted into a State country. In 1791, Prince Charles Joseph Anton of Auersperg sold the duchy to Prussian King Frederick William II.

== Dukes of Münsterberg ==
- 1301–1341 Bolko II († 1341)
- 1341–1351 Nicholas the Small († 1358), son of Bolko II.
- 1351–1410 Bolko III († 1410), son of Nicholas the Small
- 1410–1420 Henry II († 1420), son of Bolko III
- 1410–1428 John I † 1428, son of Bolko III

The duchy passes to Bohemian king Sigismund.

- 1429–1434 Půta III of Častolovice († 1434)
- 1435–1436 Euphemia († 1447), sister of John I, renounced her right
- 1437–1440 Anna of Koldice († 1467), widow of Půta III of Častolovice
- 1440–1443 Hynek Krušina of Lichtenburg († 1454), acquired the bonds from Anna, whom he married three weeks later
- 1443–1452 Vilém of Opava († 1452), son of Přemysl of Opava of the Přemyslid dynasty and Katharine, sister of John I († 1428), the last Piast duke of Münsterberg.
- 1452–1456 Arnošt of Opava († 1464), brother of Vilém; sold Münsterberg in 1456 to Bohemian king George of Poděbrady.
- 1456–1462 George of Poděbrady († 1471)
- 1462–1498 Henry I "the Older" of Poděbrady († 1498), son of George of Poděbrady, Prince of the Empire, count of Kladsko, since 1495 also duke of Oels, together with:
  - 1462–1471 Viktorin of Münsterberg († 1500)
  - 1462–1471 Henry the Younger of Poděbrady († 1492)

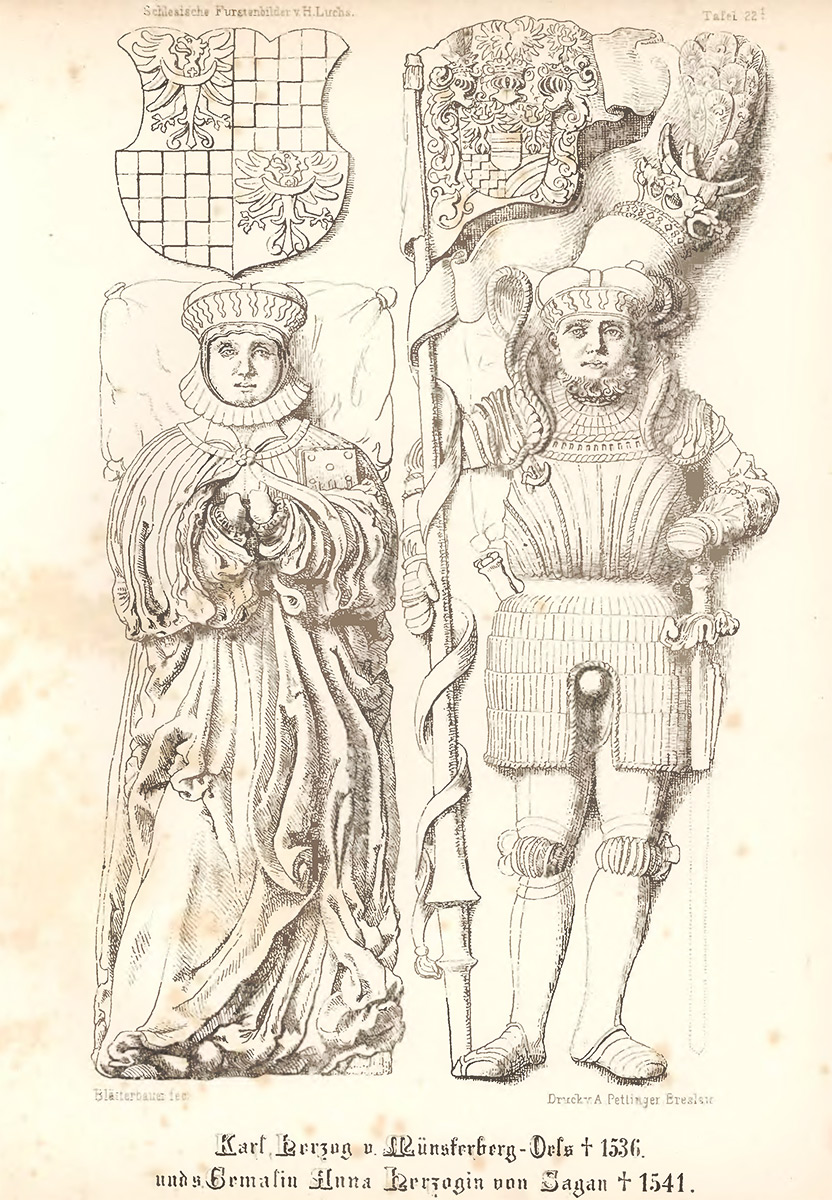
Charles of Poděbrady and his wife Anna of Sagan

- 1498–1536 Charles I of Poděbrady († 1536), son of Henry the Older, duke of Oels, count of Kladsko; together with:
  - 1498–1502 George I of Poděbrady († 1502), son of Henry the Older, duke of Oels, count of Kladsko
  - 1498–1511 Albert I of Poděbrady († 1511), son of Henry the Older, duke of Oels, count of Kladsko
- 1536–1542 Joachim, Henry II, John and George II of Poděbrady, sons of Charles I, pledged Münsterberg to their uncle:
- 1542–1547 Frederick II, Duke of Liegnitz († 1547)
- 1547–1552 Ferdinand I
- 1552–1559 Isabella of Hungary
- 1559–1565 John, Duke of Münsterberg-Oels, son of Charles I
- 1565: Charles Christopher of Münsterberg
- 1565–1654 Reversion to king of Bohemia
- 1654–1677 Johann Weikhard of Auersperg
- 1677–1705 Johann Ferdinand of Auersperg, son of Johann Weikhard
- 1705–1713 Franz Karl of Auersperg, brother of Ferdinand Franz
- 1713–1783 Henry Joseph John of Auersperg, son of Franz Karl
- 1783–1791 Karl Joseph of Auersperg
- 1791 sold to the Prussian Hohenzollerns
- 1795 sold to Ludwig Wilhelm von Schlabrendorf
