= Ziębice =

Town in Lower Silesian Voivodeship, Poland

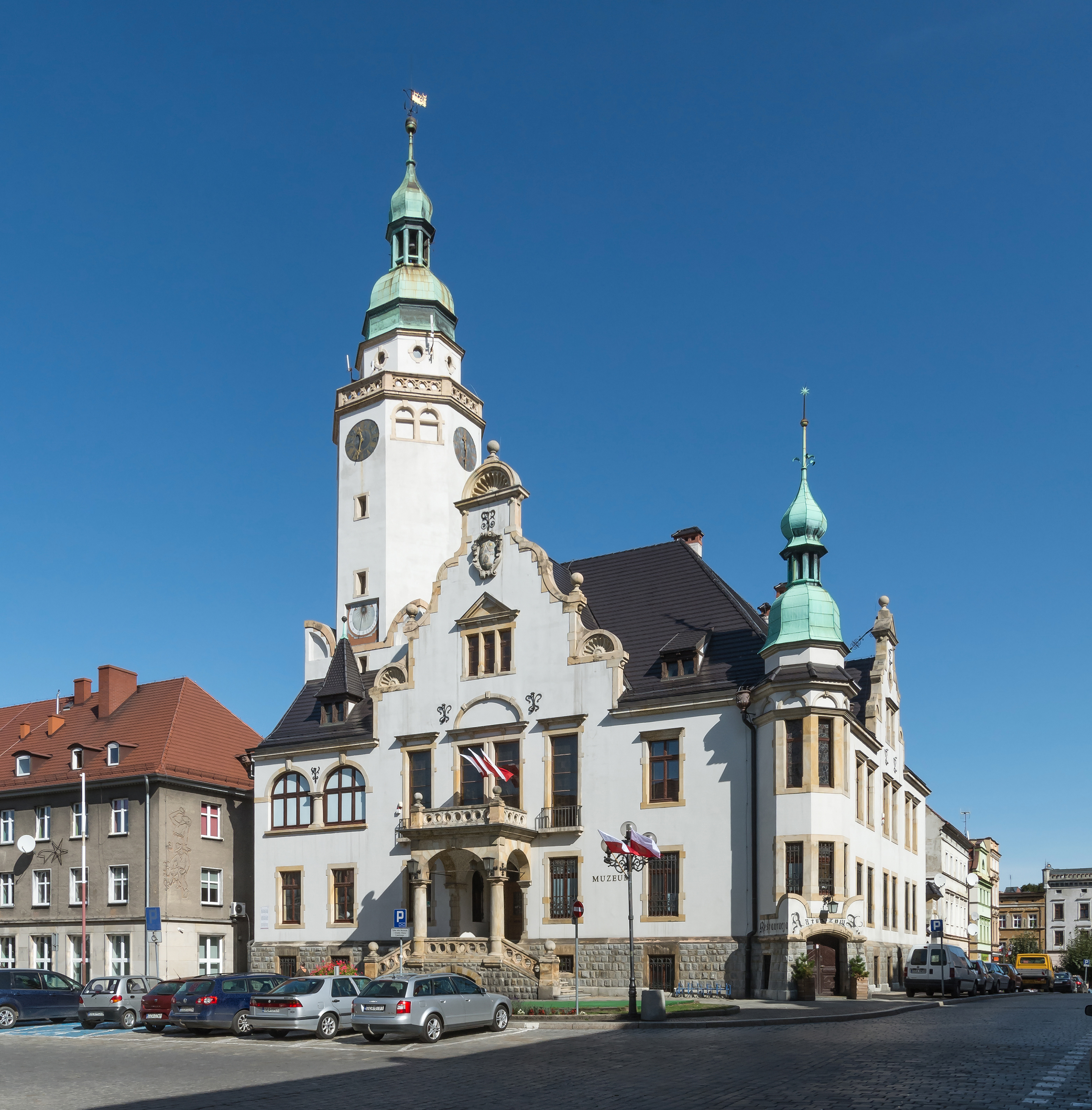
- Town hall

- Flag Coat of arms

- Location within Poland
- Coordinates: 50°36′N 17°2′E
- Country: Poland
- Voivodeship: Lower Silesian
- County: Ząbkowice
- Gmina: Ziębice
- First mentioned: 1234

Area
  - Total: 15.07 km^{2} (5.82 sq mi)

Population (2019-06-30)
  - Total: 8,708
  - Density: 577.8/km^{2} (1,497/sq mi)
- Time zone: UTC+1 (CET)
  - Summer (DST): UTC+2 (CEST)
- Postal code: 57-220
- Vehicle registration: DZA
- Website: http://www.ziebice.pl

Ziębice [ʑɛmˈbit͡sɛ] (German: Münsterberg) is a town in Ząbkowice County, Lower Silesian Voivodeship, in south-western Poland. It is the seat of the administrative district (gmina) called Gmina Ziębice.

Founded in the Middle Ages, Ziębice was the seat of a local line of the Piast dynasty from 1322 to 1521. It contains an Old Town with a preserved Market Square and the landmark Romanesque-Gothic Saint George Basilica, listed as a Historic Monument of Poland.

As of 2019, the town has a population of 8,708.

== History ==
The area became part of the emerging Polish state under its first historic ruler Mieszko I in the 10th century. The town was first mentioned in 1234 under the Old Polish spelling Sambice. This Polish town was probably destroyed in 1241 during the first Mongol invasion of Poland. According to records, a new town under German town law, called Munsterberck (1253) or Sambiz videlicet Munsterberg (1268). The town became home of a German-speaking population as the result of Ostsiedlung. As a result of the fragmentation of Poland, it formed part of the duchies of Silesia until 1290, Świdnica until 1322, and afterwards it was the capital of a small eponymous duchy, remaining under the rule of the Piast dynasty until 1521. In 1344, a court was established in the town by the Piast dukes.

In 1521 it passed to the Podiebrad family, and in 1569 it passed to the kings of Bohemia. The town suffered in the Hussite Wars and Thirty Years' War, and in 1643, it was hit by an epidemic. In 1742, it became part of Prussia and was the capital of Kreis Münsterberg. In 1842, the town had a population of 3,946, predominantly Catholic by confession. In 1871, it became part of the German Empire along with the bulk of Silesia. Following Germany's defeat in World War II, in 1945, it became again part of Poland, although with a Soviet-installed communist regime, which stayed in power until the Fall of Communism in the 1980s. The German population was expelled. In the following years, the Polish anti-communist resistance was active in Ziębice, including the nationwide Home Army-NIE-Freedom and Independence Association.

== Demographics ==
Historical population

Year	Pop.	±%
1871	5,491	—
1880	5,980	+8.9%
1890	6,162	+3.0%
1900	8,159	+32.4%
1910	8,632	+5.8%

Year	Pop.	±%
1925	8,427	−2.4%
1939	8,923	+5.9%
1950	7,810	−12.5%
1960	9,812	+25.6%
2010	9,107	−7.2%

== Culture ==
Ziębice hosts Poland's only Museum of Home Appliances.

== Sports ==
The local football club is Sparta Ziębice. It competes in the lower leagues.

== Notable people ==
- Karl Denke (1860–1924), serial killer
- Edyta Górniak (born 1972), singer
- Janusz Kamiński (born 1959), cinematographer
- Karl Weigert (1845–1904), pathologist

== Twin towns – sister cities ==
See twin towns of Gmina Ziębice.

== Gallery ==
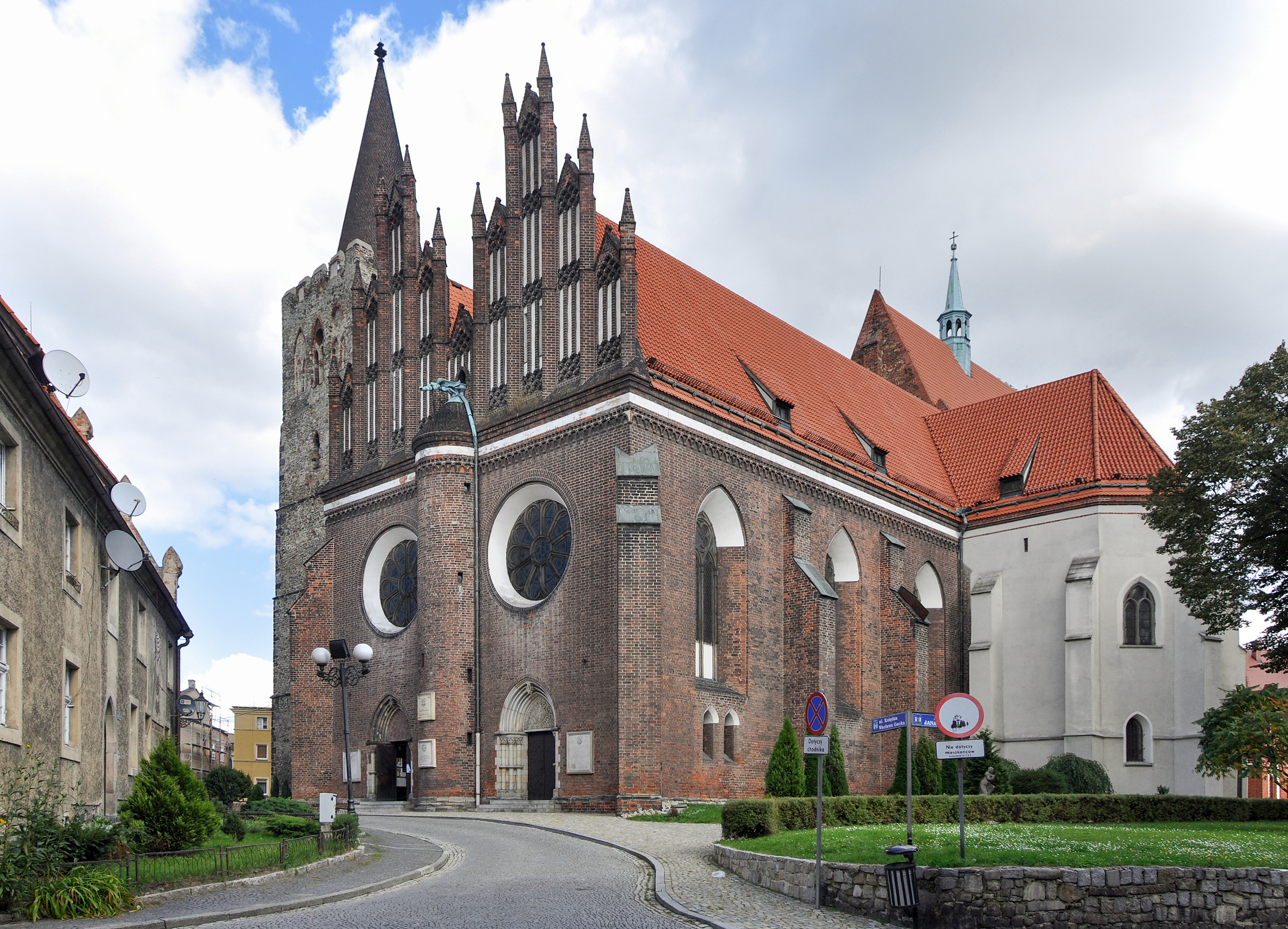
Gothic Saint George Basilica

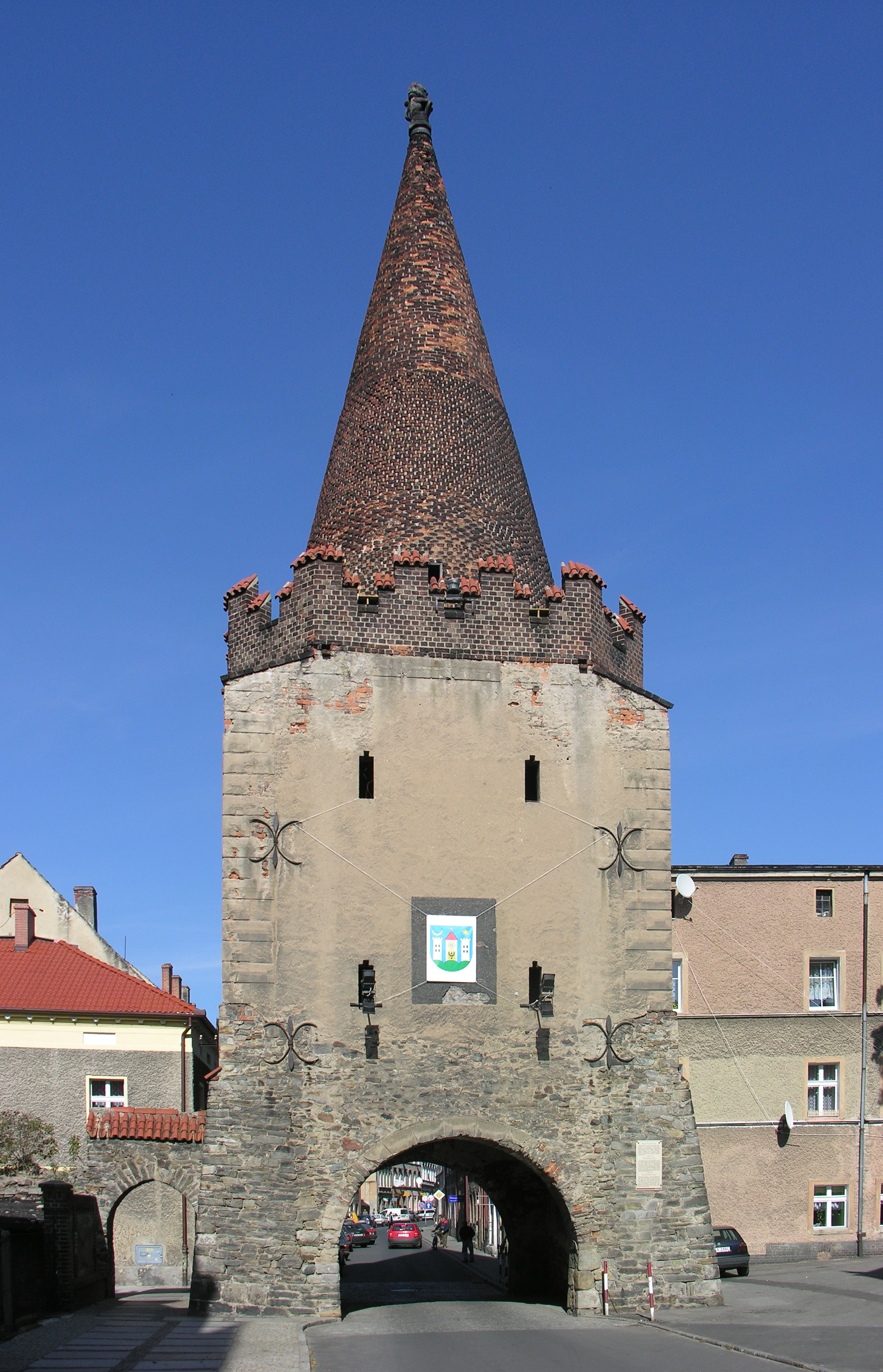
Medieval Paczkowska Gate

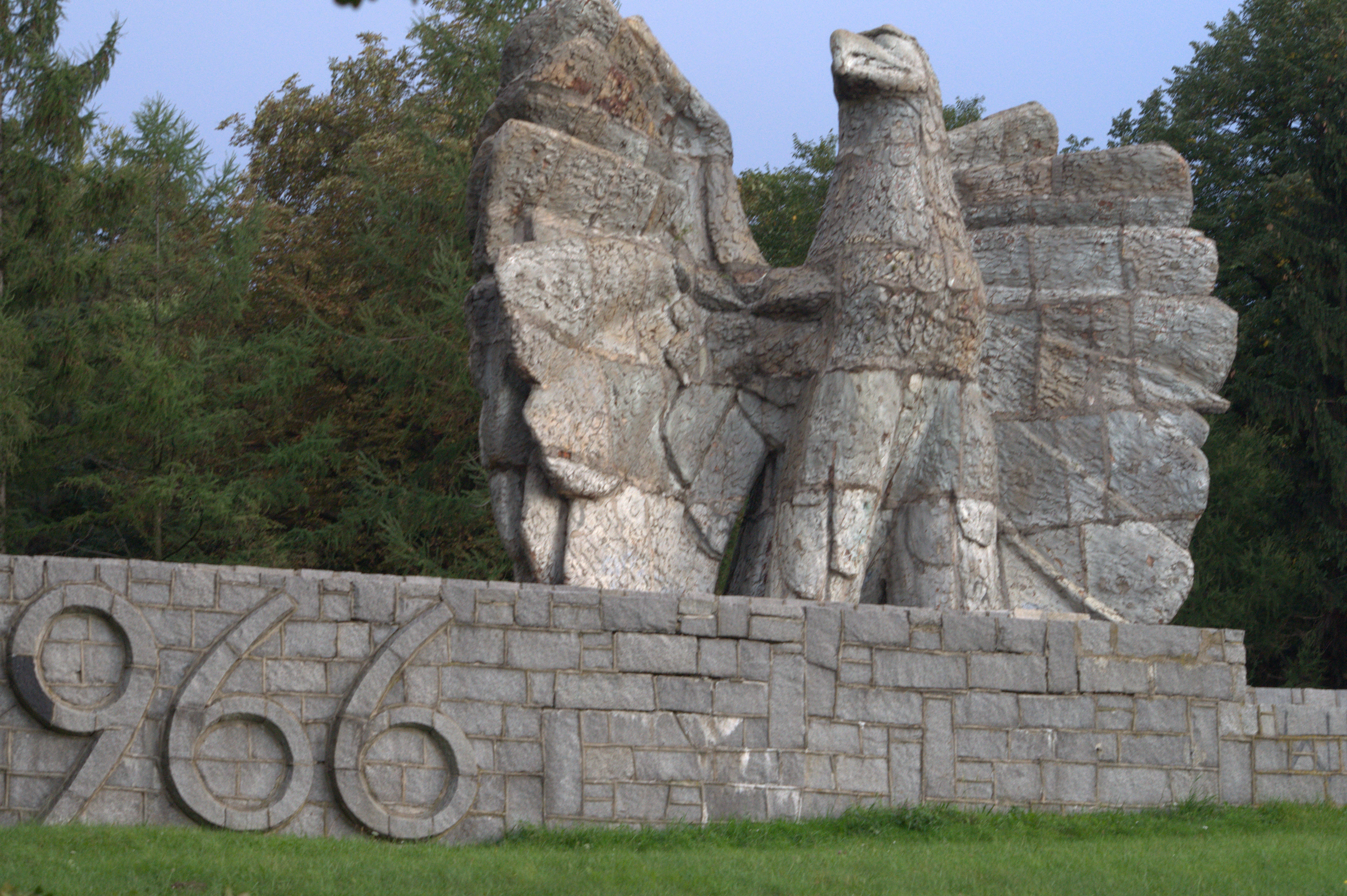
Piast Eagle monument

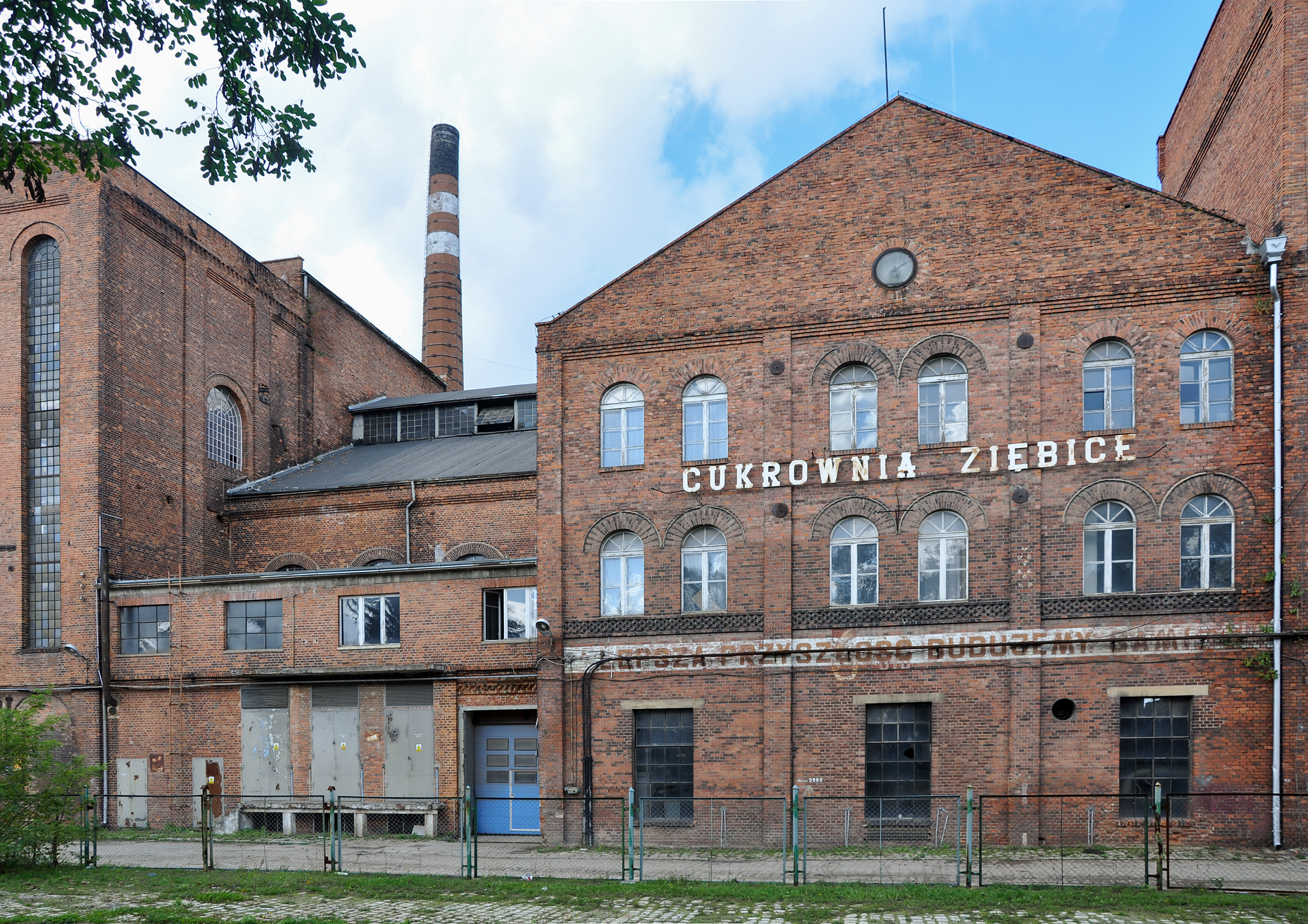
Ziębice Sugar Refinery
