= County of Kladsko =

Historical administrative unit of Bohemia

Coordinates: 50°22′N 16°38′E

County of Kladsko Kladské hrabství (Czech) Grafschaft Glatz (German) Hrabstwo kłodzkie (Polish)
- 1459–1818
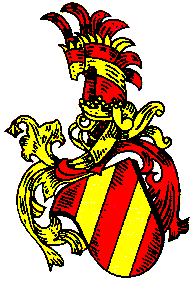
- Coat of arms

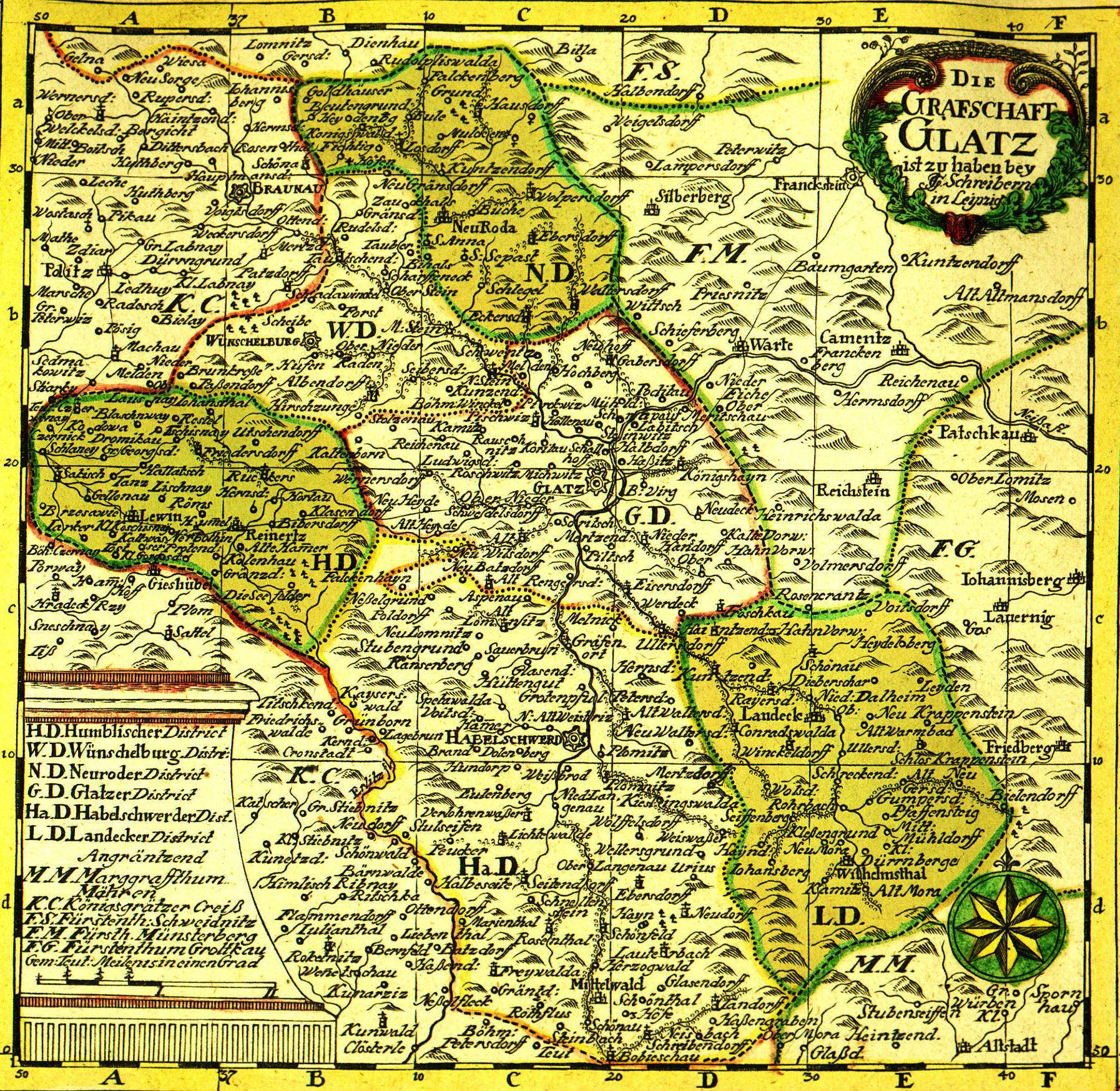
- Grafschaft Glatz, 18th century
- Status: Fiefdom of the Kingdom of Bohemia (until 1742); Part of the Kingdom of Prussia (1742–1818)
- Capital: Kłodzko (Kladsko)
- Common languages: Latin (officially); Czech; German; Polish
- Religion: Roman Catholicism; Protestantism
- Government: County
- History
  - Duchy of Bohemia • Duchy of Poland • Definitely within Bohemia: 870; 1003; 1137
  - Raised to county by George of Podiebrad: 1459
  - Habsburg rule: 1526
  - Annexed by Prussia: 1742
  - Abolished de facto and incorporated into Prussian Silesia: 1818
  - Abolished de jure along with the Prussian monarchy: 1918
  - Fell to Poland: 1945
Preceded by	Succeeded by
Kingdom of Bohemia	Province of Silesia
- Today part of: Poland

The County of Kladsko (Czech: Kladské hrabství, German: Grafschaft Glatz, Polish: Hrabstwo kłodzkie) was a historical administrative unit within Bohemia as a part of the Kingdom of Bohemia and later in the Kingdom of Prussia with its capital at Kłodzko (Kladsko) on the Nysa river. The territory comprises the Kłodzko Land with the Kłodzko Valley in center within the Sudetes mountain range and roughly corresponds with the present-day Kłodzko County in the Polish Lower Silesian Voivodeship.

== History ==
=== Beginnings ===
The area has been populated at least since the 1st century BC. The earliest mention of the town itself is in the 12th century Chronica Boëmorum by Cosmas of Prague. He mentions the town of Cladzco as belonging to the Bohemian nobleman Slavník in 981, father of Bishop Adalbert of Prague and progenitor of the Slavník dynasty.

=== Bohemian–Polish borderland ===
Held by the Přemyslid dukes of Bohemia, the town was also claimed by the Polish kings, which led to a series of armed conflicts: King Bolesław I Chrobry campaigned Kladsko in 1003, but soon after was expelled by Emperor Henry II. In 1080 the Polish duke Władysław I Herman married Judith Přemyslid, daughter of the Bohemian duke Bretislav I and their son, the warlike Duke Bolesław III Wrymouth claimed Kladsko as the dowry of his mother. In turn the Bohemian prince (duke from 1125) Soběslav I campaigned Kladsko and burnt the town to the ground, but rebuilt it shortly afterwards. He also rebuilt and strengthened the castle located on a high rock overlooking the town.

=== A region of Bohemia ===
In 1137 by the agency of Emperor Lothair III of Supplinburg the rivals finally concluded a peace treaty by which Bolesław ceded all claims to the land of Kladsko to Soběslav. The area thereafter remained an integral part of Bohemia, though the fief was at times held by Silesian dukes: around 1280 German king Rudolph I of Habsburg, having defeated King Ottokar II of Bohemia, gave Kladsko to his ally Duke Henry IV Probus of the Silesian Piasts; it nevertheless returned to Bohemia after Henry's death in 1290. In 1310 Count John the Blind from the House of Luxembourg by marriage inherited Bohemia and again granted Kladsko for life to the Piast dukes Henry VI the Good from 1327 to 1335 and Bolko II of Ziębice from 1336 to 1341.

In 1348 the Provincia Glacensis became – still as a region within the Bohemia proper – part of the Crown of Bohemia. The town developed rapidly until the start of the Hussite Wars in the 15th century, which left Kladsko depopulated by plagues, partially burnt, and demolished by several consecutive floods. It was not until the 16th century that the local economy began to recover from the previous wars.

In 1458 King George of Poděbrady, with the consent of Emperor Frederick III of Habsburg, elevated Kladsko to a county (hrabství Kladské), held by his second son Viktorin, who thereby received the status of an Imperial count (Reichsgraf). Under his Poděbrad successors it still remained an integral part of Bohemia as an "outer region" (vnější kraj) south of the adjacent Silesian province.

When in 1526 Archduke Ferdinand I of Austria from the House of Habsburg was enthroned as King of Bohemia, the County too became part of the Habsburg monarchy; however the local counts retained their powers and the Bohemian kings ruled this land as suzerains. From 1549 the County of Kladsko was under administration of the Bavarian Wittelsbachs until Albert V, Duke of Bavaria released it in 1567 for Emperor Maximilian II.

In 1617 the first census was organised in the county. The city itself had approximately 1,300 houses and over 7,000 inhabitants. However, two years after the census took place the Thirty Years' War started. Kladsko had joined the Protestant Bohemian Estates and even after the defeat at the Battle of White Mountain in 1620 refused to submit to Emperor Ferdinand II of Habsburg. Between 1619 and 1649 the town was besieged by Imperial troops several times and although the fortress was never captured, over 900 out of 1,300 buildings were destroyed by fire and artillery and the population dropped by more than a half. After the war the Habsburg rulers put an end to all local self-government, and the County existed in name only.

=== Conquest by Prussia ===
When in 1740 King Frederick II of Prussia started the First Silesian War he occupied most of Silesia and also the County of Kladsko, which the king considered to be a vital forward post at the border with the Austrian lands under Empress Maria Theresa. It was therefore occupied by Prussian troops and by the 1742 Treaty of Breslau annexed by the Kingdom of Prussia, again confirmed after the Seven Years' War by the 1763 Treaty of Hubertusburg. It was not until 1818, when King Frederick William III finally incorporated the County into the Prussian Province of Silesia, although Czech and Austrian influence is still evident in the architecture and culture of the region. The title of a "Count of Glatz" was part of the full title of the Prussian kings and German Emperors, but autonomy of the county was irretrievably lost.

=== Claim by Czechoslovakia and incorporation into Poland ===
After World War I the Czechoslovak state laid claims to the region of Kladsko, particularly because of the Czech Corner where Czech language and culture were still prevalent. These territorial demands were flatly rejected however by the 1919 Treaty of Versailles. With the implementation of the Oder-Neisse line at the Potsdam Conference in 1945, most of the territory of Prussian Silesia – including Kladsko – became part of the Republic of Poland. The latter approached the Third Czechoslovak Republic with a proposal to exchange Kladsko for Trans-Olza, but the offer was turned down. Its native German and Czech population was expelled. According to canon law however, the area was part of the Roman Catholic Archdiocese of Prague until 1972.

Proposals by the Czechoslovak Delegation on incorporating Kłodzko Land into Czechoslovakia during the Paris Peace Conference, 1919

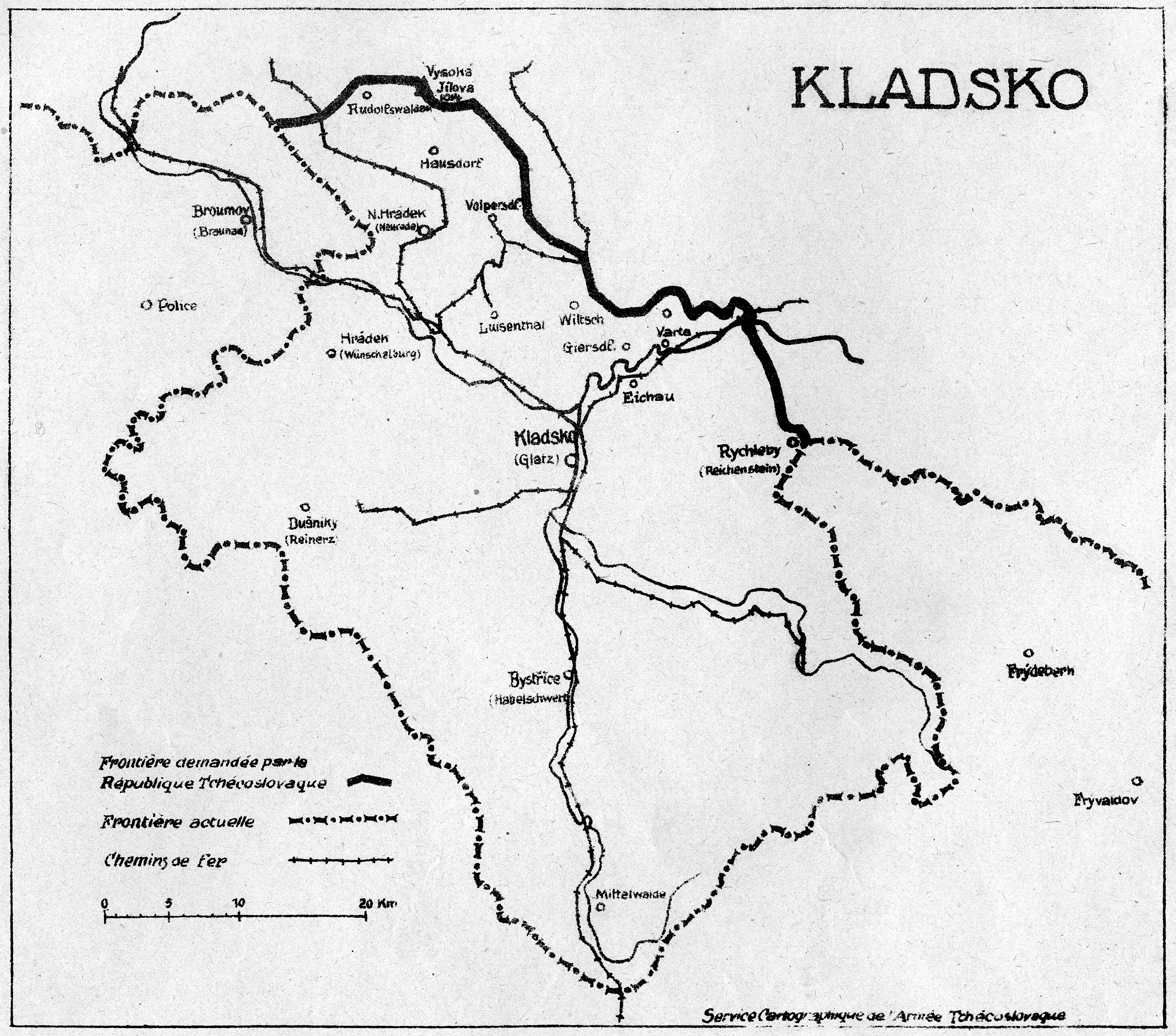
The maximalist variant

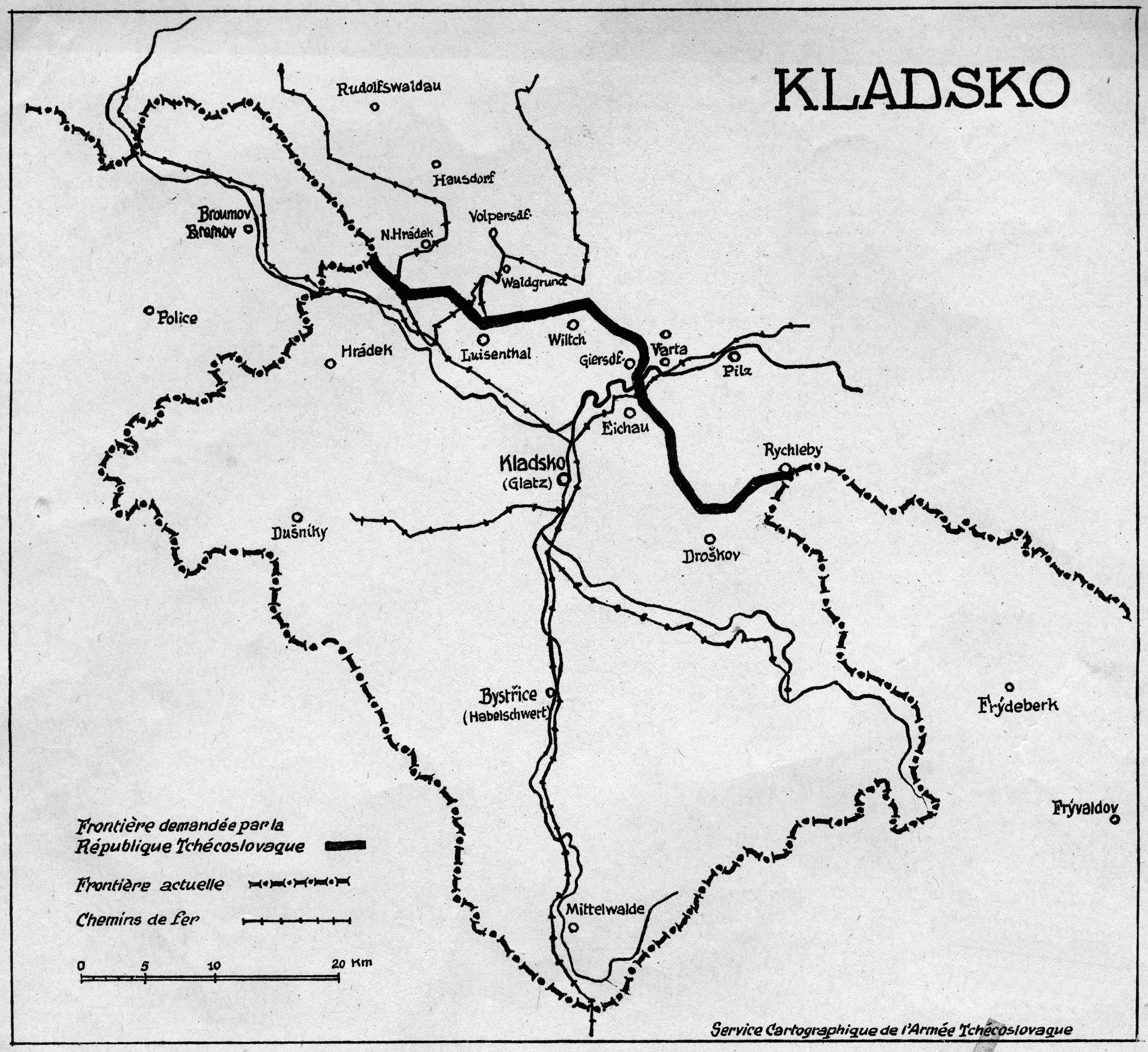
The intermediate variant

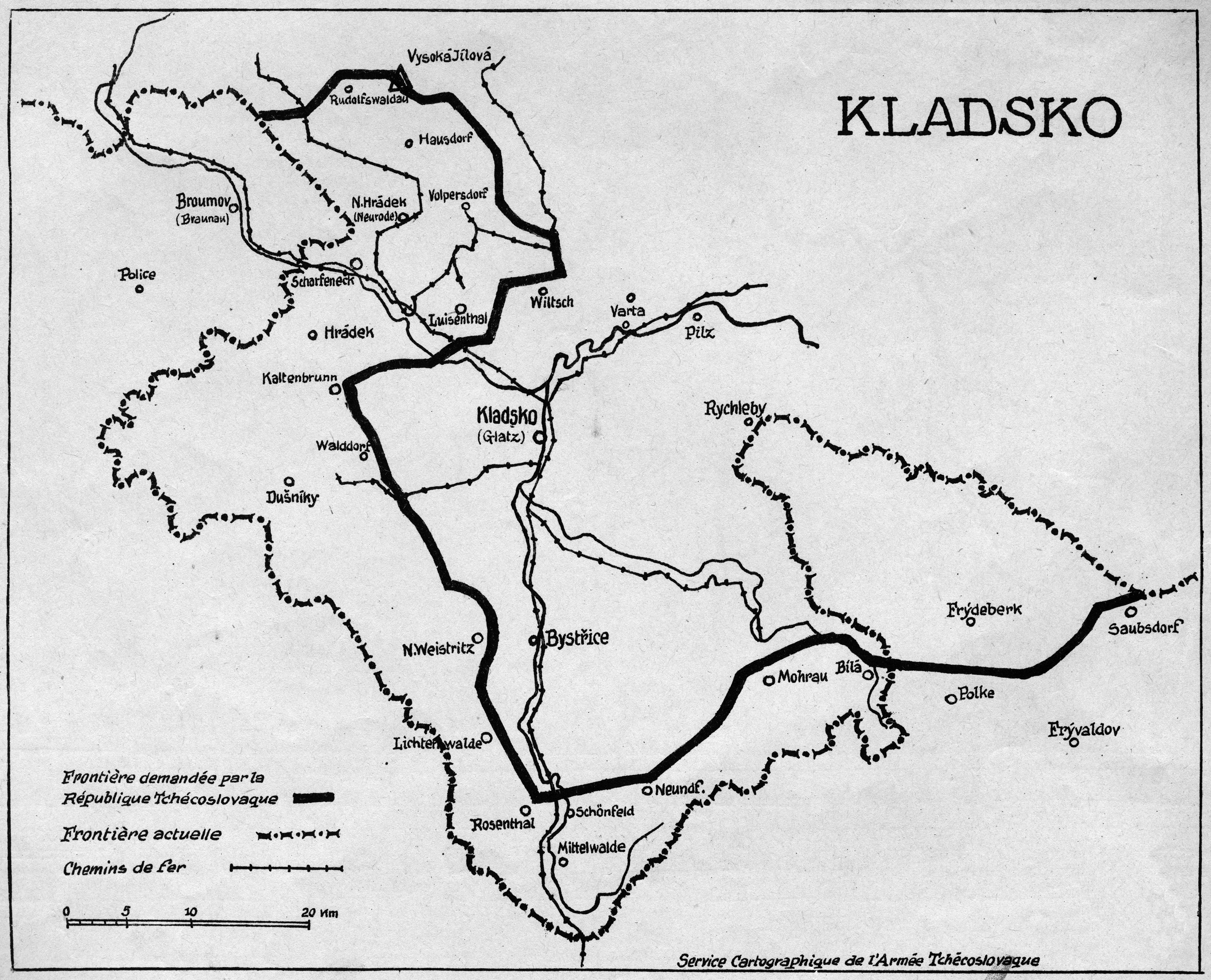
The minimalist variant

== See also ==
- Kłodzko Land
- Kladsko Borderland

== Bibliography ==
- MUSIL, František. Kladsko. Praha : Libri, 2007. 190 s. (Stručná historie států.) ISBN 978-80-7277-340-4.
- A. Herzig, M. Ruchniewicz, Dzieje Ziemi Kłodzkiej, wyd. Dobu Verlag/wyd. Oficyna Wydawnicza Atut, Hamburg/Wrocław 2006.
- Peter Güttler: Das Glatzer Land. Düsseldorf 1995, ISBN 3-928508-03-2
- Ondřej Felcman, Ladislav Hladký, Jaroslav Šůla: Právní postavení Kladska v Českém státě do roku 1742. In: Kladský Sborník 2, 1998, p. 9–33
