= Krzeszowskie Wzgórza =

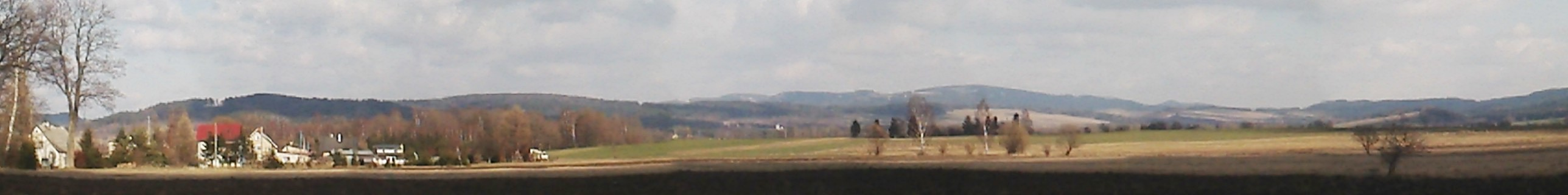
- Krzeszowskie Wzgórza seen from Lipienica

Highest point
- Peak: Góra Ziuty
- Elevation: 631 m (2,070 ft)
- Coordinates: 50°43′49″N 16°06′46″E

Geography
- Country: Poland
- State: Lower Silesia

Krzeszowskie Wzgórza (Polish pronunciation: [ˈkʐɛʂɔvskiɛ ˌvzɡuʐa]) is part of the micro-region of Kotlina Krzeszowska located within the Kotlina Kamiennogórska in Central Sudetes. It borders with Czary Las and Pasmo Lesistej in Stone Mountains; from the north-east.

== Peaks ==
Polish name	German name	Elevation	Photo
Czerep	Todtenkopf, Todten kopf	581 m a.s.l.	
Garbacz	Seidelberg	596 m a.s.l.	
Góra Świętej Anny	Annaberg, Annen berg	593 m a.s.l.	
Góra Ziuty	Buchberg	631 m a.s.l.	
Trębna	Trommelberg	590 m a.s.l.	
	Post Berg	582 m a.s.l.	

== Passes ==
Polish name	German name	Elevation
Przełęcz Grzędzka		531 m a.s.l.
Przełęcz Żłób	Der Pass, Der Paß	555 m a.s.l.

== Localities ==
The following settlements are located in this region: Grzędy, Grzędy Górne, Krzeszów, Krzeszówek, Kochanów.

== Bibliography ==
1. Słownik geografii turystycznej Sudetów, tom 8 Kotlina Kamiennogórska, Wzgórza Bramy Lubawskiej, Zawory, red. Marek Staffa, Wydawnictwo I-BiS, Wrocław 1997, ISBN 83-85773-23-1, s. 171 i 172
2. Sudety Środkowe. Skala 1:40000. Jelenia Góra: Wydawnictwo Turystyczne Plan, 2005. ISBN 83-60044-44-9
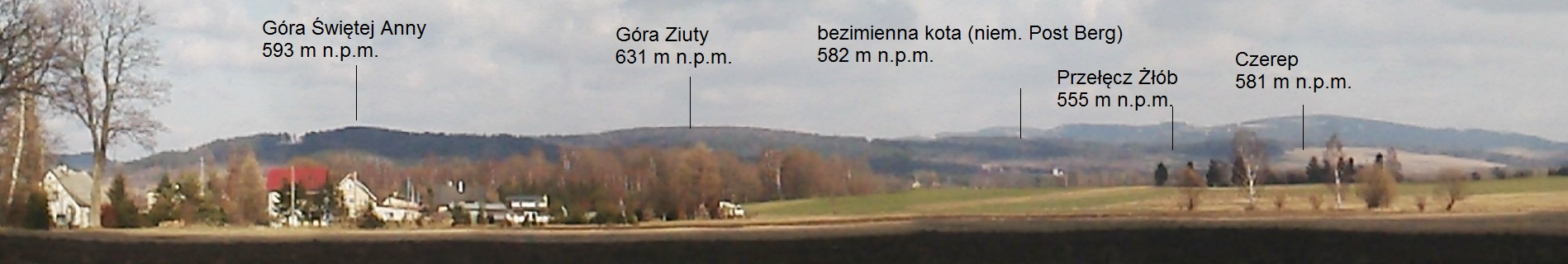
  Krzeszowskie Wzgórza seen from Lipienica
