= Trębna =

Mountain peak in Poland

- Trommelberg
- Location within Poland

Highest point
- Elevation: 590 m (1,940 ft)
- Coordinates: 50°43′15″N 16°09′33″E

Geography
- Country: Poland
- Parent range: Krzeszowskie Wzgórza

Trębna [trɛ̃bna] (German: Trommelberg, 590 m a.s.l.) is a peak in Krzeszowskie Wzgórza.

== Position ==
Trębna is located on the south-eastern slope of the Krzeszowskie Wzgórza, above Grzędy Górne. It has many small valley and ridges. Southern slope features a local road connecting Kochanów to Grzędy and Czarny Bór.

== The geological structure ==
It is made of Permian porphyry conglomerates.

== Vegetation ==
On the top and the eastern slope a forest grows, but most of the slopes are occupied by disused agricultural land.

== Bibliography ==
- Słownik Geografii Turystycznaj Sudetów, tom 8, Kotlina Kamiennogórska, Wzgórza Bramy Lubawskiej, Zawory pod red. M. Straffy, Wydawnictwo I-BiS, Wrocław 1997, 83-85773-23-1, s. 315
