= Krajanów =

- Village
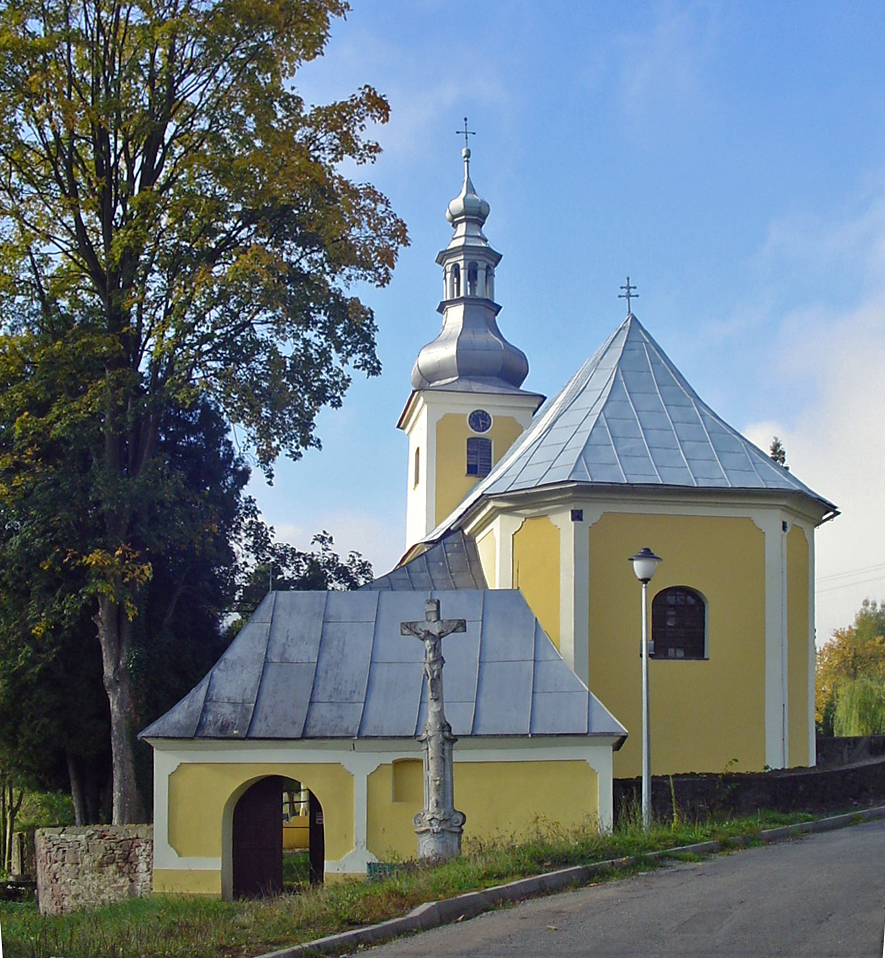
- Saint George Church

- Location within Poland
- Coordinates: 50°35′52″N 16°26′40″E
- Country: Poland
- Voivodeship: Lower Silesian
- County: Kłodzko
- Gmina: Nowa Ruda
- Population (2011): 120

Krajanów [kraˈjanuf] is a village in the administrative district of Gmina Nowa Ruda, within Kłodzko County, Lower Silesian Voivodeship, in south-western Poland. Partly due to its location along the border between Silesia and Bohemia, Krajanów has been a part of different states over its history.

As of 2011, Krajanów had a population of 120.

== Geography ==
Krajanów lies approximately 5 km (3 mi) west of Nowa Ruda, 24 kilometres (15 mi) north-west of Kłodzko, and 73 kilometres (45 mi) south-west of the regional capital Wrocław. Abutting Krajanów across the border in the Czech Republic is the municipality of Šonov in the Hradec Králové Region, located immediately south of the village.

== History ==
=== The Free Judges ===
The first written record of the existence of Krajanów is from 1353. Exactly 70 years later in 1423, a Free Judge, a class of land owners specific to the County of Kladsko and belonged to the Third Estate, is noted to have lived in Krajanów. Descended mostly from German lokators, the Free Judges were people who had been granted special privileges by the King of Bohemia to reclaim and settle uninhabited areas. German law was gradually implemented in the Czech villages which predated their arrival. These municipalities were mostly located along the roads to Prague and Brno. The estate of a Free Judge was a separate legal entity with dominium rights. Such an estate would include not only agricultural lands and forests, but also mills, craft workshops as well as a pub, along with brewing and fishing rights. The subjects had to pay rent and provide certain services. An estate could be inherited by a child of either gender. When an estate was sold, the rights and privileges belonging to the estate were included in the sale. No taxes were levied on the estate itself, only on land added later.

=== County of Kladsko ===
While under Bohemian rule the area around Kłodzko became a county in 1458. In 1631 Krajanów was described as a large settlement with its own church.

=== Annexation to Prussia and the abolition of Kladsko County ===
In 1742 Kladsko County was conquered by Prussia, and Krajanów was annexed like the rest of Kladsko County. The village was quite active economically at the time, with records from 1748 indicating the presence of a water mill, 97 farms, as well as 21 craftsmen living in Krajanów. The county was abolished in 1816, and the territory was reformed into the Landkreis Glatz of Prussian Silesia.

Like neighboring Lower Silesia, the locals were subject to Germanization by the Prussian government over the following decades. Nonetheless, the village continued to prosper through the first half of the 19th century under Prussian rule. In 1840, Krajanów had 102 buildings, including: a church, a Catholic school, two farms as well as a water mill. There were also 57 cotton and 20 linen workshops, with a sizable number of locals engaged in the weaving industry. Although the village began to depopulate in the mid-nineteenth century, records show both a manor and an inn in Krajanów in 1870.

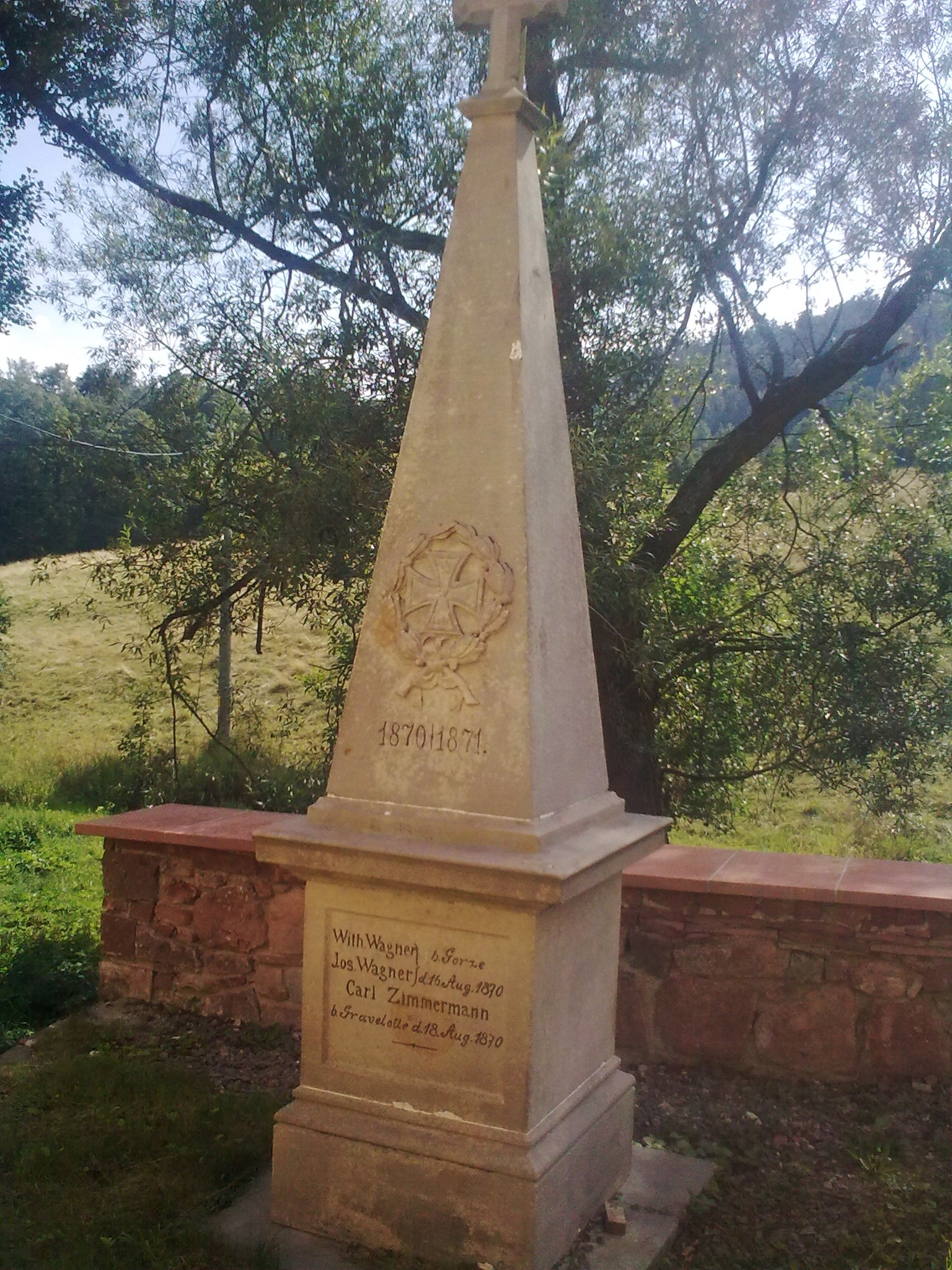
Inscription on a monument commemorating to those who lost their lives in the Franco-Prussian War

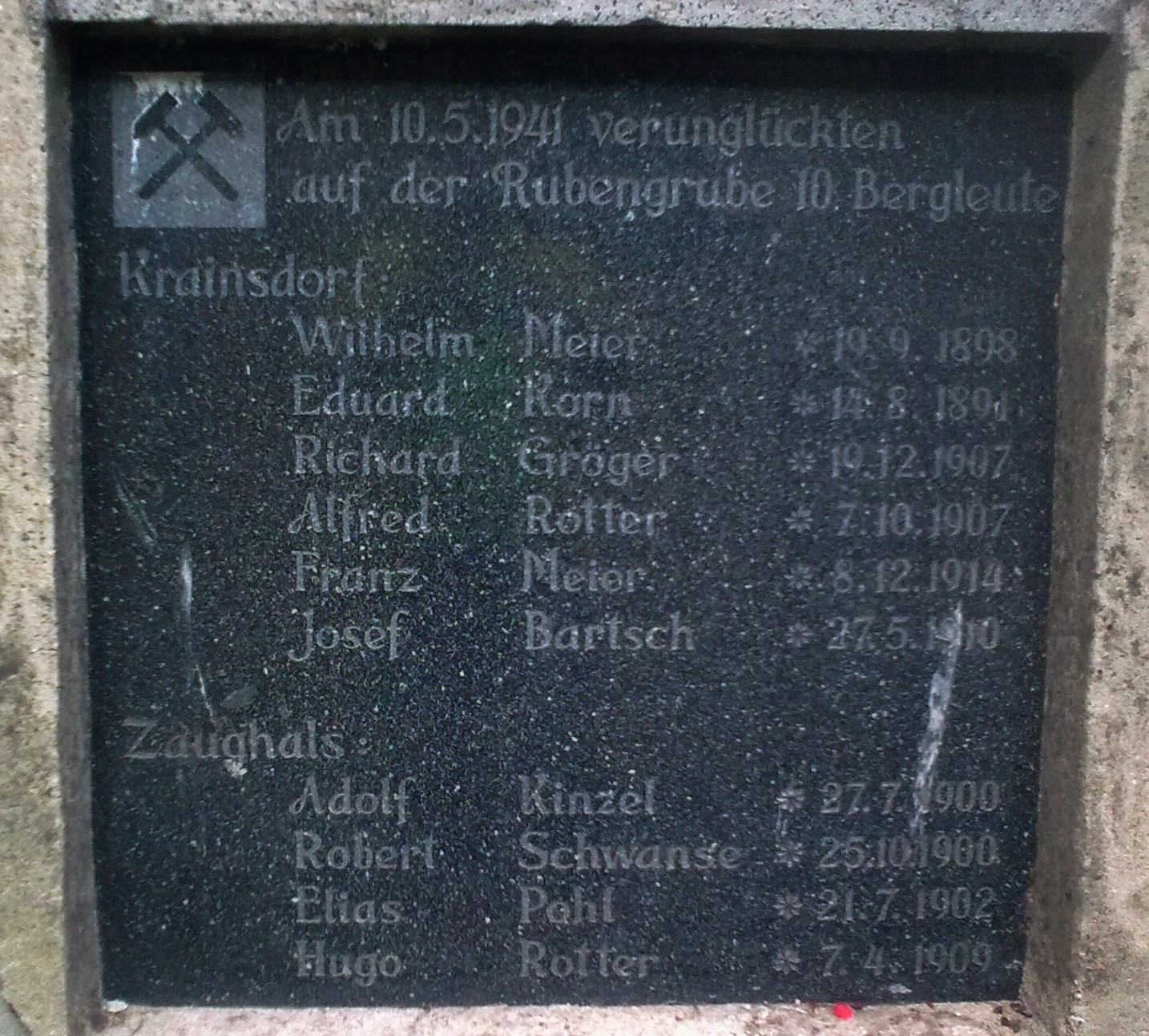
Monument dedicated to the victims of a mining accident

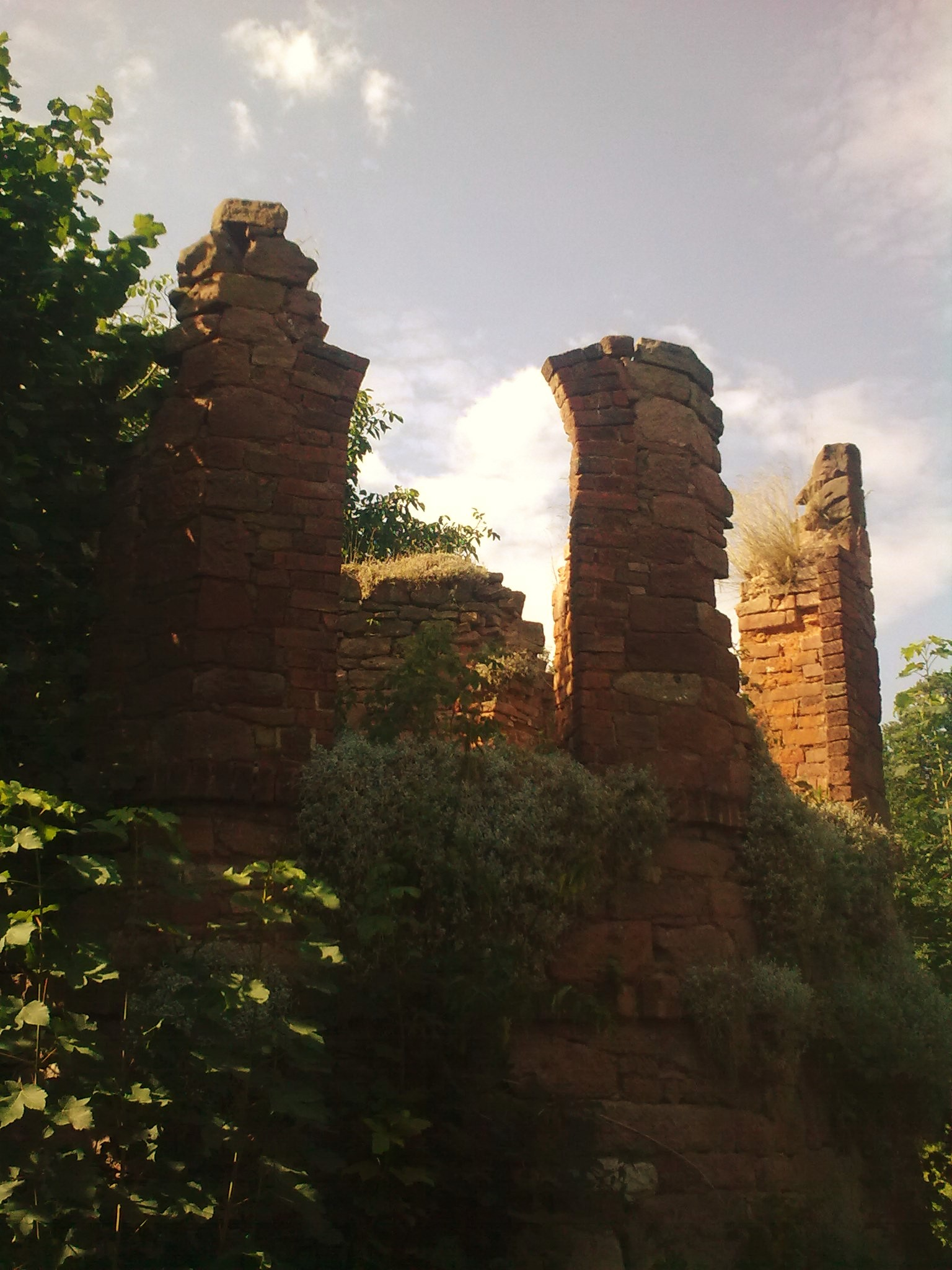
Tower remnants in the ruins of a former manor

=== Claim by Czechoslovakia ===
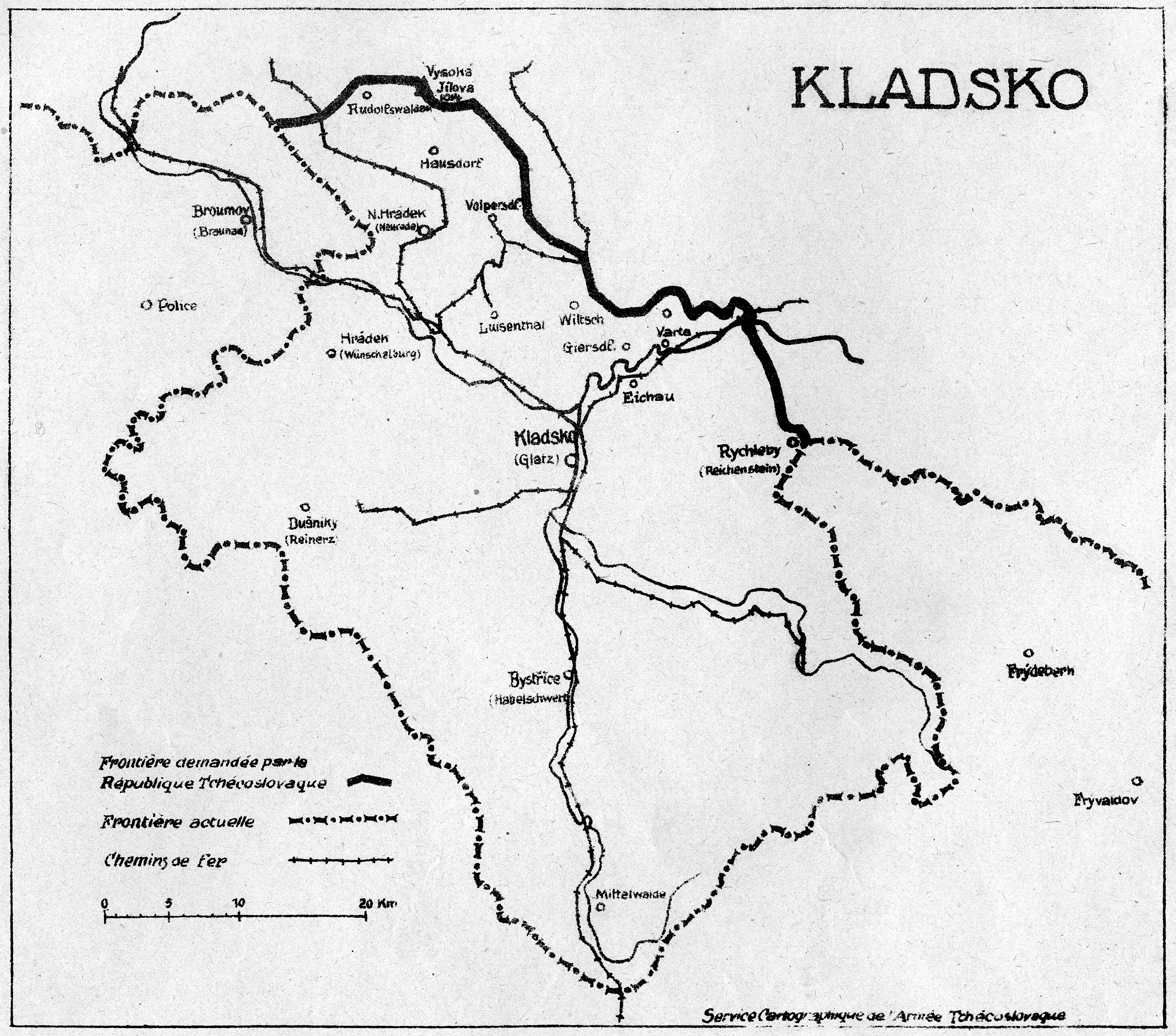
One of the proposals by the Czechoslovak delegation from the Paris Peace Conference, 1919 which would have incorporated all of Kłodzko Land, including Krajanów, into Czechoslovakia.

After World War I the new Czechoslovak state laid claim to the County of Kladsko, which included the German village of Krainsdorf in the maximalist proposal put forth by the Czechoslovak delegation. All of their claims were however ultimately rejected by the 1919 Treaty of Versailles.

=== After 1945 ===
After the capitulation of Nazi Germany in 1945, the town was placed under Polish administration according to the Potsdam Conference, and the area remains a part of Poland into the present day. The German inhabitants of the village were expelled. Czechoslovakia tried to annex the area in May 1945, wanting to incorporate the Czech population which lived in the "Czech Corner" along the southern edges of the former County of Kladsko. A land swap between Poland and Czechoslovakia for Teschen Silesia was considered, but ultimately shelved. The Czechoslovak Army had to cease military operations and withdrew from the area under pressure from the Soviet Union.

==== Góral Community ====
Whereas most of the former German and Czech settlements of Kladsko County were repopulated by Poles from regions east of the Curzon line as well as war-devastated central Poland, Krajanów was settled by a group of Górals. These Polish Highlanders from the Podhale region created a new home here as well as in the nearby villages of Czarny Bór and Borówno in Lower Silesia. While the new inhabitants initially cultivated their unique customs and folklore, these traditions have disappeared over time, and Krajanów is once again suffering depopulation.

== Home of Olga Tokarczuk ==
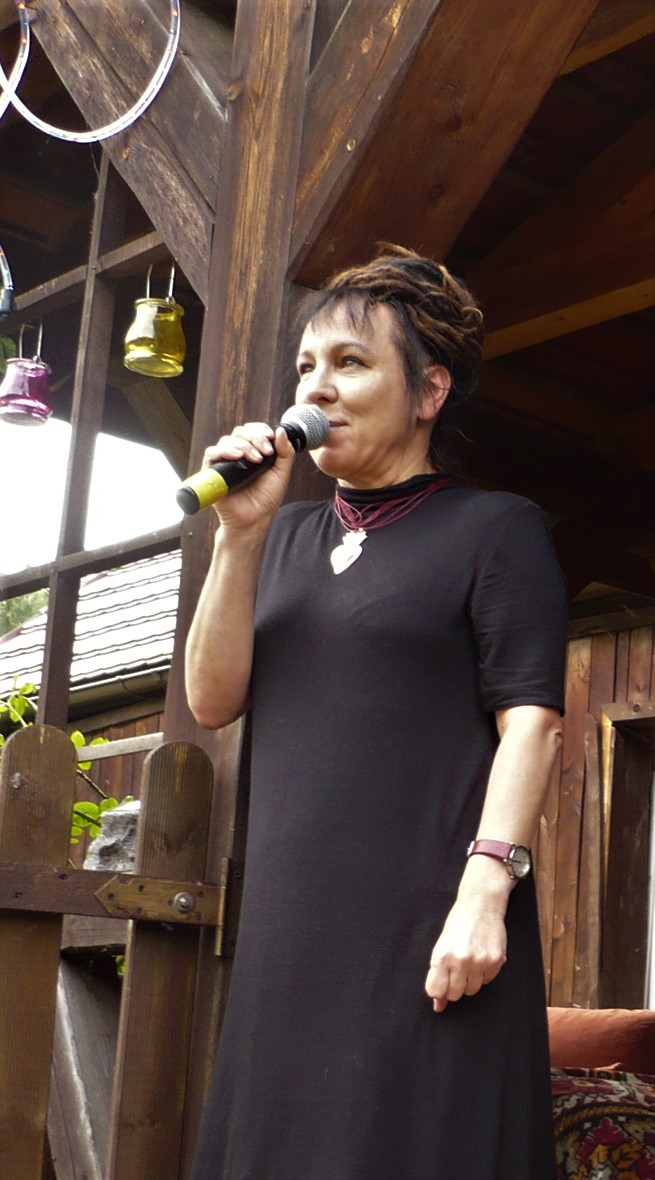
Olga Tokarczuk during the Literary Heights Festival in Krajanów

Although born in Sulechów near Zielona Góra, Nobel Prize laureate Olga Tokarczuk has lived in this village since 1998. Tokarczuk also manages her private publishing company Ruta in Krajanów.

The locale has influenced Tokarczuk's literary work. Her novel House of Day, House of Night (1998) is a patchwork of loosely connected disparate stories, sketches, and essays about life past and present in the author's adopted home located in the Sudetes in a multi-cultural borderland. While some have labeled it Tokarczuk's most "difficult" piece, at least for those unfamiliar with Central European history, it was her first book to be published in English.
