= Borówno, Lower Silesian Voivodeship =

Borówno
- Village
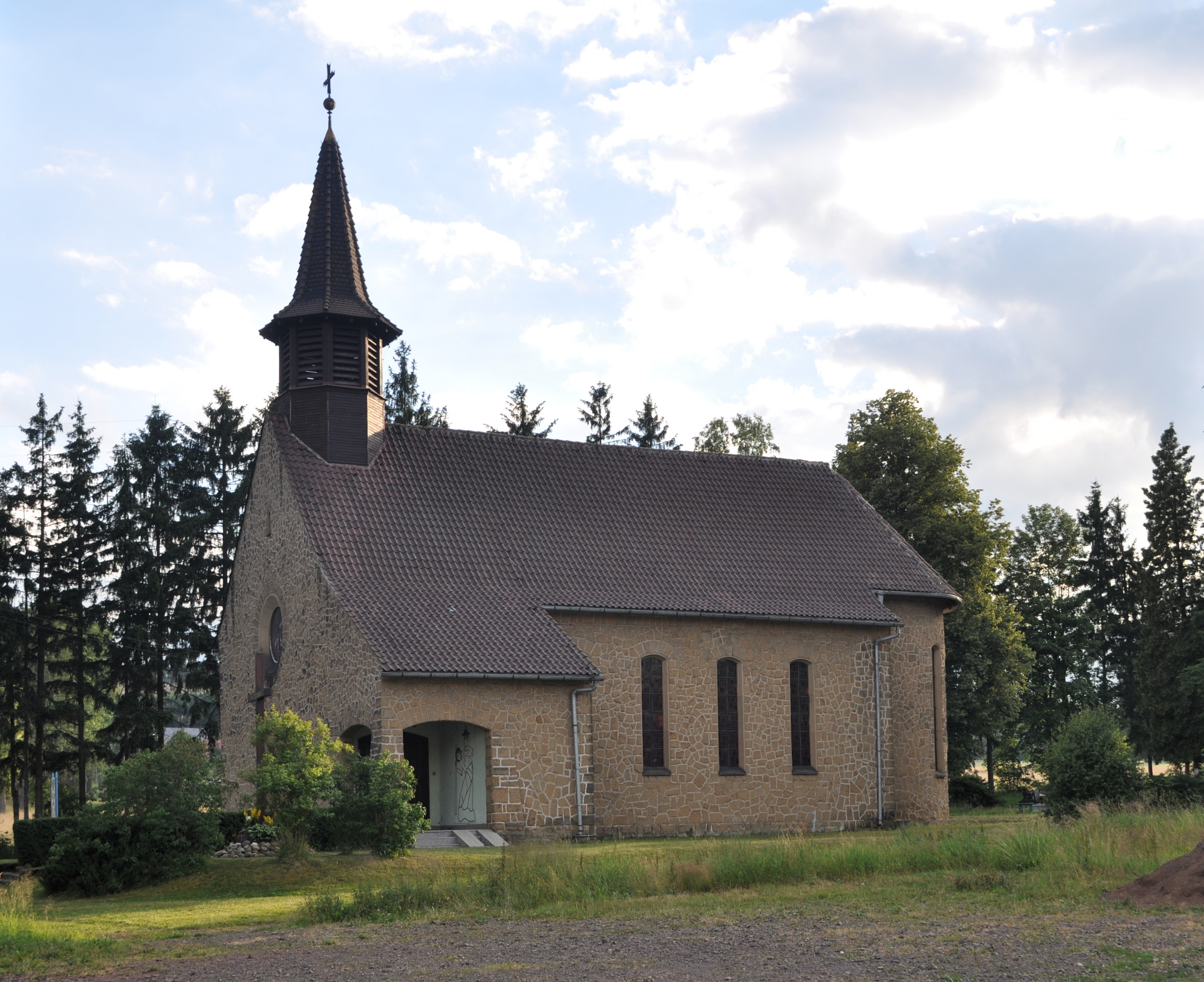
- Church in Borówno

- Location within Poland
- Coordinates: 50°46′35″N 16°05′56″E
- Country: Poland
- Voivodeship: Lower Silesian
- County: Wałbrzych
- Gmina: Czarny Bór
- Elevation: 450 m (1,480 ft)
- Population: 650

Borówno [bɔˈruvnɔ] is a village in the administrative district of Gmina Czarny Bór, within Wałbrzych County, Lower Silesian Voivodeship, in south-western Poland.

== Settlement of Polish Highlanders from Podhale ==
Whereas most of the former German and Czech settlements of Lower Silesia and the County of Kladsko were repopulated by Poles from regions east of the Curzon line and from war-devastated central Poland after World War II, Borówno and neighboring Czarny Bór were settled by a group of Górals. These Polish Highlanders from the Podhale region created a new home in this area as well as in the nearby village of Krajanów. While the new inhabitants initially cultivated their unique customs and folklore, these traditions have disappeared over time, although recently there have been efforts towards a cultural revival.

== Gallery ==
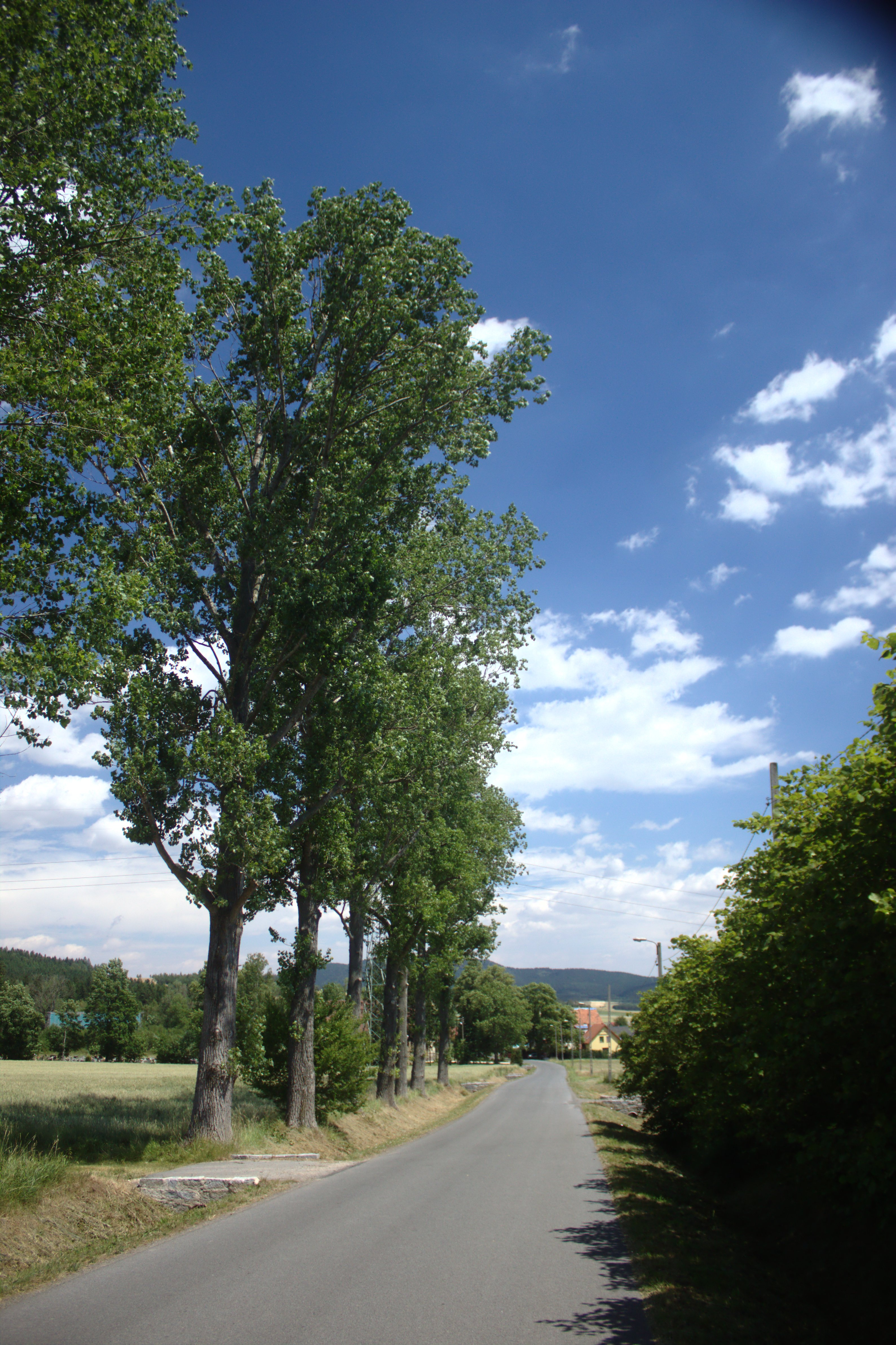
Avenue

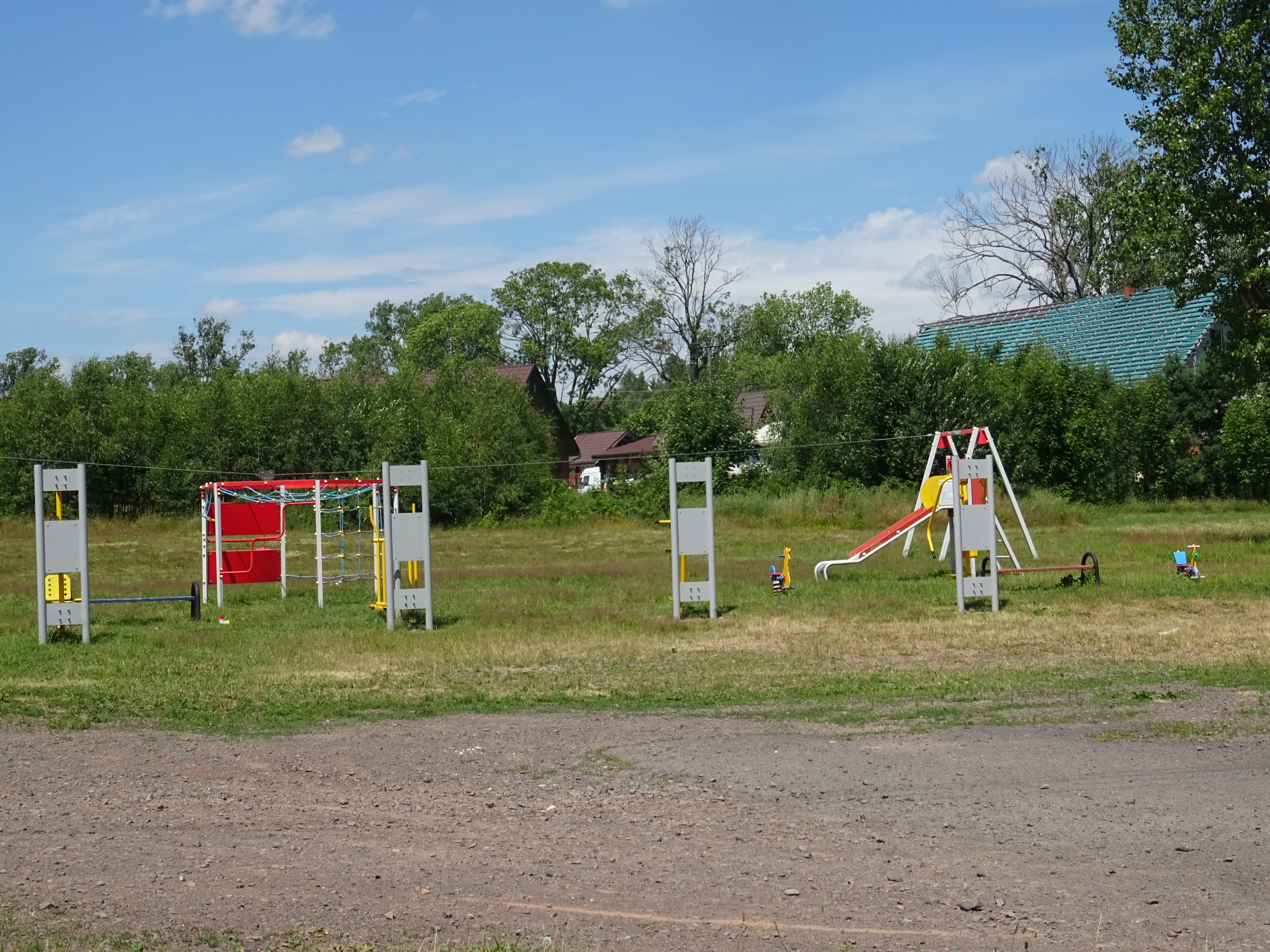
Playground

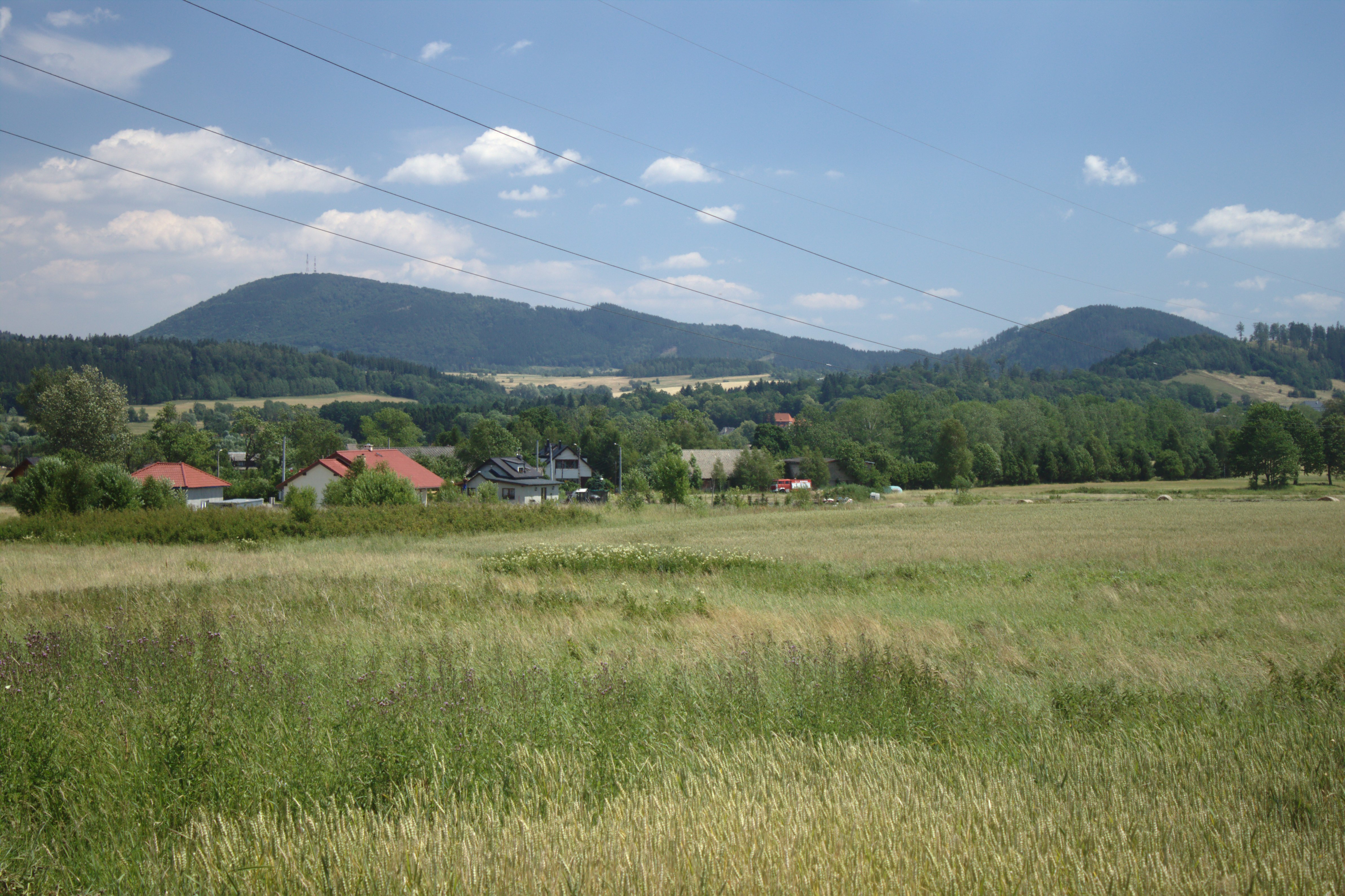
Countryside

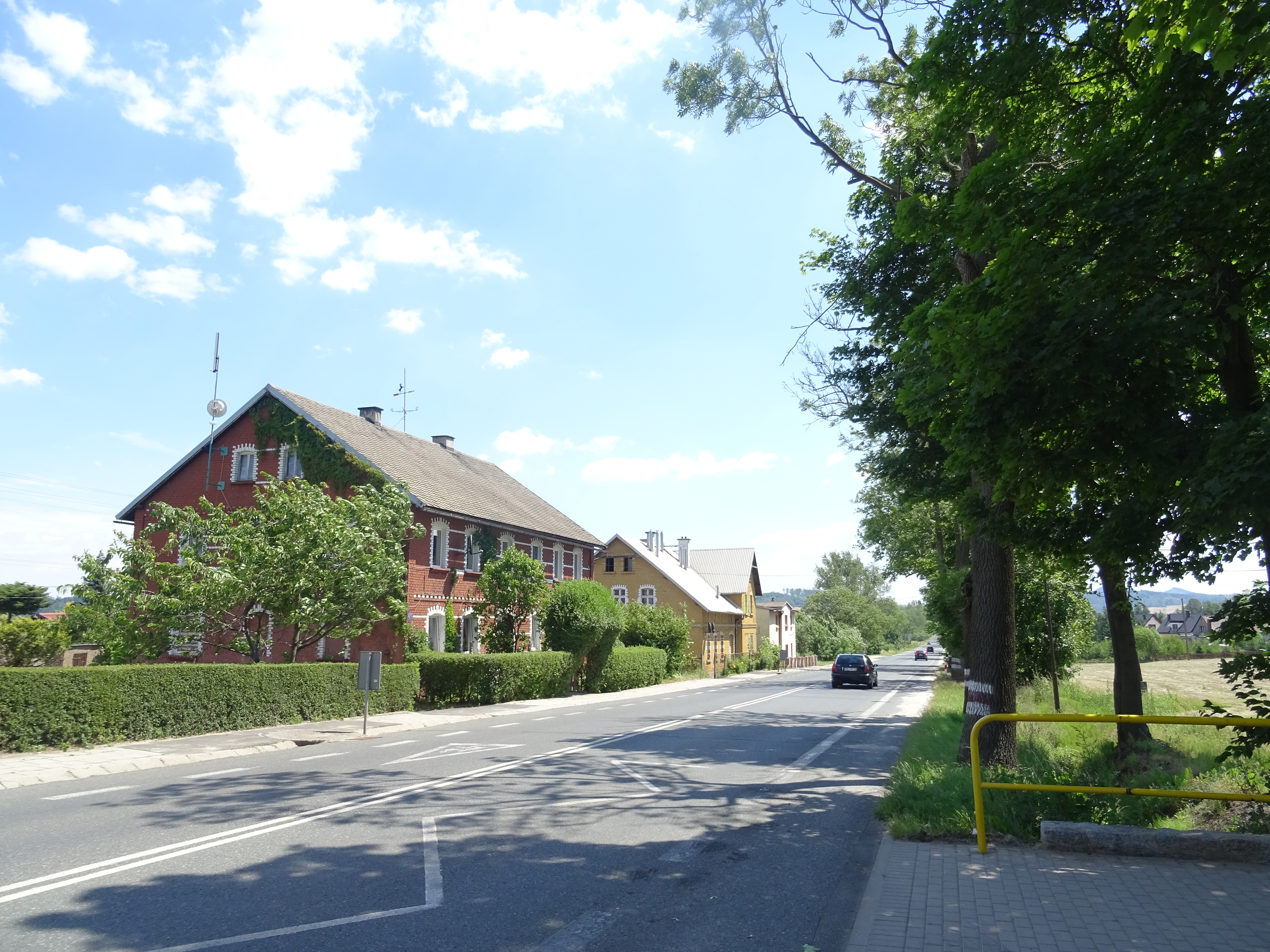
Houses by road
