= Góra Ziuty =

- Buchberg
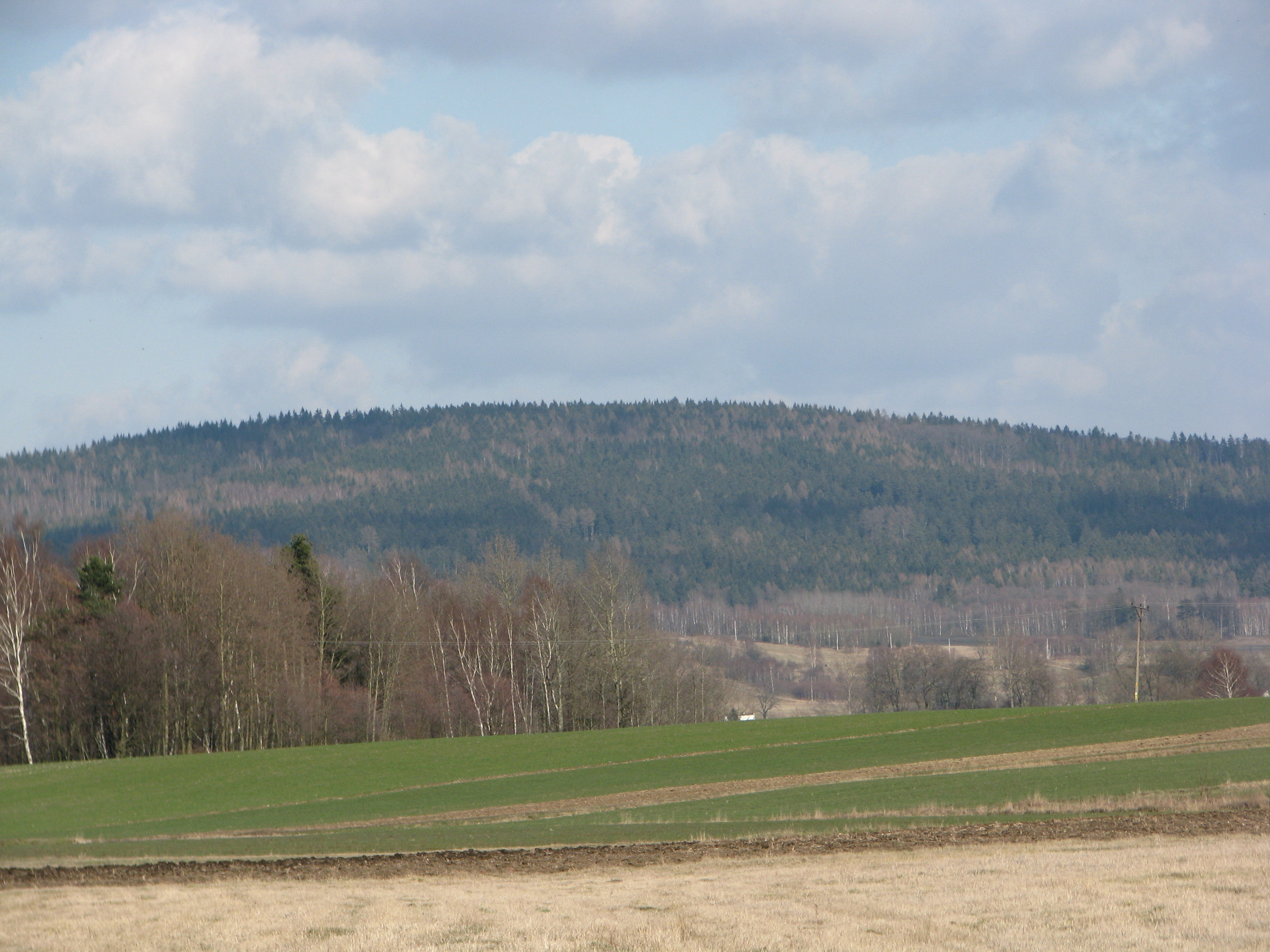
- Góra Ziuty seen from Lipienica

Highest point
- Elevation: 631 m (2,070 ft)
- Coordinates: 50°43′49″N 16°06′46″E

Geography
- Location within Poland
- Location: Poland
- Parent range: Krzeszowskie Wzgórza

Góra Ziuty [ɡura ˈʑutɨ] (lit. Ziuta's Mountain; ger. Buchberg, 631 m a.s.l.) - the highest peak of Krzeszowskie Wzgórza, within Kotlina Kamiennogórska in Central Sudetes.

== Position ==
The peak is located in the northern part of the Krzeszowskie Wzgórza. In the north east, through the Przełęcz Grzędzka it borders with Czarny Las in the Stone Mountains, in the west connects it with the Góra Świętej Anny, in the south with an unnamed spot height.

== Bibliography ==
1. Słownik geografii turystycznej Sudetów, tom 8 Kotlina Kamiennogórska, Wzgórza Bramy Lubawskiej, Zawory, red. Marek Staffa, Wydawnictwo I-BiS, Wrocław 1997, ISBN 83-85773-23-1, s. 171 i 172
2. Sudety Środkowe. Skala 1:40000. Jelenia Góra: Wydawnictwo Turystyczne Plan, 2005. ISBN 83-60044-44-9
