= Henry I of Münsterberg-Oels =

Czech prince

Henry the Elder
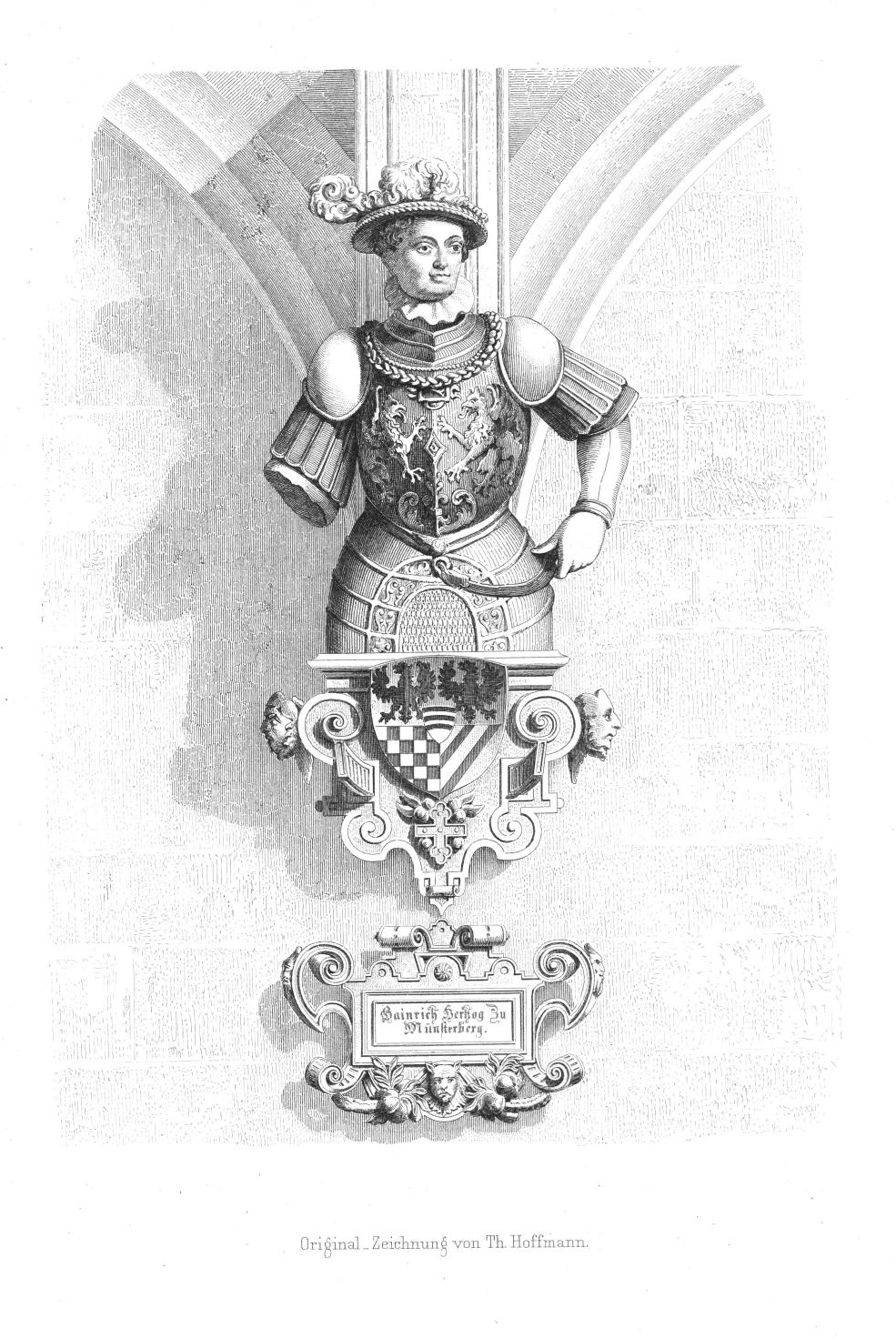
- Sculpture "Hainrich Herzog zu Muensterberg" at the Neues Lusthaus (Ducal pleasure house) in Stuttgart, built 1584-1593 by Georg Beer.

Duke of Münsterberg-Oels
- Reign: 1472–1498
- Successor: Albert I

Count of Kladsko
- Reign: 1472-1498
- Born: 1448
- Died: 1498 (aged 49–50); Kłodzko
- Burial: Franciscan monastery of St. George in Kladsko
- Spouse: Ursula of Brandenburg
- Issue: Albert I George I John; Margaret; Charles I Louis; Magdalena; Sidonie
- House: Podiebrad
- Father: George of Poděbrady
- Mother: Kunigunde of Sternberg

Henry the Elder of Münsterberg (also called Henry I of Münsterberg, Henry I of Oels; Czech: Jindřich starší z Minstrberka or Jindřich starší z Poděbrad; German: Heinrich der Ältere von Münsterberg or Heinrich I. von Oels; 1448 – 1498, Kłodzko) was an Imperial Count and Count of Kladsko. He was also Duke of Silesian duchies Münsterberg and Oels and 1465–1472 Duke of Opava. At times, he served as the Landeshauptmann and governor of Bohemia.

== Family background ==
Henry was descended from the Poděbrady branch of the Kunštát family. His parents were King George of Poděbrady of Bohemia and Kunigunde of Sternberg. In order of siblings Henry was the third son after the older brothers Boček and Victor.

== Life ==
Henry was initially planned by his father, George of Poděbrady, to be his successor. As early as 1459 Emperor Frederick III appointed Henry's older brother Victor as an imperial count. On 7 December 1462 the Emperor appointed Henry and his younger half-brother of the same name, Henry the Younger, as imperial counts. At the same time, the Emperor confirmed the appointment by King George in 1459 of Victor, Henry the Elder and Henry the Younger as dukes of Münsterberg and counts of Kladsko. After their father also acquired the Duchy of Opava in 1464, he gave this duchy in 1465 to his sons Henry the Elder, Victor and Henry the Younger. Although Henry and his brothers adhered to the Catholic faith, the Pope refused to recognize their royal titles because the Ban imposed on George of Poděbrady should also apply to his sons.

After King George's death on 22 March 1471, Henry was appointed as supreme governor of the Kingdom of Bohemia until the arrival of the new king. In this position, on 10 August 1471 he received in Kladsko the newly elected King Vladislas II of Bohemia, who was on his way from Kraków to Prague for the coronation. Later, Henry the Elder was appointed Governor for a period of absence of the king.

King George's possessions were divided among his sons according to the inheritance plan in 1472. Henry the Elder received the County of Kladsko, the Silesian Duchy of Münsterberg (including Frankenstein and the East Bohemian dominions of Náchod), Vízmburk Castle, Kunětická hora Castle and the lands of the now defunct monasteries of Opatovice and Sezemice that had been devastated in the Hussite Wars. King Vladislas confirmed him in these possessions on 3 and 29 April 1472. After the emperor had confirmed the privileges for the vassalage of the county of Kladsko, he asked his subjects in Kladsko to pay homage to Duke Henry. The estates of the county paid homage to the new Duke at his castle in Kladsko.

As the first count of Kladsko, Heinrich resided with his family at Kladsko Castle, where his court was located. At first, the office of Landeshauptmann was held by Hans of Warnsdorf, who had been appointed by George of Poděbrady. He was succeeded by in 1474 by Hans of Bernstein, who was in turn succeeded by Hans Pannwitz of Rengersdorf in 1477. His marshalls were, in order, Jan Horušovsky of Roztok, Jan Fulstein of Slavkov and Zbyněk of Buchov. His comptroller was George of Bischofsheim; Court Chancellor was Kliment of Jakšonov. Although Henry himself had an excellent knowledge of the German language, most of the documents produced in his office were written in Czech.

At the request of the Abbot Peter of Broumov, Heinrich the Elder's troops entered the city of Broumov on 24 April 1472 without a fight. The city had been occupied by captain Franz von Hag of the Bohemian counter-king Matthias Corvinus in 1469, and the Hungarian soldiers still were in the city. Thus, Henry acquired Broumov and the surrounding land. He ruled it until 1483 and then incorporated it into the county of Kladsko, with the consent of king Vladislas II. Hans of Warnsdorf went on making incursions against Silesia, at Henry's request. Because of the associated threats, some Silesian towns voluntarily paid war funds and contributions to Duke Henry.

On 9 January 1473 the Pope lifted the interdict imposed on George of Poděbrady and his sons, and gave them absolution. That same year, Henry and his brothers Victor and Henry the Younger tried to resolve their dispute about the Crown of Saint Wenceslas. To this end, they invited representatives of Bohemia, Poland, Silesia and Lausitz to participate in negotiations in Opava, which were held by Victor. Although the negotiations were not successful, King Vladislas promised to erase the brothers' debts. To this end, taxes would be levied. In a dispute in 1473 between the county's Free Judges and the cities of Kladsko, Bystrzyca Kłodzka, Radków and Lądek-Zdrój about the brewing right, Henry decided in favor of the cities.

In 1477 Henry annexed the barony of Homole, which hitherto had belonged to the Bohemian circle of Hradec Králové, to the County of Kladsko. He also enlarged Homole with the parishes of Lewin and Czermna and the villages of Słone and Brzozowie. On 13 November of that year, Vladislas II confirmed the continuing validity of Henry's possession of the Kunětice Mountain Castle and the former monastic estates of Opatovice and Sezemice, and three days later he gave Henry Frankenstein as a hereditary fief.

In 1477, Henry participated in the peace negotiations between Bohemia and Silesia in Broumov as a representative of Vladislas II, together with William Krušina of Lichtenburg (as governor of Hradec Králové), Peter Kdulinec, Christoph von Talkenberg auf Talkenstein and Hans of Warnsdorf. The negotiations did not produce a lasting peace. On 3 July 1479, Henry welcomed the anti-king Matthias Corvinus of Poland in Olomouc, on behalf of king Vladislas II of Bohemia.

Before 1491, Henry the Elder received Litice Castle from his eldest brother Boček. In 1492, a dispute arose between Henry and King Vladislas over the rule of the baronies of Poděbrady and Kostomlaty. The king had claimed these lands for himself after the death of Henry the Younger, although Henry's testament had awarded them to Henry the Elder. The dispute was settled after the Oels branch of the Piast family died out in the male line in 1495. Henry had to give up Poděbrady and, in a treaty concluded on 28 April 1495 in Bautzen which also applied to Henry's sons, he received the Duchy of Oels as a hereditary fief, except the Free Estates of Milicz, Żmigród and Syców, which had been split off from Oels in 1492. Also in 1495, Henry had to sell Litice and other East Bohemian lands to the High Steward of Bohemia, William II of Pernstein, to pay the debts he had incurred during his participation in the war against Matthias Corvinus. In earlier years, Henry had already been forced by his creditors to sell off most of the former monastery villages. In 1497, he finally had to pledge the large barony of Náchod to Jan Špetle z Prudic a ze Žlebů. Henry died a year later, and his sons failed to pay off the loan, so they had to sell Náchod to Jan Špetle. After they sold the County of Kladsko in 1501, his descendants were left with only his Silesian possessions. Henry died in 1498 and was buried in the church of the Franciscan monastery of St. George which he had founded in Kladsko. In 1558 he and eight of his relatives who had also been buried there, were reburied in the main church in Kladsko.

== Marriage and issue ==
In 1467 Henry married in Cheb (German: Eger) with Ursula of Brandenburg, a daughter of the Elector Albert III Achilles of Brandenburg. The marriage produced eight children:

1. Albert (1468–1511), Duke of Münsterberg-Oels, married in 1487 Princess Salome (1475/76-1514), daughter of Duke John II of Żagań and Großgloga
2. George (1470–1502), Duke of Münsterberg-Oels, married in 1488 Princess Jadwiga (1476–1524), also a daughter of John II of Żagań
3. John (23 June 1472 – 7 August 1472)
4. Margaret (1473–1530), married in 1494 Prince Ernest of Anhalt-Dessau
5. Charles (1476–1536) married in 1488 Princess Anna (1480/83-1541), also a daughter of John II of Żagań
6. Louis (21 June 1479 – 27 April 1480)
7. Magdalena (25 January 1482 – 11 April 1513)
8. Sidonie (Czech: Zdeňka) (3 June 1483 – 1522), married in 1515 Ulrich of Hardegg

Through Henry's mediation his surviving sons Albert, George and Charles married in 1487 and 1488 with three daughters of Duke John II of Sagan and Großglogau. As Duke of Münsterberg, Henry founded the Silesian branch of the House of Poděbrady, which became extinct in the male line in 1647.

With the marriage of his sister Ludmila with Frederick I of Liegnitz on 7 September 1474 Henry increased the family connections with the House of Piast. His elder Brother Victor, Duke of Münsterberg had expanded the Piast family greatly with the intermarriage with the Piasts.

For Poland the Piast female line inheritance was formally accepted in the Radomsk declaration of 27 November 1382, on behalf of the 'lords and the whole community' of Wielkopolska. The House already practicing a loose approach in this matter, solidified the stance of the House law of chosen succession. Therefore, the Dukes of Münsterberg were considered legally as Piasts.

Henry and his wife Ursula were generous sponsors of monasteries. In 1475 they founded the Franciscan Monastery of St. George in Kladsko, which became the home monastery of her family. In 1494 they gave half of the village Polanica to the Augustinian canons in Kladsko.
