= Ulrich of Hardegg =

Austrian nobleman (d. 1535)

- Born: after 1483
- Died: 1535
- Noble family: Prüschenk
- Spouse: Sidonie of Münsterberg-Oels
- Father: Henry of Hardegg
- Mother: Elisabeth of Rosenberg

Ulrich of Hardegg (German: Ulrich von Hardegg or Ulrich von Hardeck or Ulrich zu Hardegg auf Glatz und im Marchlande; after 1483 – 1535) was an Austrian nobleman from the Prüschenk family of Count of Hardegg. He was "Cup-bearer" of Austria, which, by this time, was a title of nobility and no longer involved looking after the arch-duke's wine cellar. He was also steward in Styria.

== Origin and family ==
Ulrich's father, Count Henry of Hardegg (formerly: Henry Prüschenk, Baron zu Stettenberg; German: Heinrich Prüschenk, Freiherr zu Stettenberg; died: 1513) served in the imperial army, and was temporarily Imperial Captain in Italy. Since 1495, he held the title of Count of Hardegg, and in 1499 he was elevated to the imperial count as Count Hardegg and in the Marches (German: Graf zu Hardegg und im Marchlande). Ulrich's mother was Elizabeth (b. 1466), a daughter of the Bohemian noble and Governor of Silesia John II of Rosenberg. Ulrich had two brothers: Julius I (d. 1557) and John (d. 1539?).

In 1515 Ulrich married Sidonie (Czech: Zdeňka), the youngest daughter of Henry I, Duke of Münsterberg-Oels and granddaughter of King George of Poděbrady of Bohemia.

== Life ==
In 1501 Ulrich bought for 70000Rhenish guilders the County of Glatz from his future brothers-in-law Albert I, George I and Charles I which at the time was an immediate fief of Bohemia. It had been raised to county status by George of Poděbrady, with the intention that it would serve as a territory for his descendants. George's son Henry the Elder had lived on Glatz Castle as the first Count of Glatz. At his death, however, he left huge debts to his sons and they saw themselves forced to sell the county to Ulrich.

On behalf of the peasants, the Knights Hans von Pannwitz, Melchior Donig, Georg von Bischofsheim and Heinrich von Kauffung agreed to the sale, as did the Estates of Glatz. The Free Judges personally paid hommage to Ulrich. Henry the Elder's widow, Ursula of Brandenburg, who had received the county as her dower on the occasion of her marriage, also agreed. In return, Ulrich confirmed the former privileges of the nobility of Glatz and the royal cities. Thereafter, Ulrich lived in Glatz. He donated a baptismal font, with his coat of arms, to the church in Glatz.

In 1507 Emperor Maximilian I, in his capacity as king of Bohemia, granted Ulrich the right to mint money. Beside the county's coat of arms, the Hardegg family crest was embossed into coins minted at the Mint at Glatz. During his reign, a meeting of the general diet of the Lands of the Bohemian Crown was held in Glatz in 1512. At this meeting, the authorities decided to fight against robber barons. Ulrich also possessed the mining rights in his county. In 1524, he issued new mining regulations.

On 29 December 1524, Ulrich sold the county to his brother John of Hardegg. John lived mostly on Greinburg Castle in the Lower Mühlviertel area of Upper Austria.
