= Czerep =

- Todtenkopf
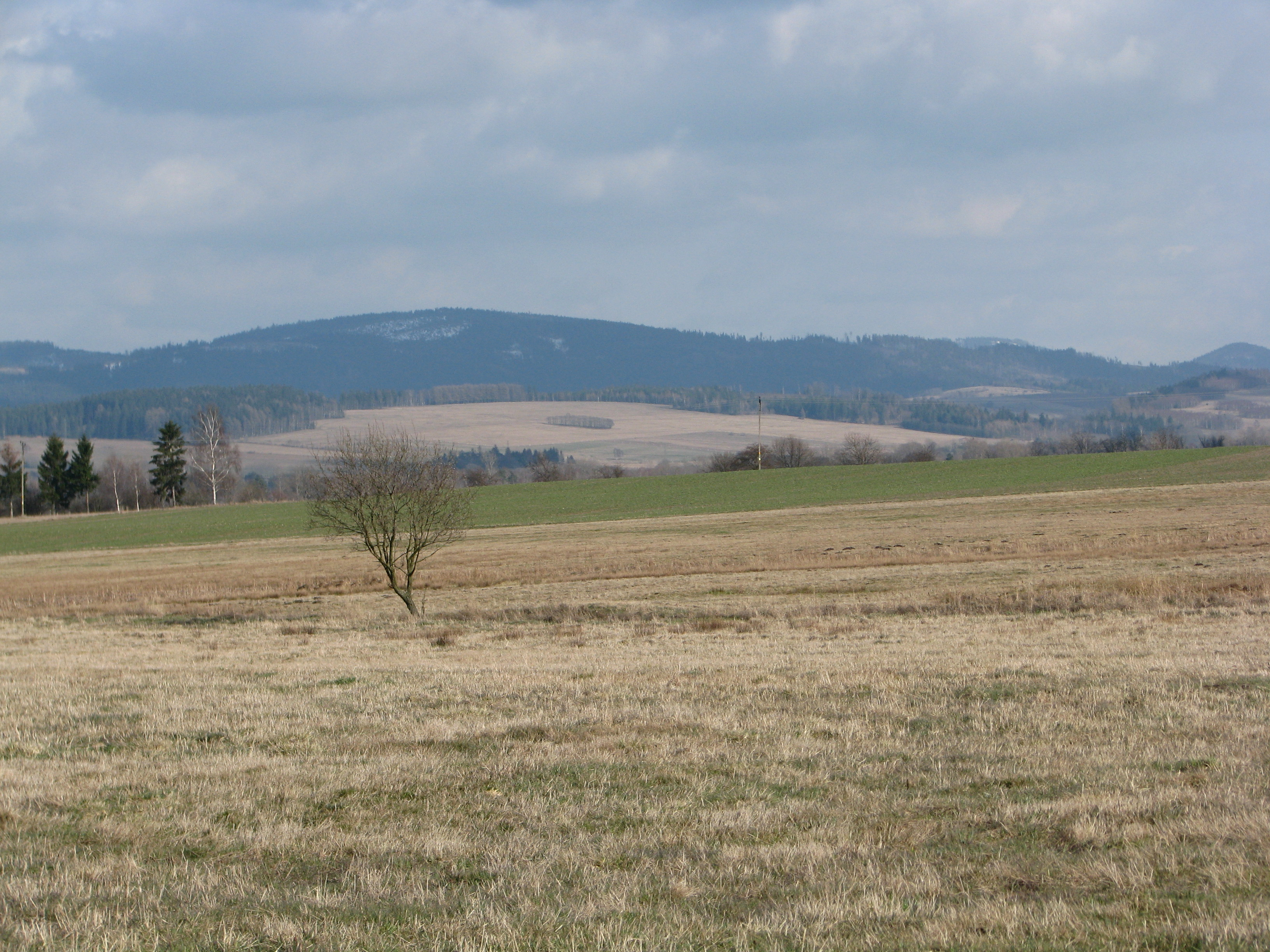
- Czerep seen from Lipienica

Highest point
- Elevation: 581 m (1,906 ft)
- Coordinates: 50°42′20″N 16°07′56″E

Geography
- Location within Poland
- Location: Poland
- Parent range: Krzeszowskie Wzgórza

Czerep [tʂɛrɛp] (ger. Todten Kopf, Todtenkopf, 581 m a.s.l.) is a hill in the southern part of the Krzeszowskie Wzgórza, within Kotlina Kamiennogórska, in Central Sudetes.

== Position ==
The peak is located in the southern part of the Krzeszowskie Wzgórza; it is their southern tip. In the north, through Przełęcz Żłób it connects to the Post Berg. Southern slopes steeply fall into the stream Kochanówka that separates Krzeszowskie Wzgórza of Zawory Mountains.

== The geologic structure ==
It is made from Credaceus sandstones glauconite and mudstones.

== Vegetation ==
The apex as well as the majority of hill are covered with a pine forest, down, east and west sides feature meadows.

== Bibliography ==
- Słownik geografii turystycznej Sudetów, tom 8 Kotlina Kamiennogórska, Wzgórza Bramy Lubawskiej, Zawory, red. Marek Staffa, Wydawnictwo I-BiS, Wrocław 1997, ISBN 83-85773-23-1, s. 89 i 90
- Sudety Środkowe. Skala 1:40000. Jelenia Góra: Wydawnictwo Turystyczne Plan, 2005. ISBN 83-60044-44-9.
