= Czarny Bór =

- Village
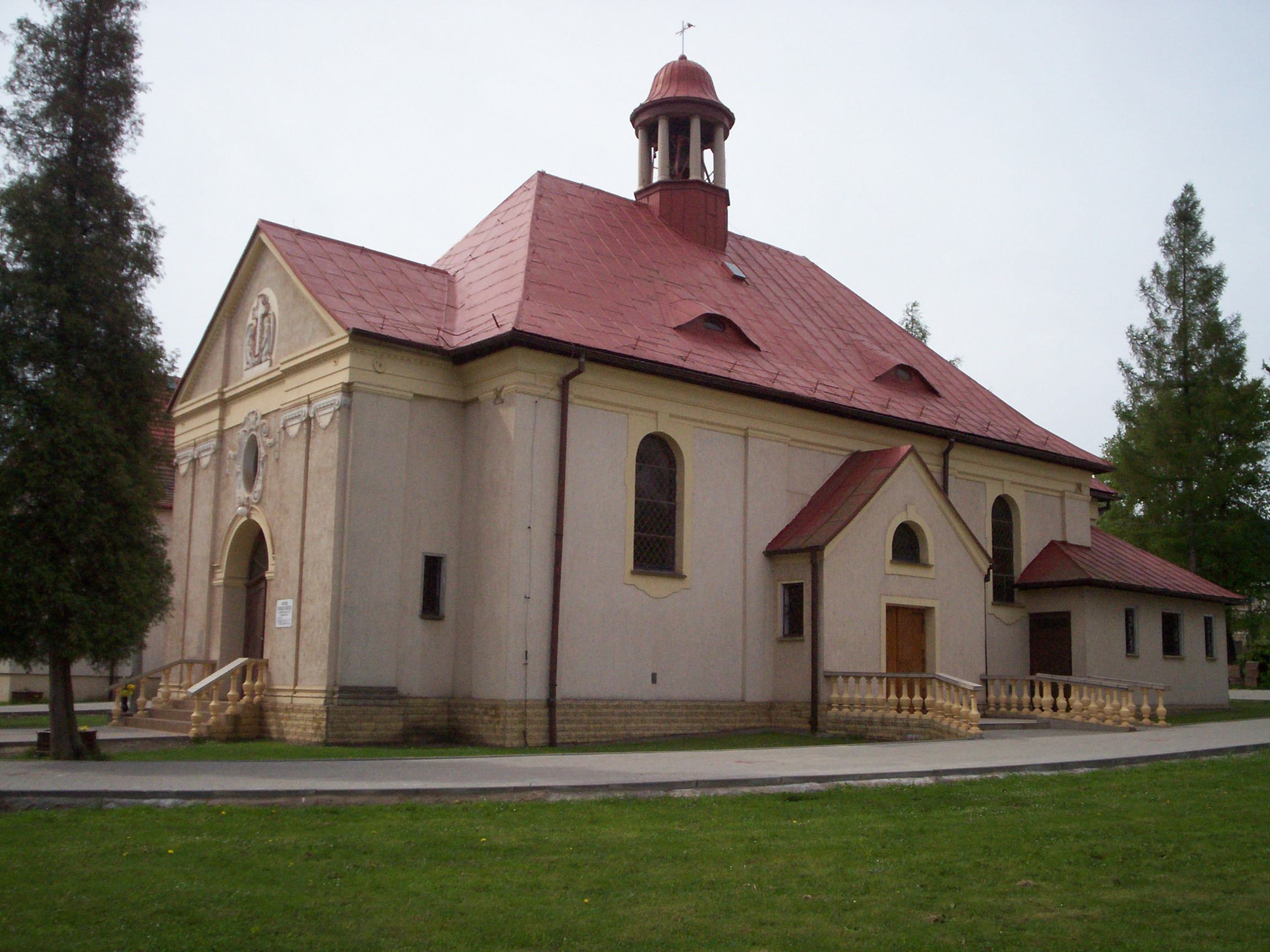
- Church of the Sacred Heart of Jesus

- Location within Poland
- Coordinates: 50°46′N 16°8′E
- Country: Poland
- Voivodeship: Lower Silesian
- County: Wałbrzych
- Gmina: Czarny Bór

Population
  - Total: 2,000

Czarny Bór (Polish: [ˈt͡ʂarnɨ ˈbur], German: Schwarzwaldau) is a village in Wałbrzych County, Lower Silesian Voivodeship, located in the south-western Poland. It serves as the seat of Gmina Czarny Bór, an administrative district (gmina). The village lies approximately 11 km (7 mi) west of Wałbrzych and 76 km (47 mi) south-west of Wrocław, the regional capital.

== Settlement of Gorals from Podhale ==
Whereas most of the former German and Czech settlements of Lower Silesia and the County of Kladsko were repopulated by Poles from regions east of the Curzon line and from war-devastated central Poland after World War II, Czarny Bór and nearby Borówno were settled by a group of Gorals. These Gorals from the Podhale region created a new home here as well as in the nearby village of Krajanów. While the new inhabitants initially cultivated their unique customs and folklore, these traditions have disappeared over time, although recently there have been efforts towards a cultural revival.

== Notable residents ==
- Norbert Kuchinke (1940–2013), German journalist and actor
- Karl Abraham Zedlitz (1731-1793), Prussian minister of education
