= Albert I of Münsterberg-Oels =

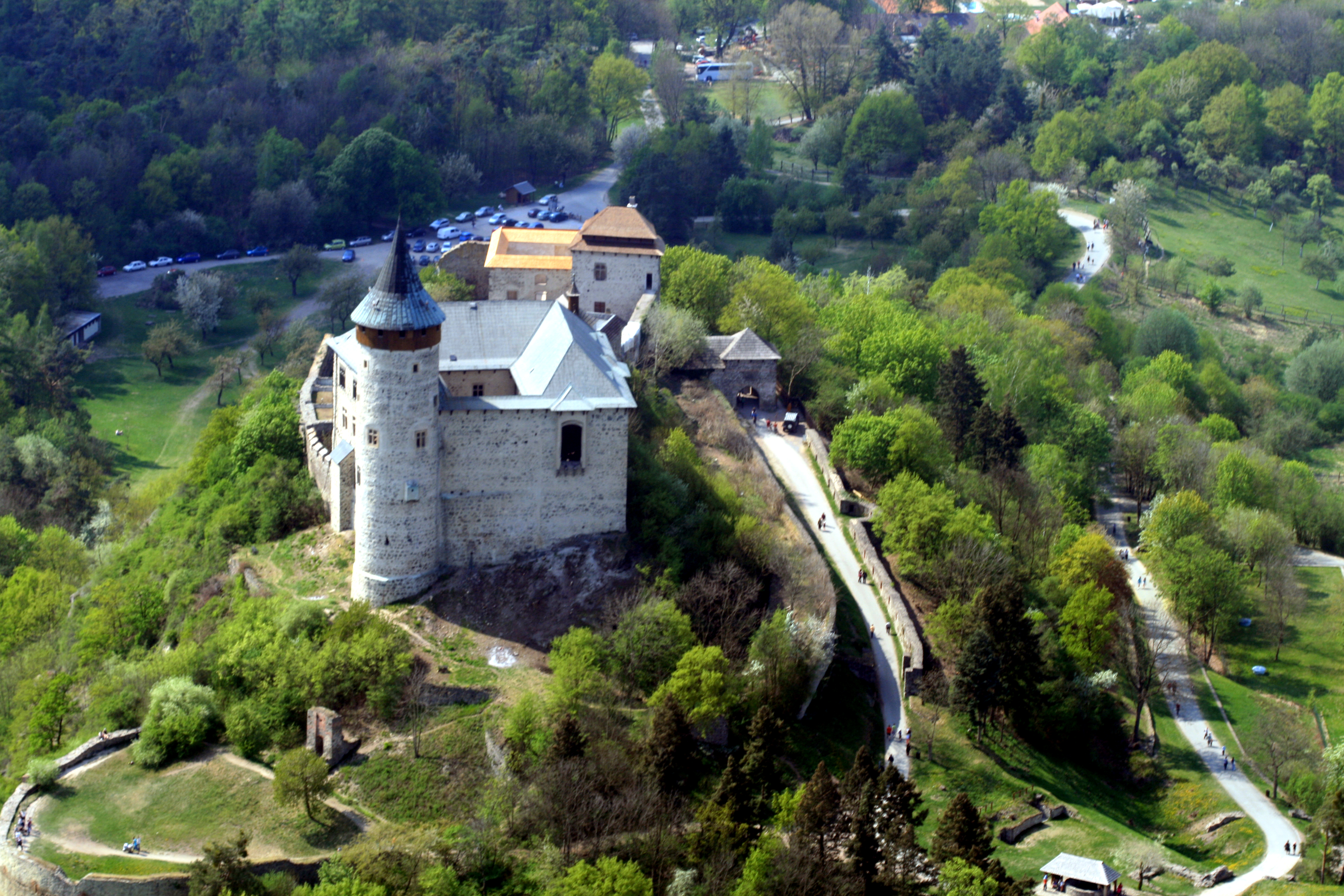
- Born: 3 August 1468; Kunětická hora Castle
- Died: 12 July 1511 (aged 42); Prostějov
- Noble family: House of Poděbrady
- Spouse: Salome of Żagań
- Father: Henry the Elder of Münsterberg
- Mother: Ursula of Brandenburg

Albert I of Münsterberg-Oels (German: Albrecht I. von Münsterberg or Albrecht von Podiebrad; Czech: Albrecht z Minstrberka or Albrecht z Poděbrad; 3 August 1468 – 12 July 1511) was a member of the House of Poděbrady and a Duke of the Silesian duchies of Münsterberg and Oleśnica and Count of Kladsko.

== Life ==
Albert was a grandson of the King George of Poděbrady of Bohemia. His parents were Henry the Elder of Münsterberg and Ursula of Brandenburg, daughter of the Elector Albrecht III Achilles, Elector of Brandenburg.

In 1487, Albert married Salome (1475/76-1514), a daughter of Duke John II of Żagań and Großglogau. In 1488, his younger brothers George and Charles also married daughters of John II.

After their father's death in 1498, the three brothers Albert, George and Charles ruled jointly at first, though each lived at his own court: Albert in Kłodzko, Georg in Oleśnica, Charles in Münsterberg and after 1530 in his newly built castle in Frankenstein. The three brothers sold the County of Kladsko in 1501 to their future brother-in-law Ulrich of Hardegg. However, they retained the title of "Count of Kladsko" for themselves and their descendants, until the male line of Münsterberg branch of the House of Poděbrady died out in 1647.

Albrecht and Salome had a daughter Ursula (1498–1545). In 1517, she married Henry Riesenberg (Czech: Jindřich z Švihovský Ryzmberka), who died in 1551.
