= George I of Münsterberg =

- Born: 2 October 1470; Litice Castle
- Died: 10 November 1502 (aged 32); Oleśnica
- Noble family: House of Poděbrady
- Spouse: Hedwig of Sagan
- Father: Henry I, Duke of Münsterberg-Oels
- Mother: Ursula of Brandenburg

George I of Münsterberg (also: George I of Poděbrady; German: Georg I. von Münsterberg-Oels or Georg I. von Podiebrad; Czech: Jiří z Minstrberka or Jiří z Poděbrad; 2 October 1470, Litice Castle – 10 November 1502, Oleśnica) was a member of the House of Poděbrady, Duke of the Silesian Duchies of Münsterberg and Oels and Count of Glatz.

== Life ==
George was a grandson of the King George of Poděbrady of Bohemia. His parents were Duke Henry the Elder of Munsterberg-Oels and Ursula of Brandenburg, daughter of the Elector Albert III Achilles of Brandenburg.

George's brother Albert married in 1487 to a daughter of the Duke John II "the Mad" of Żagań. In 1488, George himself and his brother Charles I also married with daughters of John II. George's wife was Hedwig (1476–1524).

After their father's death in 1498, the three brothers Albert, George and Charles ruled jointly at first, but each lived on his own castle: Albert in Kłodzko, George in Oleśnica (German: Oels) and Charles in Ziębice (German: Münsterberg) and from 1530 in his newly built castle in Ząbkowice Śląskie (German: Frankenstein). Although the three brothers had sold the County of Glatz (Polish: Kłodzko) in 1501 to their future brother-in-law Ulrich of Hardegg, they retained the title of Counts of Glatz for themselves and their descendants until the Münsterberg line of the Poděbrady branch of the Kunštát family died out in the male line in 1647.

George was a patron of the spa facilities of Lądek-Zdrój (German: Bad Landeck). Soon after his father's death, he started the construction of the local "George Bath" with a residential house and the St. George's Chapel. In 1501 he issued the first bath regulations for Landeck.
