= Gmina Czarny Bór =

Gmina Czarny Bór Czarny Bór Commune
- Gmina
- Flag Coat of arms
- Interactive map of Gmina Czarny Bór
- Coordinates (Czarny Bór): 50°46′N 16°8′E
- Country: Poland
- Voivodeship: Lower Silesian
- County: Wałbrzych
- Seat: Czarny Bór
- Sołectwos: Borówno, Czarny Bór, Grzędy, Grzędy Górne, Jaczków, Witków

Area
  - Total: 66.31 km^{2} (25.60 sq mi)

Population (2019-06-30)
  - Total: 4,864
  - Density: 73.35/km^{2} (190.0/sq mi)
- Website: https://www.czarny-bor.pl

Gmina Czarny Bór is a rural gmina (administrative district) in Wałbrzych County, Lower Silesian Voivodeship, in south-western Poland. Its seat is the village of Czarny Bór, which lies approximately 11 kilometres (7 mi) west of Wałbrzych, and 76 kilometres (47 mi) south-west of the regional capital Wrocław.

The gmina covers an area of 66.31 square kilometres (25.6 sq mi), and as of 2019 its total population is 4,864.

== Neighbouring gminas ==
Gmina Czarny Bór is bordered by the town of Boguszów-Gorce and the gminas of Kamienna Góra, Marciszów, Mieroszów and Stare Bogaczowice.

== Villages ==
The gmina contains the villages of Borówno, Czarny Bór, Grzędy, Grzędy Górne, Jaczków and Witków.

== Twin towns – sister cities ==
Gmina Czarny Bór is twinned with:

- Grand-Champ, France
- Nechanice, Czech Republic
- Vilnius District Municipality, Lithuania
