= Jaczków =

- Village
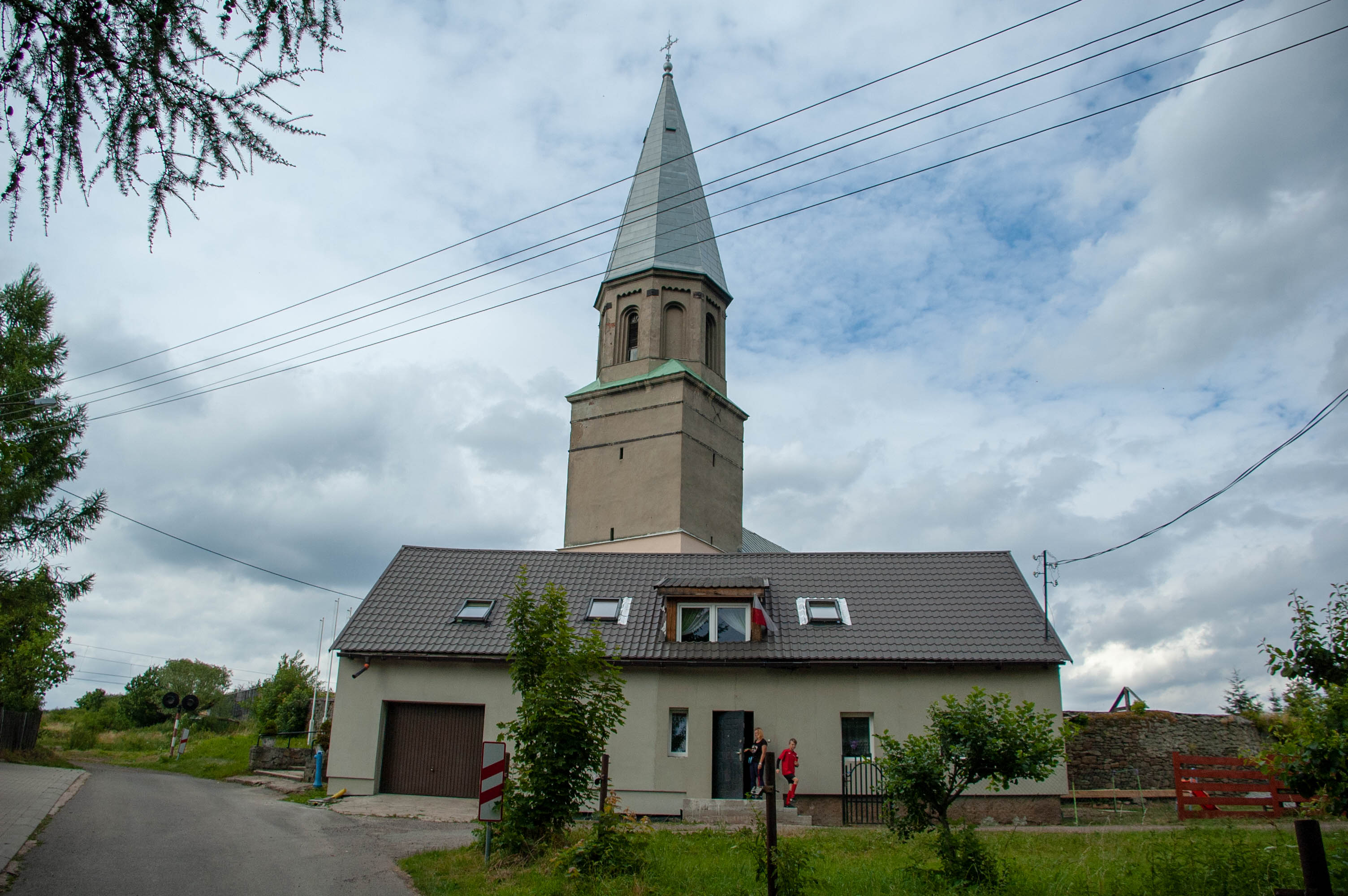
- Our Lady of Cestochowa church

- Location within Poland
- Coordinates: 50°48′27″N 16°05′47″E
- Country: Poland
- Voivodeship: Lower Silesian
- County: Wałbrzych
- Gmina: Czarny Bór

Jaczków [ˈjat͡ʂkuf] a village in Poland located in Lower Silesian Voivodeship, in Wałbrzych County, in the Gmina of Czarny Bór. The village is situated on the river Leske, in a valley located between the massif Trójgarbu and Krąglaka the north and the rocky mountains in the south.

== Demography ==
The village has about 489 inhabitants. Although the land in the village and municipality is primarily assigned for agriculture, agriculture accounts for just 20% of employment within the population. Most people work in industry and services in nearby Kamienna Góra and Walbrzych. The unemployment rate remains relatively high at around 25-30%.

== Economy ==
In the village there are two small shops, a sawmill, workshop and several car transport companies.

== Transportation ==
The village is situated on a rail route linking Jelenia Gora Wałbrzych and Wrocław. Currently this line is in a bad condition. Travel from Wroclaw to Witków nearby (97 km) takes around 2 1/2 hours. Also, a network of municipal and county roads located within the miejscwości are in a bad state of repair. In the years 2009-2012 it was intended to express the construction of roads Szczecin - Lubawka to beja near fluent Jaczków (just above the road linking Gostków to Jaczków). For the purpose of road construction S3 plan to tunnel under the eastern part of the Massif Krąglaka, at the outlet location to which the emergence of the so-called travel service. ILO Jaczków, then the path will go right behind the village, where more than 300-meter valley Lesku wharf. In the period 2010-2013 is planned construction of sanitary sewers and the construction of the reservoir on the river przeciwpowodziowego Leska.

== Administration ==
In the years 1975-1998, the town administratively belonged to the Wałbrzyskiego province.

== Notable residents ==
- Ernst Christoph von Nassau (1686—1755), Prussian general
- Kazimierz Lipień - Polish wrestler
- Joseph Lipień - Polish wrestler

== Gallery ==
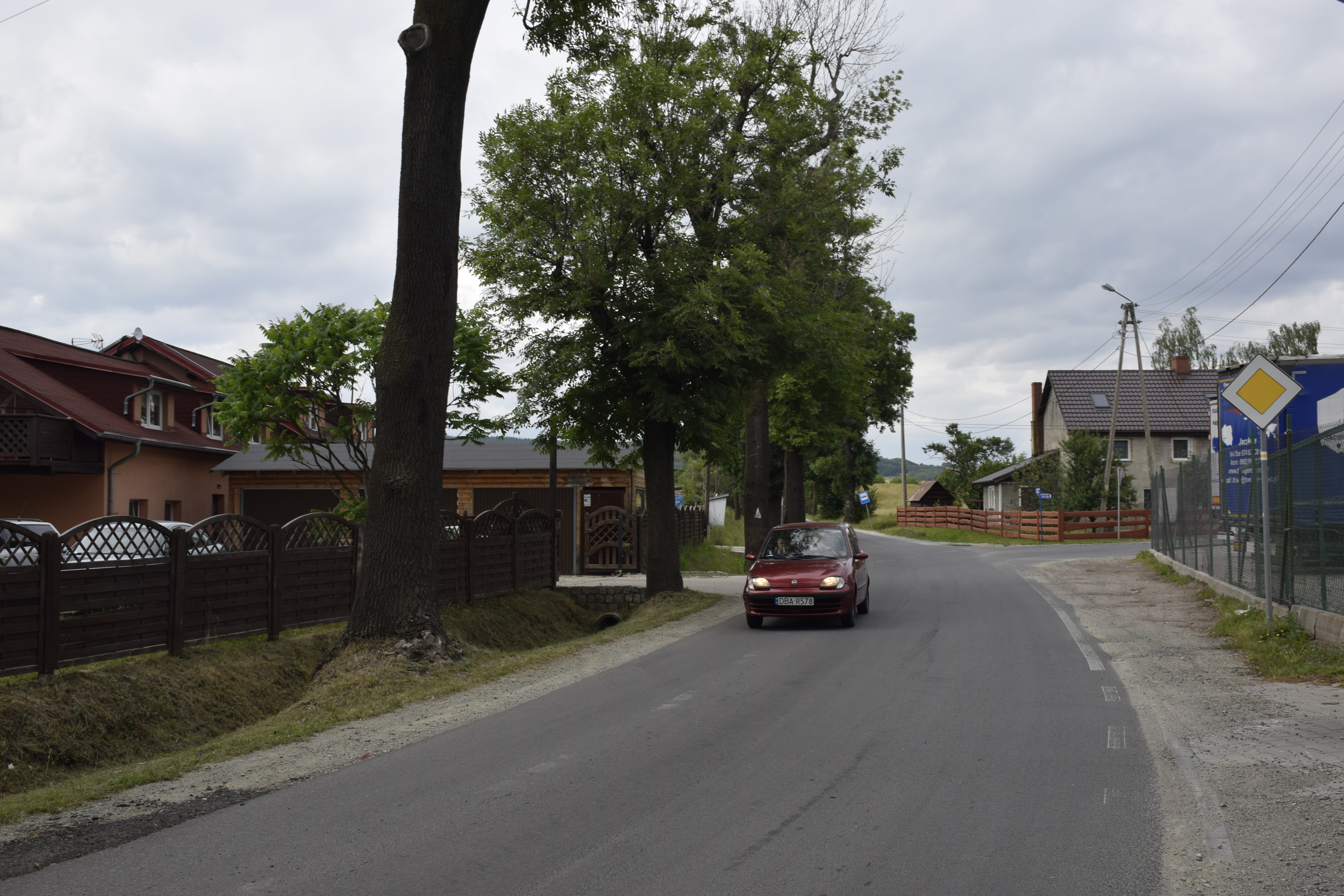
Street with a car

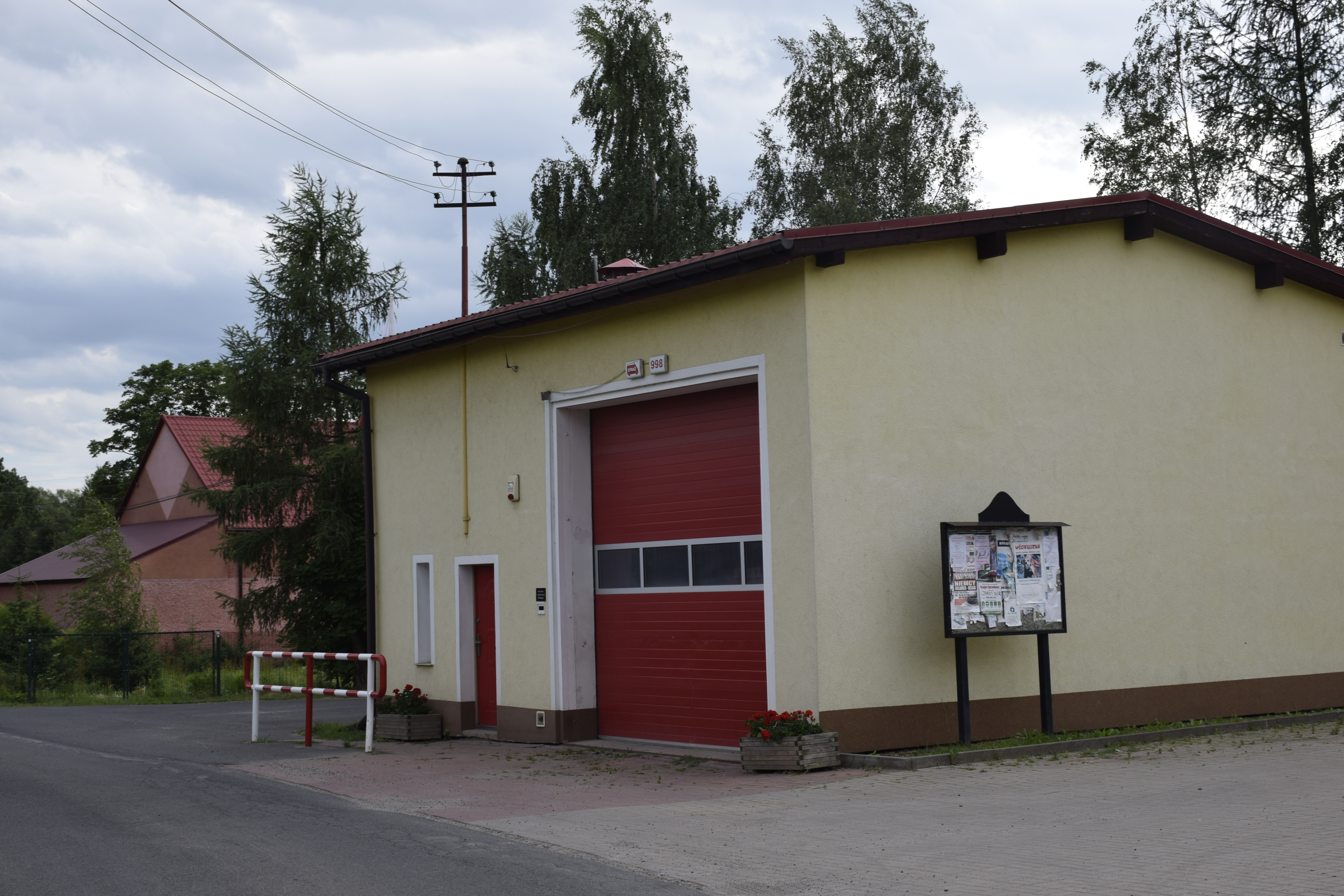
Fire station

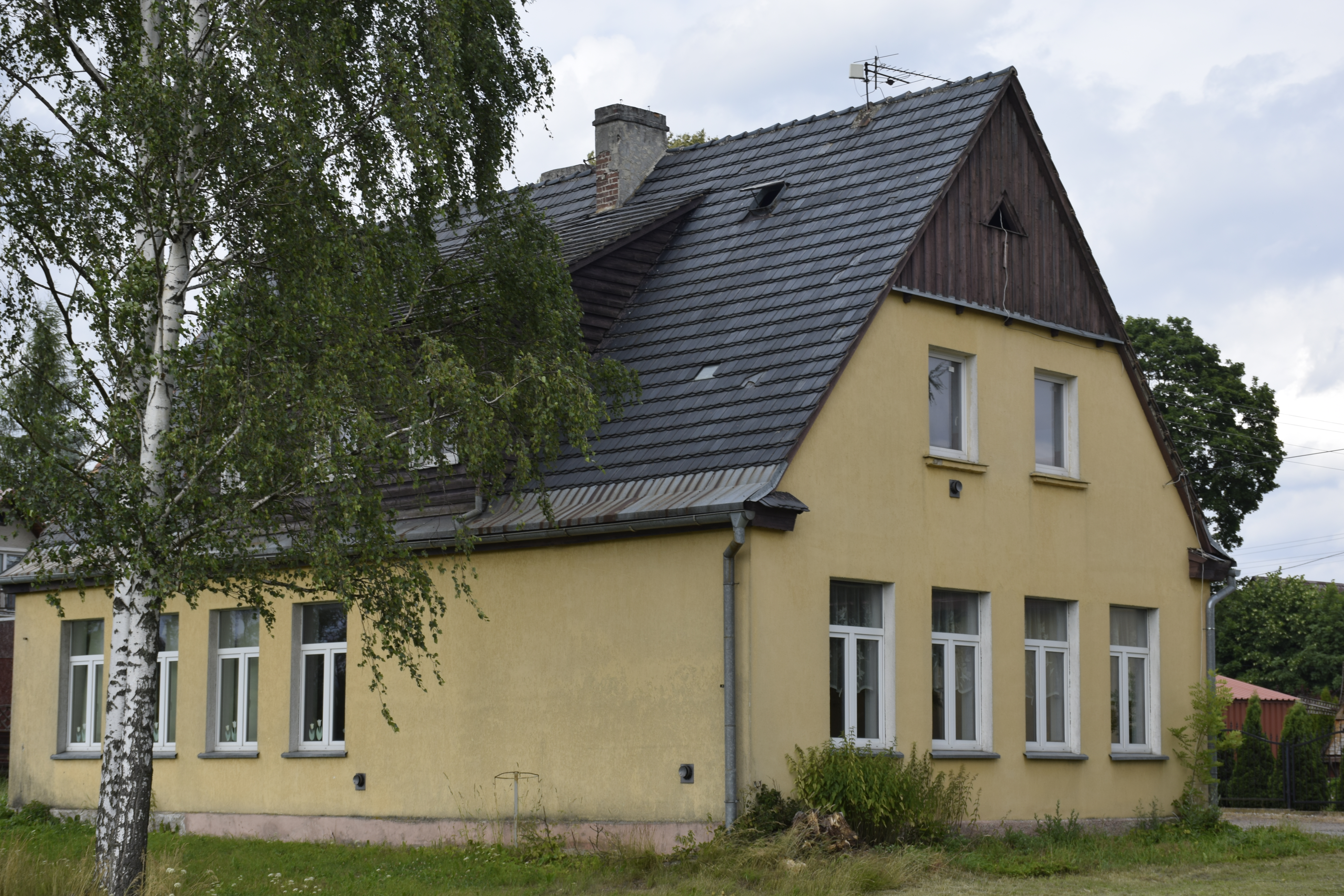
House
