= Ursula of Brandenburg, Duchess of Münsterberg-Oels =

Ursula of Brandenburg
- Born: 25 September 1450
- Died: 25 November 1508 (aged 58); Breslau
- Noble family: House of Hohenzollern
- Spouse: Henry the Elder of Munsterberg-Oels
- Father: Albrecht III Achilles, Elector of Brandenburg
- Mother: Margarete of Baden

Ursula of Brandenburg (25 September 1450 – 25 November 1508) was a princess of Brandenburg by birth and by marriage Duchess of Münsterberg and Oels and Countess of Glatz.

== Life ==
Ursula was the eldest child of the Elector Albrecht Achilles of Brandenburg (1414–1486) from his first marriage to Margarete of Baden (1431–1457). The princess was considered a favorite child of her father and one of the most prominent victims of the marriage of convenience in the 15th century. First, she had been promised to Duke Albert the Brave of Saxony. When he broke off the engagement, she was passed on to his older brother, Ernest. When this engagement was also dissolved, the next marriage candidate was Duke Henry the Elder of Münsterberg-Oels (1448–1498), son of the Bohemian king George of Poděbrady. In 1466 Pope Paul II disapproved of the engagement as a "blasphemous connection with a heretic", and Ursula and her father were excommunicated. The relations between Brandenburg and Emperor Frederick III also worsened due to the engagement. George of Poděbrady and Abrecht Achilles created a defensive alliance against all the opponents of the marriage.

Without telling her father, Ursula secretly became engaged to Count Rudolph III of Sulz, Landgrave in Klettgau. The pope dissolved this engagement, and she eventually married in Cheb (German: Eger), on 9 February 1467, Duke Henry the Elder of Münsterberg. The ban imposed on Ursula and her father was lifted in 1471.

== Issue ==
From her marriage to Henry of Münsterberg, Ursula had the following children:

- Albert (3 August 1468 – 12 July 1511), Duke of Münsterberg-Oels

married in 1487 Princess Salome (1475/76-1514), daughter of Duke John II of Żagań and Großglogau

- George (2 October 1470 – 10 November 1502), Duke of Münsterberg-Oels

married in 1488 Princess Jadwiga (1476–1524), also a daughter of John II of Żagań

- John (23 June 1472 – 7 August 1472)
- Margaret (25 August 1473 – 28 June 1530)

married in 1494 Prince Ernest of Anhalt-Dessau

- Charles (2/4 May 1476 – 31 May 1536)

married in 1488 Princess Anna (1480/83-1541), also a daughter of John II of Żagań

- Louis (21 June 1479 – 27 April 1480)
- Magdalena (25 January 1482 – 11 April 1513)
- Sidonie (Czech: Zdeňka) (3 June 1483 – 1522), married in 1515 to Ulrich of Hardegg
