= Hans of Warnsdorf =

Hans of Warnsdorf (German: Hans Wölfel von Warnsdorf or Johann von Warnsdorf or Hanusch von Warnsdorf; Czech: Jan z Varnsdorfu or Hanuš Welf z Warnsdorfu; died: after 1489) was a follower of King George of Poděbrady of Bohemia. From 1454 to 1474, he held the post of Landeshauptmann of Kłodzko; and from 1465 also the post of governor of Ząbkowice Śląskie (German: Frankenstein).

== Life ==
Hans was a member of a North Bohemian family of knights. In 1440, he acquired Žacléř Castle, from where he raided the Silesian cities, until the Silesians captured the castle. In 1441, Queen Barbara of Cilli of Bohemia pledged her Wittum, the Lordship of Trutnov, not far from Žacléř Castle, to him.

In 1454, George of Poděbrady in his capacity as guardian of King Ladislaus Posthumus of Bohemia, who was still a minor, appointed Hans as Landeshauptmann of the County of Kłodzko. In the same year, George also enfeoffed Žacléř Castle to Hans as an inheritable fief, after enfeoffing Trutnov to him for life, a year earlier.

As governor of Kłodzko, Hans of Warnsdorf earned the full confidence of George of Poděbrady, who was elected King of Bohemia in 1458. From 1465, he was also governor of neighbouring Ząbkowice Śląskie (German: Frankenstein). Already in March 1458, Hans of Warnsdorf represented George of Poděbrady in a meeting of Silesian dukes in Legnica. This meeting primarily dealt with the recognition of George as King; the cities of Wrocław and Świdnica were against recognition. Agreement could not be reached and, since the Silesian dukes were still at war with the heretic King George, Hans of Warnsdorf's soldiers began looting and pillaging villages in the Diocese of Wrocław. After he continued this campaign, this Silesians gave in and paid homage to King George in Legnica.

In 1462, King George sent Hans of Warnsdorf to Vienna, where he is said to have freed Emperor Frederick III, who was besieged in his residence by rebellious subjects. As governor of Kłodzko, Hans of Warnsdorf's main concern was to keep the clergy of Kłodzko outside the conflict between the Catholic Church and the Utraquists. This is probably the reason why Provost Michael Czacheritz made him a member of the fraternity of the Canons Regular at Kłodzko.

George of Poděbrady died in 1471. Hans of Warnsdorf, however, kept his post as governor of Kłodzko and Ząbkowice Śląskie until 1474. On 24 April 1472, Hans of Warnsdorf and George's son Count Henry the Elder jointly occupied the city of Broumov without a fight. Broumov had been occupied in 1469 by mercenaries led by Franz von Hag, a captain of the Bohemian counter-king Matthias Corvinus. The mercenaries were still present in Broumov. Immediately after their success at Broumov, Hans and Henry occupied the nearby town of Police nad Metují. This brought Broumov and Police nad Metují under the reign of Henry the Elder, who incorporated them, with permission of King Vladislav II of Bohemia into his County of Kłodzko. From his base in Broumov, Hans undertook more raids into Silesia. To counter the threat of more raids, some Silesian cities voluntarily agreed to pay tribute to Count Henry the Elder of Kłodzko.

In 1477, Hans of Warnsdorf, together with Henry the Elder and the Bohemian noblemen William Krušina of Lichtenburg, Peter Kdulinec of Ostroměř and Christopher of Talkenberg at Talkenstein, participated in the peace talks between Bohemia and Silesia at Broumov as representatives of Vladislav II. Hans of Warnsdorf acted here as first representative of Bohemia. In the same year, King Vladislav II transferred the Silesian town of Kamienna Góra to Hans of Warnsdorf and his son-in-law Frederick of Schönburg. In 1482, Duke Henry the Elder pledged the East Bohemian possession Vízmburk Castle (German: Wiesenburg) to Hans, but he repaid the loan three years later.

Hans von Warnsdorf was married to Euphemia, whose last name is not known. They probably had no male offspring. His daughter Catherine was married to Frederick of Schönburg (died: after 1492), who was governor of Hradec Králové District. In 1471, Hans of Warnsdorf transferred the fief of Žacléř Castle to him, and in 1472 the Lordship of Trutnov.

== References and sources ==
- Friedrich Bernau: Hans „Wölfel“ von Warnsdorf – bedeutendendster mittelalterlicher Gebieter von Schatzlar, in: Schatzlar und seine Bezirksgemeinden, Marburg an der Lahn, 1993, p. 96–98
- Karl Prätorius: Vergleichende Zeittafel Böhmen–Trautenau–Schatzlar, in: Schatzlar und seine Bezirksgemeinden, Marburg an der Lahn, 1993, p. 617–653
- Joachim Bahlcke et al.: Handbuch der historischen Stätten: Böhmen und Mähren, Kröner-Verlag, Stuttgart, 1998, ISBN 3-520-32901-8, pp. 544, 619
- Martin Šandera: Jindřich I. Minsterberkský – První hrabě Kladský a jeho majetková základna, in: Kladský Sborník, vol. 6, 2004, pp. 7–19
