= Góra Świętej Anny (Krzeszowskie Wzgórza) =

Mountain in Poland

Mount Saint Anne
- Annaberg
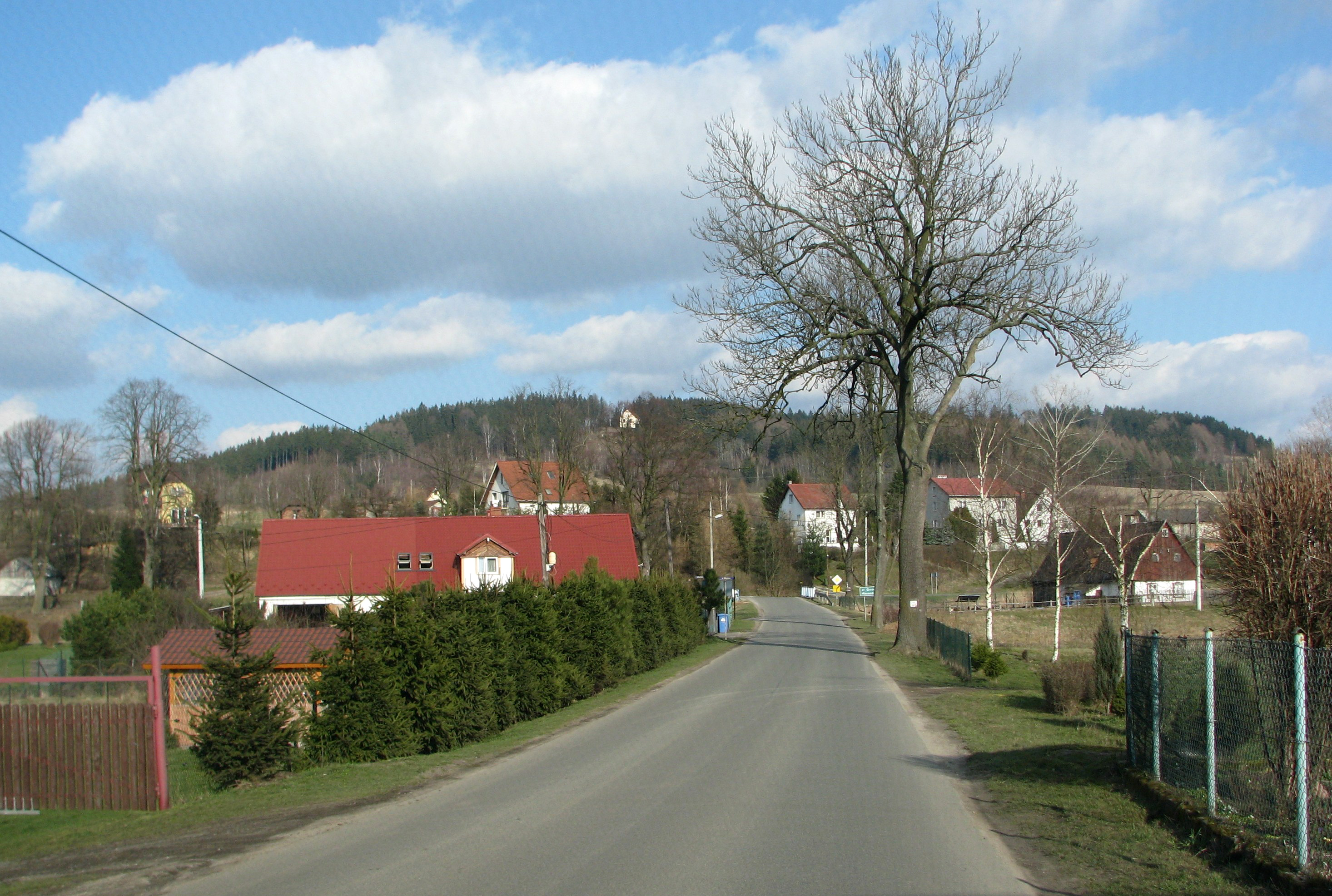
- Góra Świętej Anny seen from Krzeszów

Highest point
- Elevation: 593 m (1,946 ft)
- Coordinates: 50°44′02″N 16°05′33″E

Geography
- Location within Poland
- Location: Poland
- Parent range: Krzeszowskie Wzgórza

Mount Saint Anne (Polish: Góra Świętej Anny (Krzeszowskie Wzgórza) [ˈɡura ɕviɛ̃tɛj annɨ]; German: Annen Berg, Annaberg) – peak 593 m a.s.l. is a mountain in Poland. located in north-west part of Krzeszowskie Wzgórza, near Kamiengorian Valley (pl. Kotlina Kamiennogórska), in Central Sudetes (pl. Sudety Środkowe).

== Geology ==
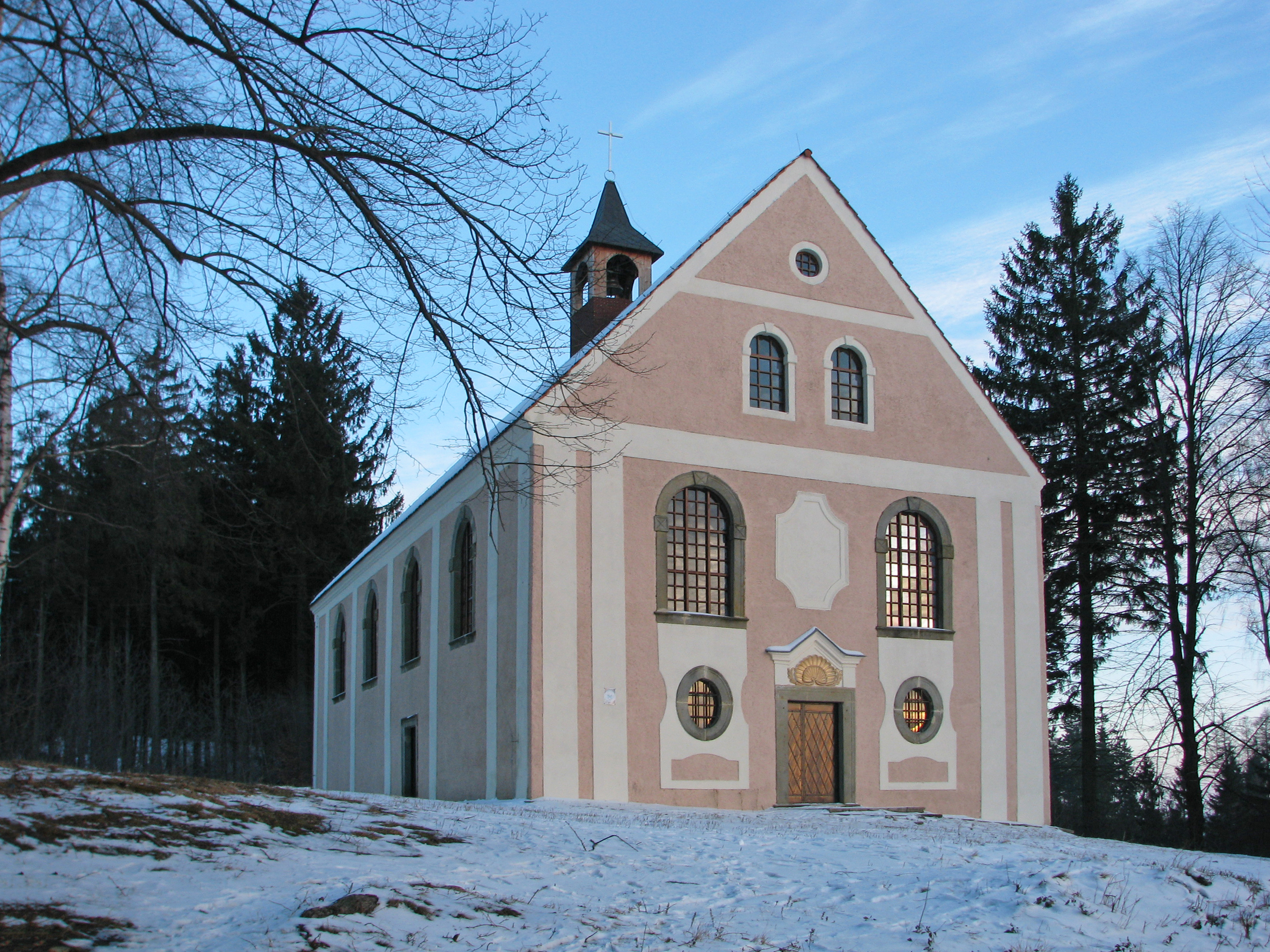
Chapel of Saint Anne

The summits are made up of old, upper cretaceous sandstone, glauconite and mud stones. The western part of the mountain is next to Krzeszów.

== Vegetation ==
The apex, as well as the majority of bands are covered with pine forest. The western part of the mountain is covered with plains.

== Chapel of Saint Anne ==
Below the summit, on the western side the mountain lies a baroque chapel of St. Anna dating to 1623. The chapel was destroyed in the second half of the twentieth century, however the inhabitants of Krzeszów rebuilt the chapel in the second decade of the twenty-first century.

== Sources ==
- Marek Staffa (1997). Słownik geografii turystycznej Sudetów, tom 8, Kotlina Kamiennogórska, Wzgórza Bramy Lubawskiej, Zawory. Wrocław: Wydawnictwo I-BiS. pp. 106, 107. ISBN 83-85773-23-1.
- Sudety Środkowe. Skala 1:40000. Jelenia Góra: Wydawnictwo Turystyczne Plan. 2005. ISBN 83-60044-44-9.
