= Kochanów, Lower Silesian Voivodeship =

Kochanów
- Village
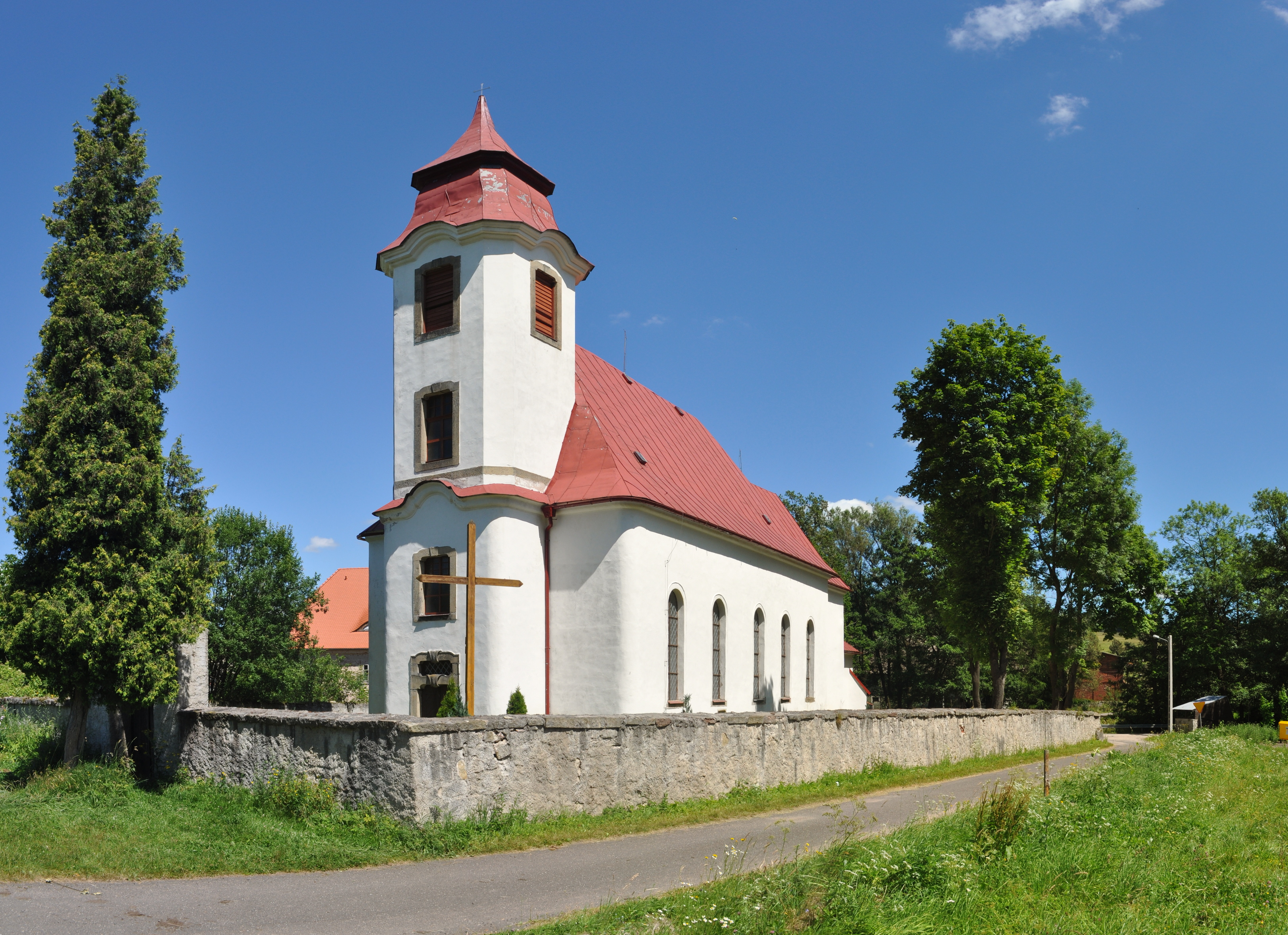
- Church of Saint Matthew in Kochanów

- Location within Poland
- Coordinates: 50°41′39″N 16°08′57″E
- Country: Poland
- Voivodeship: Lower Silesian
- County: Kamienna Góra
- Gmina: Kamienna Góra
- First mentioned: 1292
- Elevation (max.): 545 m (1,788 ft)

Population
  - Total: 203
- Time zone: UTC+1 (CET)
  - Summer (DST): UTC+2 (CEST)
- Vehicle registration: DKA

Kochanów [kɔˈxanuf] is a village in the administrative district of Gmina Kamienna Góra, within Kamienna Góra County, Lower Silesian Voivodeship, in south-western Poland.

== History ==
The village was first mentioned in 1292, when it was part of fragmented Piast-ruled Poland. After World War II, in 1945–1947, Poles expelled from Wiśniowce in pre-war south-eastern Poland annexed by the Soviet Union settled in Kochanów. An agricultural cooperative was founded in the village in 1953.
