= Grzędy Górne =

- Village
- Location within Poland
- Coordinates: 50°43′19″N 16°09′20″E
- Country: Poland
- Voivodeship: Lower Silesian
- County: Wałbrzych
- Gmina: Czarny Bór
- Population: 170

Grzędy Górne [ˈɡʐɛndɨ ˈɡurnɛ] is a village in the administrative district of Gmina Czarny Bór, within Wałbrzych County, Lower Silesian Voivodeship, in south-western Poland.
