= Grzędy, Lower Silesian Voivodeship =

Grzędy
- Village
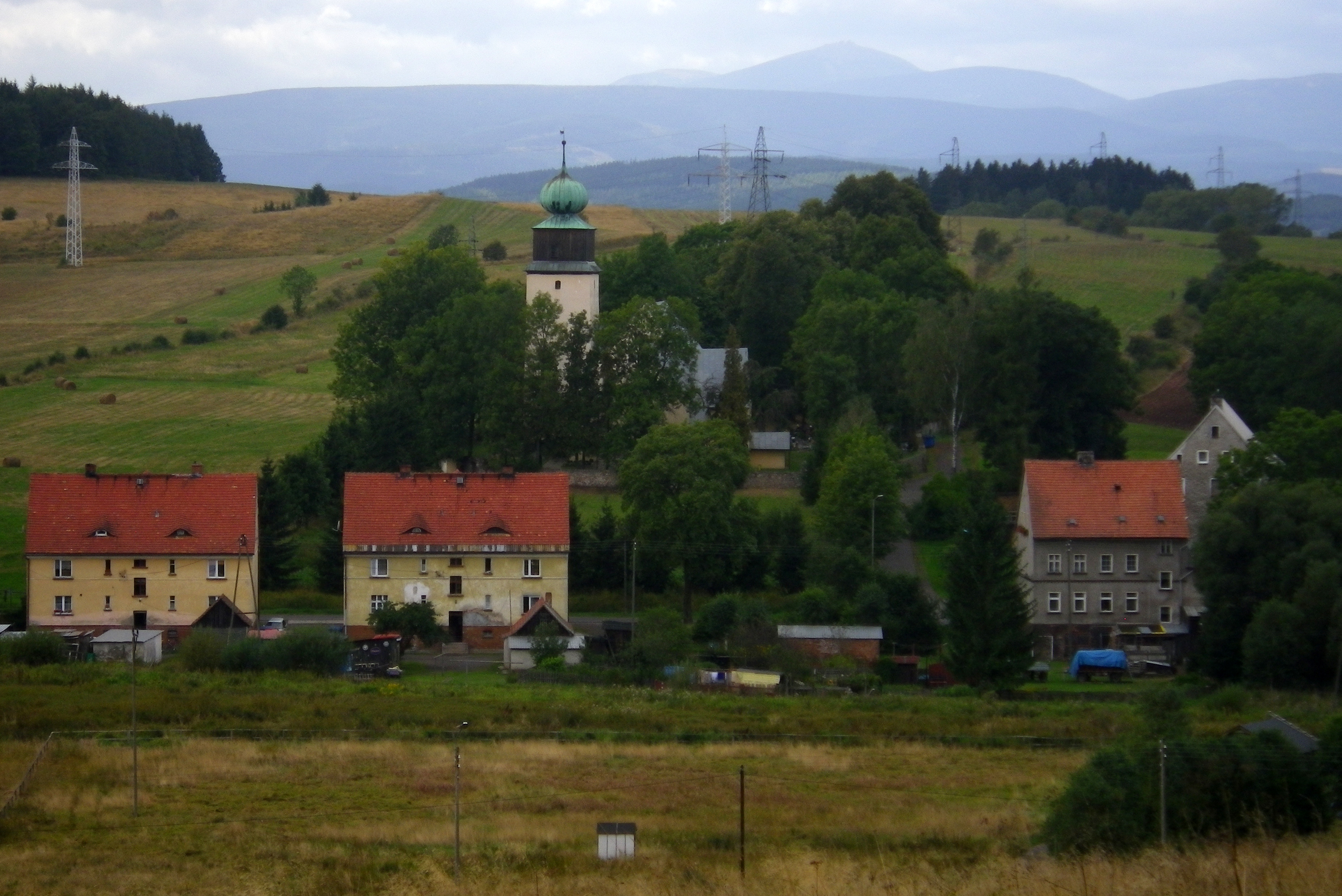

- Location within Poland
- Coordinates: 50°44′44″N 16°08′21″E
- Country: Poland
- Voivodeship: Lower Silesian
- County: Wałbrzych
- Gmina: Czarny Bór

Grzędy [ˈɡʐɛndɨ] is a village in the administrative district of Gmina Czarny Bór, within Wałbrzych County, Lower Silesian Voivodeship, in south-western Poland.

The nearby Wojaczów Castle was erected at the behest of the Silesian duke Bolko I the Strict in the 13th century. Then meant as a fortress of his Duchy of Jawor near the border with Bohemia, it became less important after the Jawor line of the Silesian Piasts became extinct and their territories were incorporated into the Lands of the Bohemian Crown in 1368.

== Notable residents ==
- Hans-Ulrich Rudel (1916–1982), German pilot during WWII and prominent neo-Nazi activist in Latin America
