= Folklore of Poland =

Research on Polish folklore begins in the 19th century and is related to the fight to maintain national consciousness (see also: Positivism in Poland, work at the grassroots).

In 1802, Hugo Kołłątaj developed the first Polish research program on folklore, but the increase in interest in this field occurred mainly in the second half of the 19th century.

Significant researchers of the 19th century include Zorian Dołęga-Chodakowski, Oskar Kolberg, Jan Karłowicz, Erazm Majewski, Zygmunt Gloger, Lucjan Malinowski, Władysław Siarkowski, Jan Świętek, Seweryn Udziela. Materials were also collected by amateur writers and ethnographers (including Kazimierz Władysław Wóycicki, Żegota Pauli, Karol Baliński, Lucjan Siemieński).

In the interwar period of the 20th century, research on Polish regional folklore was developed, and the folklore of social groups was also distinguished (Polish peasant folklore, Polish workers' folklore, etc.).

Polish Academy of Sciences Institute of Archaeology and Ethnography, founded in 1949, publishes the journal Etnografia Polska since 1958.

== See also ==
- Ethnographic Museum of Kraków
- Polish proverbs
