= Góral =

Góral is a Polish surname literally meaning the member of the subethnic group of Gorals or coming from the nickname "highlander". Notable people with the name include:

- Boleslaus Goral (1876–1960), Polish-American priest, professor, and newspaper editor
- Dariusz Góral (1991), Polish former professional footballer who played as a striker
