= Free Judges =

The Free Judges were a class of land owners in the County of Kladsko (German: Glatz, Polish: Kłodzko) who belonged to the Third Estate.

== History ==
The history of the Free Judges is closely related to the settlement of ethnic Germans in Kłodzko Valley. This settlement began under King Wenceslaus I of Bohemia and grew during the reign of his son Ottokar II. Land was allocated to the Germans by the Burgrave of Glatz, in his capacity as royal governor.

The Free Judges descended mostly from German lokators. These were people who had been granted special privileges by the King of Bohemia to reclaim and settle uninhabited areas. German law was gradually implemented in the Czech villages which already existed in the area before the arrival of the Germans. These villages were mostly located along the roads to Prague and Brno and were administered by a Schultheiß, an official appointed by the Burgrave. The German villages were administered by a Vogt, an official with a comparable position. In the first half of the 14th century, they were organized in an Association of Vogts and Judges, who saw to the enforcement of various privileges.

The Free Judges were first mentioned in a 1337 document. The laws applicable to them were handed down orally until the 14th century. They were first written down by King Charles IV on 13 July 1348, who referred to older laws. This document confirmed existing privileges and promised that Kłodzko would never be separated from the Lands of the Bohemian Crown, nor would it be sold or mortgaged. However, the King broke his promise only two years later, when his friend Arnošt of Pardubice, Archbishop of Prague, donated the two villages of Starków and Szalejów Dolny, which belonged to him and his two brothers, to the Canons Regular of Glatz. Since all subjects in these two villages would be under the jurisdiction of their new landlord, the King subjected the Free Judges of these villages to the Archbishop. Despite their objections, the King forced them to submit to the Augustinian priory.

Unlike the Free Judges, the nobility in Kłodzko held their property only as a royal fief. This meant that they were not allowed to sell it, and it could only be inherited along the male line. If no male heir existed, the fief returned to the Crown. Consequently, the noblemen tried to acquire the estates of the Free Judges, which were unencumbered. The cities and the Jesuits in the area also tried to acquire these estates. Some of the Free Judges became wealthy and gained prestige and came to be seen as lower nobility. However, in the Landtag, they formed a third estate, next to the nobility and the clergy. Legally, they were subject to the Court in Kłodzko.

During the Bohemian Revolt of 1618, most of the Free Judges sided with the rebels. They elected Free Judge Hans Wolf of Długopole Górne as their leader. He excelled during the defense of Bystrzyca Kłodzka. Nevertheless, imperial troops conquered the County of Kladsko in 1622. In 1625, 49 Free Judges were sentenced to fines, or loss of up to two thirds of their property. Almost all of the Free Judges were Protestants; in 1625 they were forced to choose between converting to Catholicism, or emigrating.

During this period, the Free Judges lost most of their wealth to fines, looting and war taxes. They also lost their legal privileges, however, these privileges were restored on 7 May 1652, after they paid Emperor Ferdinand III a large sum. These privileges included, depending on the deed in which they were granted, brewery rights, they right to license pubs and bars, the right to sell licences for various crafts, the right to hunt foxes and hares, fishing rights and the right to hunt birds. In the following decades, most of the land held by Free Judges was acquired by noble families. The villages of Łężyce and Strachocin were raised to manors.

After serfdom was abolished, most of the privileges associated with the Free Judges' estates were lost. The estates continued to exist as landed estates.

== Estates ==
The estate of a Free Judge was a separate legal entity with dominium rights. Such an estate would include land and forest, but also mills, craft workshops and often a pub, brewing rights and fishing rights. The subjects had to pay rent and provide certain services. An estate could be inherited by a child of either gender. When an estate was sold, the rights and privileges belonging to the estate were included in the sale. No taxes were levied on the estate itself, only on land added later.

== Courts ==
Free Judges presided over the village court, which consisted of lay judges elected by the villages. The village court dealt with police matters and low justice. As judges, the Free Judges were completely independent of the land owner and the nobility. The Free Judge received one third of all fines imposed; the other two thirds went to the land owner. Free Judges only had jurisdiction over free farmers.

After the Hussite wars, the nobility gradually gained jurisdiction over the villages, and during the 16th century, the Free Judges lost their judicial role.
