= Lipienica, Lower Silesian Voivodeship =

Lipienica
- Village
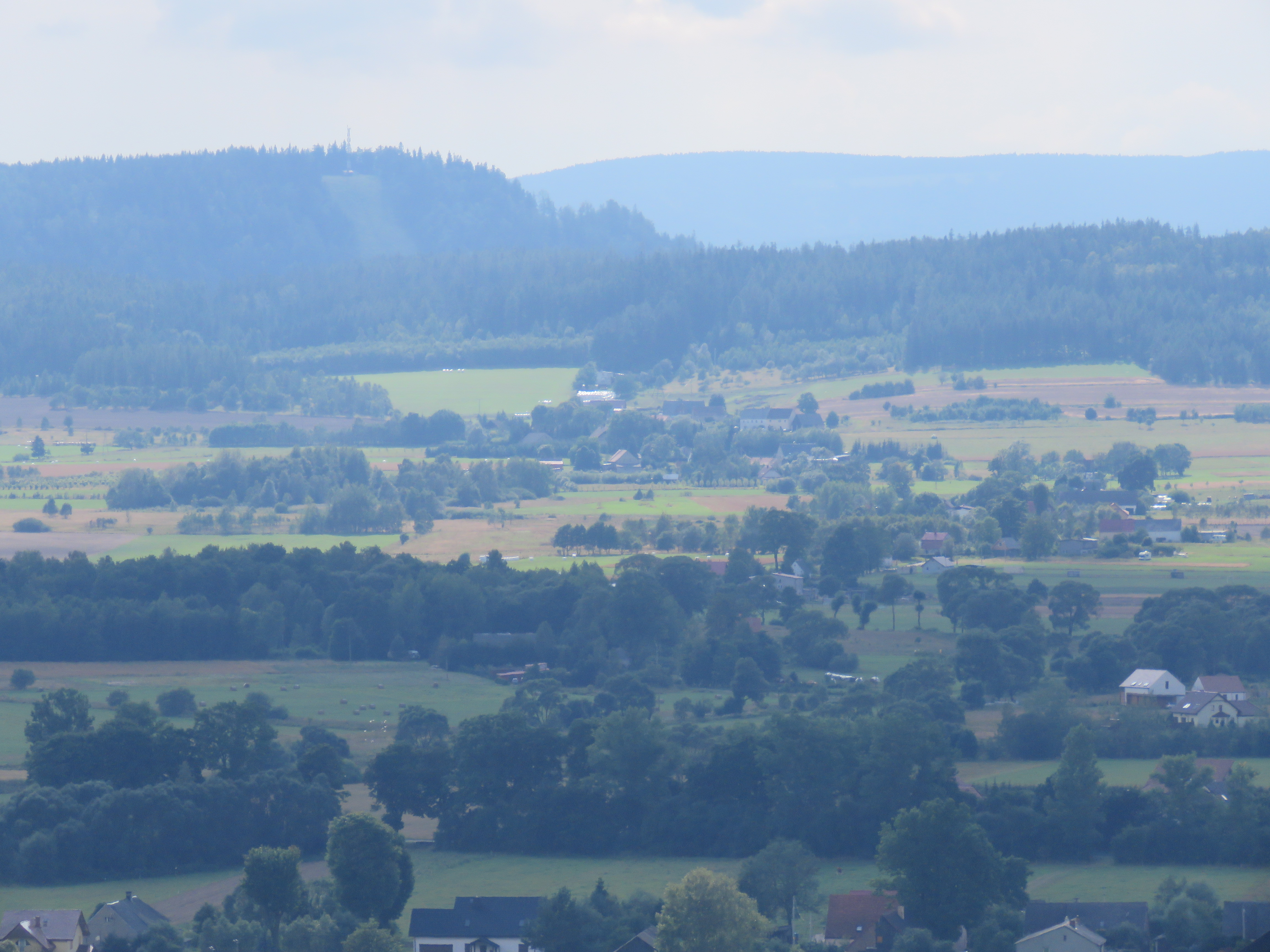

- Location within Poland
- Coordinates: 50°43′08″N 16°2′49″E
- Country: Poland
- Voivodeship: Lower Silesian
- County: Kamienna Góra
- Gmina: Kamienna Góra
- Elevation: 487 m (1,598 ft)

Population
  - Total: 170

Lipienica [lipjɛˈnit͡sa] is a village in the administrative district of Gmina Kamienna Góra, within Kamienna Góra County, Lower Silesian Voivodeship, in south-western Poland.
