= Sophia Jagiellon, Margravine of Brandenburg-Ansbach =

Sophia Jagiellon
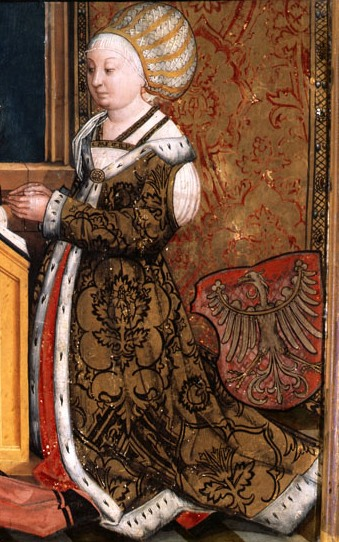

Margravine of Brandenburg-Ansbach
- Tenure: 1486–1512

Margravine of Brandenburg-Kulmbach
- Tenure: 1495–1512
- Born: 6 May 1464; Kraków, Kingdom of Poland
- Died: 5 October 1512 (aged 48); Ansbach, Margraviate of Brandenburg, Holy Roman Empire
- Burial: Monastery of Heilsbronn
- Spouse: Frederick I, Margrave of Brandenburg-Ansbach (m. 1479)
- Issue Details...: Casimir, Margrave of Brandenburg-Kulmbach Margarete of Brandenburg-Ansbach; George, Margrave of Brandenburg-Ansbach; Sofie, Duchess of Legnica; Anna, Duchess of Cieszyn; Albert, Duke of Prussia; Johann, Viceroy of Valencia; Elisabeth, Margravine of Baden-Durlach; Barbara, Landgravine of Leuchtenberg; Frederick of Brandenburg-Ansbach Wilhelm, Archbishop of Riga; John Albert, Archbishop of Magdeburg; Gumprecht of Brandenburg-Ansbach
- Dynasty: Jagiellon
- Father: Casimir IV of Poland
- Mother: Elizabeth of Austria

Sophia Jagiellon (Polish: Zofia Jagiellonka; Lithuanian: Sofija Jogailaitė; 6 May 1464 – 5 October 1512) was a princess of the Kingdom of Poland and of the Grand Duchy of Lithuania, member of the Jagiellonian dynasty, great-granddaughter of Emperor Sigismund and by marriage Margravine of Brandenburg-Ansbach and Brandenburg-Kulmbach.

Born in Kraków, she was the second daughter of Grand Duke of Lithuania and King Casimir IV of Poland and his wife Archduchess Elisabeth of Austria, daughter of the German king Albrecht. She was named after her paternal grandmother, Sophia of Halshany, Queen of Poland.

Sophia was baptised by John Gruszczynski, Bishop of Kraków. There is no information available concerning Sophia's upbringing or education.

== Life ==
=== Betrothals ===
In 1468, Sophia was first betrothed to Archduke Maximilian of Austria, son and heir of Emperor Frederick III. Then, on 8 April of the same year, Protas Černohorský of Boskovice, Bishop of Olomouc, appeared as a representative of King Matthias Corvinus of Hungary, asking the hand of Sophia, although soon Matthias preferred the hand of Sophia's elder sister, Hedwig. A marriage to Maximilian seemed more likely for Sophia, mostly because she and her sisters were all attractive brides for European nobility, since they all had claims to the thrones of Austria and Luxembourg through their mother Elisabeth. There could have been a chance that one could become Duchess of Austria or Luxembourg and transfer their patrimony to a husband and his family.

Hedwig's marriage plans with Matthias fell through when her father made an alliance with Matthias' main enemy, George of Poděbrady. Shortly after, the wedding plans between Maximilian and Sophia similarly fell through.

=== Marriage with Frederick of Brandenburg ===
It's unknown when exactly the negotiations for a marriage between Sophia and Prince Frederick of Brandeburg, son of Elector Albrecht III Achilles started. There is a presumption that the idea could emerged in the summer of 1470, when Polish deputies Dziersław z Rytwian and Stanisław Ostroróg visited Brandenburg. In 1473 the Polish royal representatives Paweł Jasieński (starost of Chełm and Belz) and Stanisław Kurozwęcki led the negotiations for the marriage between Sophia and Frederick, which ended with the signing of the formal betrothal on 7 December of that year in the city of Cadolzburg.

As for the political motives of this marriage, Sophia's father Casimir IV sought allies among the Germans, since he was concerned with the influence of the Holy Roman Emperor Frederick III, who supported the rule of the Polish prince Vladislaus in Bohemia. By the other hand, Elector Albrecht III Achilles, concerned about the growing power of Matthias Corvinus (who was threatening to take some of Albrecht's lands), decided to sought an alliance with his opponents, the Jagiellonian dynasty.

Terms concerning the marriage had been negotiated for almost two years. Originally the marriage contract was planned to be signed on 20 March 1474 and on 23 June 1474, during a meeting between representatives of both Brandenburg and Poland in Pniewy. Finally, the marriage contract was signed in October 1475 at Poznań; in representation of the Electorate of Brandenburg signed Friedrich II Sesselmann, Bishop of Lubusz, while Stanisław Kurozwęcki signed as a representative of the Kingdom of Poland. Sophia's dowry was established in 32,000 florins.

On 11 November 1475 Elector Albrecht III Achilles gave as a Bride price for his future daughter-in-law the amount of 64,000 florins. Originally, the wedding of Sophia and Frederick was to take place in Poznań, but the Elector opted for Frankfurt instead.

On 13 January 1479 Sophia, accompanied by family, left Piotrków Trybunalski for Frankfurt. She was accompanied, among others, by Andrzej Oporowski, Bishop of Przemyśl, voivodes Maciej z Bnina Moszyński and Mikołaj z Kutna, and by Piotr Kurozwęcki, Marshal of the Court.

On 14 February 1479 Sophia and Frederick were married at Frankfurt. According to the Polish chronicler Jan Długosz, the wedding was not extravagant and even the royal courtiers were not banqueted. In addition, the king's senators, knights and other clerics, who had traveled with his daughter to Frankfurt, hardly received any gifts.

Difficulties arose with the payment of Sophia's dowry. According to the marriage contract, Casimir IV was supposed to pay the first installment of 6,000 guilders by 25 December. Unable to do so, the Polish king asked for a deferment, to which Albrecht III agreed. In view of the non-payment of her dowry, Sophia was unable to take possession of her dower lands.

=== Sophia as Margravine of Brandenburg-Ansbach ===
On 11 March 1486, Sophia's father-in-law Albrecht III Achilles died. Her husband Frederick and brother-in-law Siegmund inherited the Franconian domains of the Hohenzollern dynasty. Siegmund took Kulmbach, while Frederick received Ansbach. Sophia thus became in the Margravine consort of Ansbach. Shortly after, they received in their domains the visit of Holy Roman Emperor Frederick III.

During all this time, a continuing problem was the payment of Sophia's dowry. In 1489, Sophia's brother Vladislaus II promised Frederick he would pay the rest of the money his father owed. In 1493, Frederick sent envoys to Poland on payment of dowry. On 30 September 1495, Sophia personally wrote a letter to her brother asking for the promised money. The dowry was never completely paid off until after Sophia and Frederick's deaths. The last of the money was paid to their children in several installments - respectively in 1533, 1535 and 1537.

Sophia's husband kept in touch with her brothers: in the spring of 1494, he took part in the convention in Levoča, which was attended by Vladislaus II, John I Albert, Sigismund (the future King Sigismund I the Old) and Cardinal Frederick. Frederick also planned to strengthen family ties between the Hohenzollerns and Jagiellons: Barbara, Sophia's younger sister, was suggested to marry Joachim, Hereditary Elector of Brandenburg, Frederick's nephew, and Vladislaus II could married with Anna, Joachim's sister. Finally, these marriage plans never taken place.

After the death of his brother Siegmund unmarried and childless in 1495, Frederick also inherited Bayreuth, thus Sophia also became in Margravine consort of Brandenburg-Kulmbach.

By a letter wrote by her mother-in-law Anna of Saxony dated 13 April 1505 was known that Sophia was seriously ill. Four months later, on 30 August, her mother died.

In March 1509, Sophia and her husband were present in Prague for the coronation of her nephew Louis II Jagiellon.

Exhausted by over three decades of constant pregnancies and miscarriages, (Note: It's reported in some genealogical websites that Sophia also suffered at least nine miscarriages between 1504 and 1512: A miscarriage of a daughter in the 4th month of pregnancy (19 December 1504).; A miscarriage of a daughter in the 6th month of pregnancy (16 August 1505).; A miscarriage in the 1st month of pregnancy (22 January 1506).; A miscarriage of a son in the 4th and a half-month of pregnancy (17 January 1507).; A miscarriage in the 1st month of pregnancy (4 December 1508).; A miscarriage in the 1st month of pregnancy (30 January 1509).; A miscarriage in the 1st month of pregnancy (30 March 1510).; A miscarriage of a son in the 5th and a half-month of pregnancy (11 January 1511).; A miscarriage of a son in the 4th and a half-month of pregnancy (20 March 1512).; However, there wasn't any contemporary source who could verify this statement beyond doubt.) Sophia died on 5 October 1512 in Ansbach. She was buried in the monastery of Heilsbronn. After the death of Sophia, her husband arranged an extremely boisterous wake: 1,500 cups of wine were drunk and 2 oxen and 600 fish were eaten over the course of the night.

== Issue ==
Sophia and Frederick had:

1. Elisabeth of Brandenburg-Ansbach (30 June 1480 – c. 2 July 1480).
2. Casimir, Margrave of Brandenburg-Kulmbach (27 September 1481 – 21 September 1527).
3. Margaret of Brandenburg-Ansbach (10 January 1483 – 10 July 1532).
4. George, Margrave of Brandenburg-Ansbach (4 March 1484 – 27 December 1543).
5. Sophia of Brandenburg-Ansbach (10 March 1485 – 24 May 1537), married on 14 November 1518 to Duke Frederick II of Legnica.
6. Maria of Brandenburg-Ansbach (1486 – died in infancy).
7. Anna of Brandenburg-Ansbach (5 May 1487 – 7 February 1539), married on 1 December 1518 to Duke Wenceslaus II of Cieszyn.
8. Barbara of Brandenburg-Ansbach (31 July 1488 – 2 May 1490).
9. Albrecht of Brandenburg-Ansbach (17 May 1490 – 20 March 1568), Grand Master of the Teutonic Order and then first Duke of Prussia.
10. Frederick of Brandenburg-Ansbach (13 June 1491 – c. 1497).
11. Johann of Brandenburg-Ansbach (9 January 1493 – 5 July 1525), Viceroy of Valencia.
12. Elisabeth of Brandenburg-Ansbach (25 March 1494 – 31 May 1518), married on 29 September 1510 to Margrave Ernest of Baden-Durlach.
13. Barbara of Brandenburg-Ansbach (24 September 1495 – 23 September 1552), married on 26 July 1528 to Landgrave George III of Leuchtenberg.
14. Frederick of Brandenburg-Ansbach (17 January 1497 – 20 August 1536), a canon in Würzburg and Salzburg; he abandoned the ecclesiastical career and became in the first Protestant member of the Hohenzollern dynasty.
15. William of Brandenburg-Ansbach, (30 June 1498 – 4 February 1563), Archbishop of Riga since 1539.
16. Johann Albrecht of Brandenburg-Ansbach (20 September 1499 – 17 May 1550), Archbishop of Magdeburg since 1545.
17. Frederick Albrecht of Brandenburg-Ansbach (30 November 1501 – 24 July 1504).
18. Gumprecht of Brandenburg-Ansbach (16 July 1503 – 25 June 1528), a canon in Bamberg.

== Ancestry ==
Ancestors of Sophia Jagiellon, Margravine of Brandenburg-Ansbach

8. Algirdas, Grand Duke of Lithuania
4. Władysław II Jagiełło of Poland
9. Uliana Alexandrovna of Tver
2. Casimir IV of Poland
10. Andrew Ivanovich, Prince of Halshany
5. Sophia of Halshany
11. Alexandra Dimitrijewna of Drutsk
1. Sophia of Poland
12. Albert IV, Duke of Austria
6. Albert II of Germany
13. Johanna Sophia of Bavaria
3. Elizabeth of Austria
14. Sigismund, Holy Roman Emperor
7. Elizabeth of Luxembourg
15. Barbara of Celje

== Bibliography ==
- K. Baczkowski: Polish history of late-medieval, Kraków 1999, ISBN 83-85719-40-7, p. 230, 236, 249.
- M. Duczmal: Jagiellonowie. Biographical Lexicon, Poznań-Kraków 1996, ISBN 83-08-02577-3, pp. 495–507.
- W. Dworzaczek: Genealogy, Warsaw, 1959.
- E. Rudzki: Polish queens, vol. 1, Warsaw 1990, p. 134, 141, 148, 153, 154.
- Z. Wdowiszewski: Genealogy of the House of Vasa and Jagiello of Poland, Kraków 2005, pp. 110–112.
- Ward, A.W.; Prothero, G.W.; Leathes, Stanley, eds. (1934). The Cambridge Modern History. Vol. XIII. Cambridge at the University Press.

Sophia Jagiellon, Margravine of Brandenburg-Ansbach House of Jagiellon Born: 6 May 1464 Died: 5 October 1512
German nobility
Preceded by Anna of Saxony	Margravine of Brandenburg-Ansbach; 11 March 1486 - 5 October 1512	Vacant Title next held by Emilie of Saxony
Preceded by Anna of Saxony	Margravine of Brandenburg-Kulmbach; 26 February 1495 - 5 October 1512	Vacant Title next held by Susanna of Bavaria
