= Barbara of Brandenburg-Ansbach-Kulmbach =

- Born: 24 September 1495; Ansbach
- Died: 23 September 1552 (aged 56); Karlovy Vary
- Buried: Church of the Assumption in Pfreimd
- Noble family: House of Hohenzollern
- Spouse: George III, Landgrave of Leuchtenberg
- Father: Frederick I, Margrave of Brandenburg-Ansbach
- Mother: Sophia Jagiellon

Barbara of Brandenburg-Ansbach-Kulmbach (24 September 1495 in Ansbach – 23 September 1552 in Karlovy Vary) was a princess of Brandenburg-Ansbach by birth and marriage Landgravine of Leuchtenberg.

== Life ==
Barbara was a daughter of Margrave Frederick the Elder of Brandenburg-Ansbach and Bayreuth (1460-1536) from his marriage to Sophia Jagiellon (1464-1512), daughter of King Casimir IV Jagiello of Poland.

She married on 29 September 1527 at the Plassenburg to Landgrave George III of Leuchtenberg (1502-1555). She brought a dowry of 10000guilders into the marriage and a dower of 3000guilders was settled on her.

In 1549, she apologized in writing to her many relatives, because her son had married the very wealthy Matilda de la Marck-Arenberg, without consulting most of her relatives. The marriage had been mediated by her brother Albert and was instrumental in restoring the financial health of the Landgraviate.

Barbara died in 1552 and was buried in the Church of the Assumption in Pfreimd. A red marble grave place with her coat of arms can be found in front of the altar.

== Issue ==
From her marriage, Barbara had the following children:

1. George IV (d. 1553)
2. Louis Henry (1529-1567), Landgrave of Leuchtenberg, married in 1549 to Countess Matilda de la Marck-Arenberg (1530-1603)
3. Elisabeth (1537/8-1579), married in 1559 to Count John VI of Nassau-Dillenburg (1536-1606)
4. Barbara

== Ancestry ==
Ancestors of Barbara of Brandenburg-Ansbach-Kulmbach

8. Frederick I, Elector of Brandenburg (1371–1440)
4. Albrecht III, Elector of Brandenburg (1414–1486)
9. Elisabeth of Bavaria-Landshut (1383–1442)
2. Frederick I, Margrave of Brandenburg-Ansbach (1460–1536)
10. Frederick II, Elector of Saxony (1412–1464)
5. Anna of Saxony (1437–1512)
11. Margaret of Austria (1416–1486)
1. Barbara of Brandenburg-Ansbach-Kulmbach (1495-1552)
12. Władysław II Jagiełło of Poland (1362–1434)
6. Casimir IV of Poland (1427–1492)
13. Sophia of Halshany (1405–1461)
3. Sophia of Poland (1464–1512)
14. Albert II of Germany (1397–1439)
7. Elisabeth of Austria (1435–1505)
15. Elizabeth of Luxembourg (1409–1442)
