= Elisabeth of Brandenburg-Ansbach-Kulmbach =

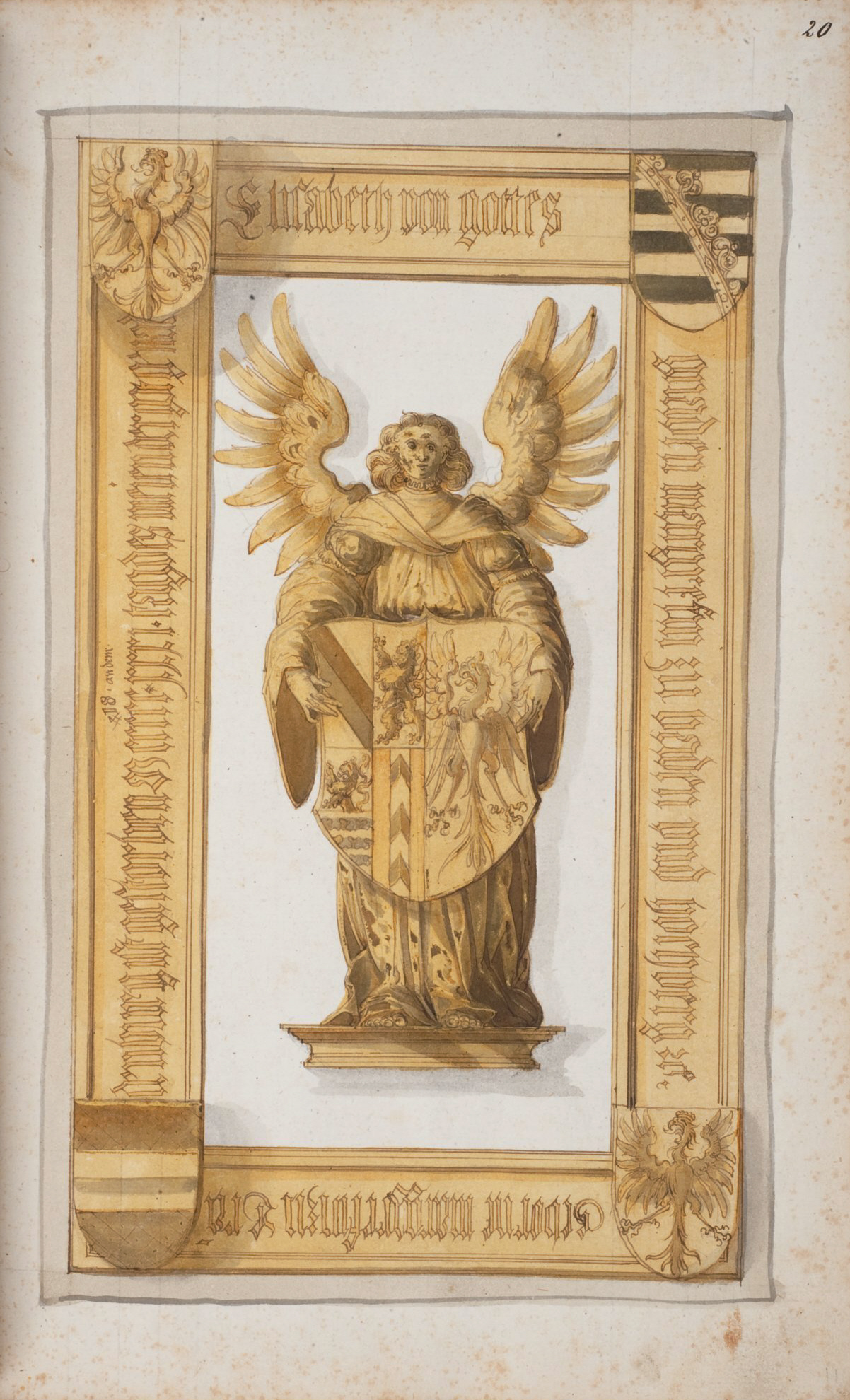
- Epitaph for Elisabeth in the manuscript Memoriae posteritatique inclytae domus Wirtembergicae sacrum of 1583
- Born: 25 March 1494; Ansbach
- Died: 31 May 1518 (aged 24); Pforzheim
- Buried: Stiftskirche, Stuttgart
- Noble family: House of Hohenzollern
- Spouse: Ernest, Margrave of Baden-Durlach
- Father: Frederick I, Margrave of Brandenburg-Ansbach
- Mother: Sophia of Poland

Elizabeth of Brandenburg-Ansbach-Kulmbach (25 March 1494 in Ansbach – 31 May 1518 in Pforzheim) was a princess of Brandenburg-Ansbach by birth and by marriage Margravine of Baden.

== Life ==
Elizabeth was a daughter of Margrave Frederick "the Elder" of Brandenburg-Ansbach (1460–1536) from his marriage to Sophia of Poland (1464–1512), a daughter of King Casimir IV Jagiellon of Poland. She was a granddaughter of the powerful Elector Albert III Achilles of Brandenburg. They finally succeeded in 1515. Christopher I abdicated and his sons divided the Margraviate. The Margraviate would remain divided until 1771.

Elisabeth died in 1518 and was buried in the Stiftskirche, Stuttgart.

== Issue ==
On 29 September 1510 she married Ernest, Margrave of Baden-Durlach; they had the following children:

- Albert (July 1511 – 12 December 1542), participated in the Austrian war against the Turks in 1541 in Hungary and died on the way back in Wasserburg am Inn
- Anna (April 1512 – after 1579) married on 11 February 1537 to Count Charles I of Hohenzollern (1516 – 8 March 1576)
- Amalie (February 1513; died 1594) married in 1561 to Count Frederick II of Löwenstein (22 August 1528 – 5 June 1569)
- Maria Jacobea (October 1514; died: 1592) married in February 1577 to Count Wolfgang II of Barby (11 December 1531 – 23 March 1615)
- Marie Cleopha (September 1515 – 28 April 1580) married in 1548 to Count William of Schultz (died circa 1566)
- Elizabeth (20 May 1516; died: 9 May 1568), married:
  1. in 1533 to Count Gabriel von Salamanca-Ortenburg (died: December 1539)
  2. on 30 July 1543 to Count Conrad II of Castell (10 July 1519 – 8 July 1577)
- Bernhard (February 1517 – 20 January 1553), ruling Margrave of Baden-Durlach

== Ancestry ==
Ancestors of Elisabeth of Brandenburg-Ansbach-Kulmbach

8. Frederick I, Elector of Brandenburg (1371–1440)
4. Albrecht III, Elector of Brandenburg (1414–1486)
9. Elisabeth of Bavaria-Landshut (1383–1442)
2. Frederick I, Margrave of Brandenburg-Ansbach (1460–1536)
10. Frederick II, Elector of Saxony (1412–1464)
5. Anna of Saxony (1437–1512)
11. Margaret of Austria (1416–1486)
1. Elisabeth of Brandenburg-Ansbach-Kulmbach (1494–1518)
12. Władysław II Jagiełło of Poland (1362–1434)
6. Casimir IV of Poland (1427–1492)
13. Sophia of Halshany (1405–1461)
3. Sophia of Poland (1464–1512)
14. Albert II of Germany (1397–1439)
7. Elisabeth of Austria (1435–1505)
15. Elizabeth of Luxembourg (1409–1442)
