= Sophie of Brandenburg-Ansbach-Kulmbach =

- Born: 10 March 1485; Ansbach
- Died: 24 May 1537 (aged 52); Legnica
- Spouse: Frederick II of Legnica
- House: House of Hohenzollern
- Father: Frederick the Elder of Brandenburg-Ansbach and Bayreuth
- Mother: Sophia of Poland

Sophie of Brandenburg-Ansbach-Kulmbach (10 March 1485, Ansbach – 24 May 1537, Liegnitz (Legnica)) was a princess of Brandenburg-Ansbach and was by marriage Duchess of Legnica.

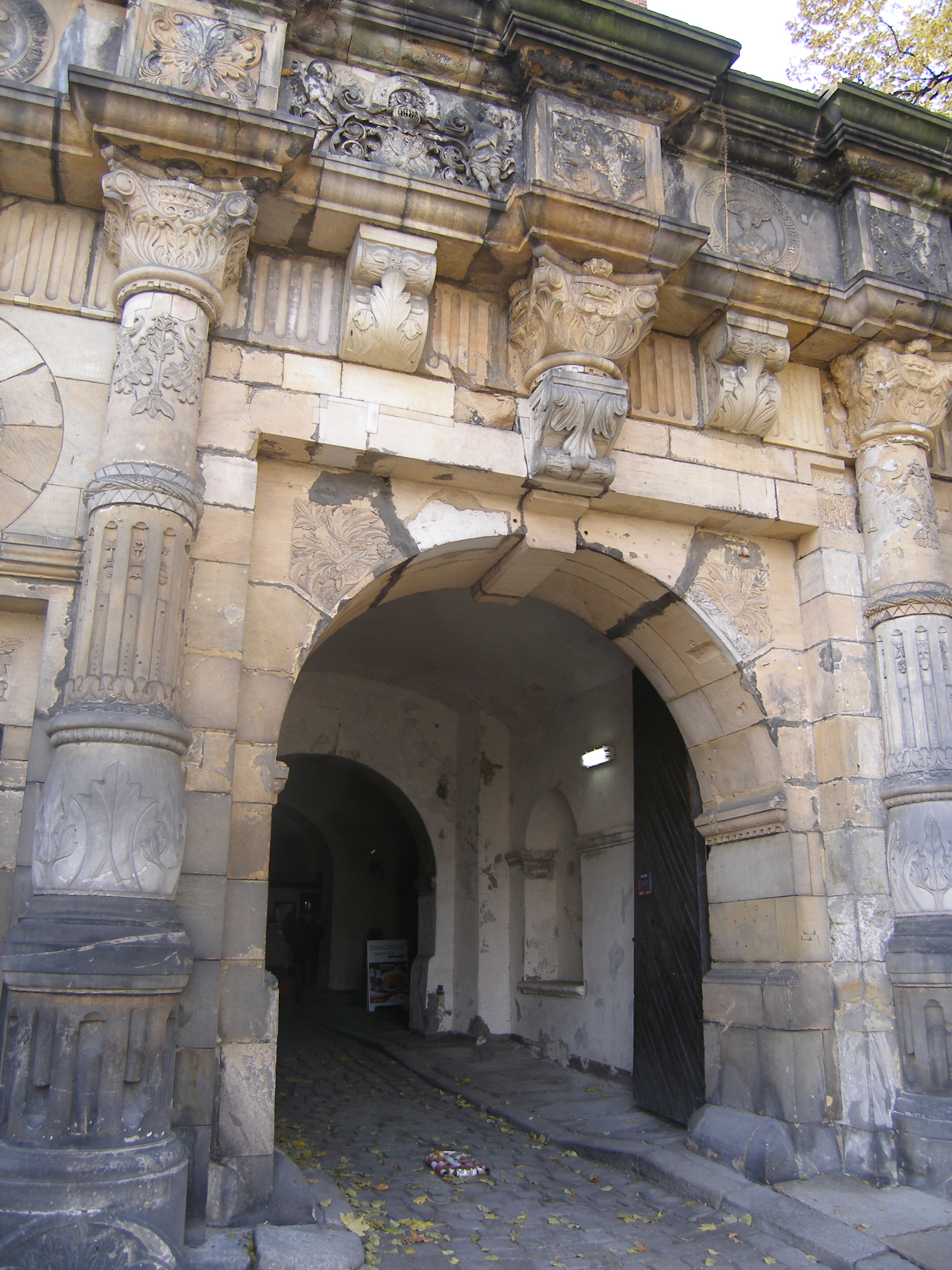
The Renaissance portal of Legnica Castle with the busts of Duke Frederick and his wife Sophie

== Life ==
Sophie was a daughter of the Margrave Frederick the Elder of Brandenburg-Ansbach and Bayreuth (1460–1536) from his marriage to Sophia of Poland ( 1464–1512), daughter of King Casimir IV of Poland.

She married on 24 November 1518 the Duke Frederick II of Legnica in Silesia (1480–1547). The Renaissance main entrance portal at Legnica Castle is decorated with busts of Sophie and Frederick, The pair is also shown in a window of the Church of Our Lady of Legnica.

Sophie is not to be confused with her eponymous niece (1535–1587), who was also Duchess of Legnica.

== Offspring ==
From her marriage, Sophie had the following children:

- Frederick III (1520–1570), Duke of Legnica.

married in 1538 princess Catherine of Mecklenburg (1518-1581)

- George II (1523–1586), Duke of Brzeg

married in 1545 princess Barbara of Brandenburg (1527-1595)

- Sophie (1525–1546)

married in 1545 Elector John George of Brandenburg (1525-1598)

== Ancestry ==
Ancestors of Sophie of Brandenburg-Ansbach-Kulmbach

8. Frederick I, Elector of Brandenburg (1371–1440)
4. Albrecht III, Elector of Brandenburg (1414–1486)
9. Elisabeth of Bavaria-Landshut (1383–1442)
2. Frederick I, Margrave of Brandenburg-Ansbach (1460–1536)
10. Frederick II, Elector of Saxony (1412–1464)
5. Anna of Saxony (1437–1512)
11. Margaret of Austria (1416–1486)
1. Sophie of Brandenburg-Ansbach-Kulmbach (1485–1537)
12. Władysław II Jagiełło of Poland (1362–1434)
6. Casimir IV of Poland (1427–1492)
13. Sophia of Halshany (1405–1461)
3. Sophia of Poland (1464–1512)
14. Albert II of Germany (1397–1439)
7. Elisabeth of Austria (1435–1505)
15. Elizabeth of Luxembourg (1409–1442)

== Literature ==
- A. velvet: Chronicle of Legnica, printed by W. Pentecost, 1868, p. 204 ff.
