= Margaret of Brandenburg (disambiguation) =

Margaret of Brandenburg (1270–1315) was the daughter of Albert III, Margrave of Brandenburg-Salzwedel; wife first of Przemysł II and second of Albert III, Duke of Saxe-Lauenburg

Margaret of Brandenburg may also refer to:

- Margaret of Brandenburg (1410–1465), daughter of Frederick I, Elector of Brandenburg; wife in turn to Albrecht V of Mecklenburg, Louis VIII, Duke of Bavaria, and Martin von Waldenfels
- Margaret of Brandenburg (1450–1489), daughter of Frederick II, Elector of Brandenburg; wife of Bogislaw X, Duke of Pomerania
- Margaret of Brandenburg (1453–1509), princess of Brandenburg by birth and abbess of the Poor Clares monastery at Hof
- Margaret of Brandenburg (1511–1577), daughter of Joachim I Nestor, Elector of Brandenburg; wife first of George I, Duke of Pomerania-Wolgast and second of John V, Prince of Anhalt-Zerbst
