= 1509 =

1509 in various calendars
- Gregorian calendar: 1509; MDIX
- Ab urbe condita: 2262
- Armenian calendar: 958; ԹՎ ՋԾԸ
- Assyrian calendar: 6259
- Balinese saka calendar: 1430–1431
- Bengali calendar: 915–916
- Berber calendar: 2459
- English Regnal year: 24 Hen. 7 – 1 Hen. 8
- Buddhist calendar: 2053
- Burmese calendar: 871
- Byzantine calendar: 7017–7018
- Chinese calendar: 戊辰年 (Earth Dragon); 4206 or 3999 — to — 己巳年 (Earth Snake); 4207 or 4000
- Coptic calendar: 1225–1226
- Discordian calendar: 2675
- Ethiopian calendar: 1501–1502
- Hebrew calendar: 5269–5270
- Hindu calendars
- Vikram Samvat: 1565–1566
- Shaka Samvat: 1430–1431
- Kali Yuga: 4609–4610
- Holocene calendar: 11509
- Igbo calendar: 509–510
- Iranian calendar: 887–888
- Islamic calendar: 914–915
- Japanese calendar: Eishō 6 (永正６年)
- Javanese calendar: 1426–1427
- Julian calendar: 1509; MDIX
- Korean calendar: 3842
- Minguo calendar: 403 before ROC 民前403年
- Nanakshahi calendar: 41
- Thai solar calendar: 2051–2052
- Tibetan calendar: ས་ཕོ་འབྲུག་ལོ་ (male Earth-Dragon); 1635 or 1254 or 482 — to — ས་མོ་སྦྲུལ་ལོ་ (female Earth-Snake); 1636 or 1255 or 483

Year 1509 (MDIX) was a common year starting on Monday of the Julian calendar.

== Events ==
=== January–March ===
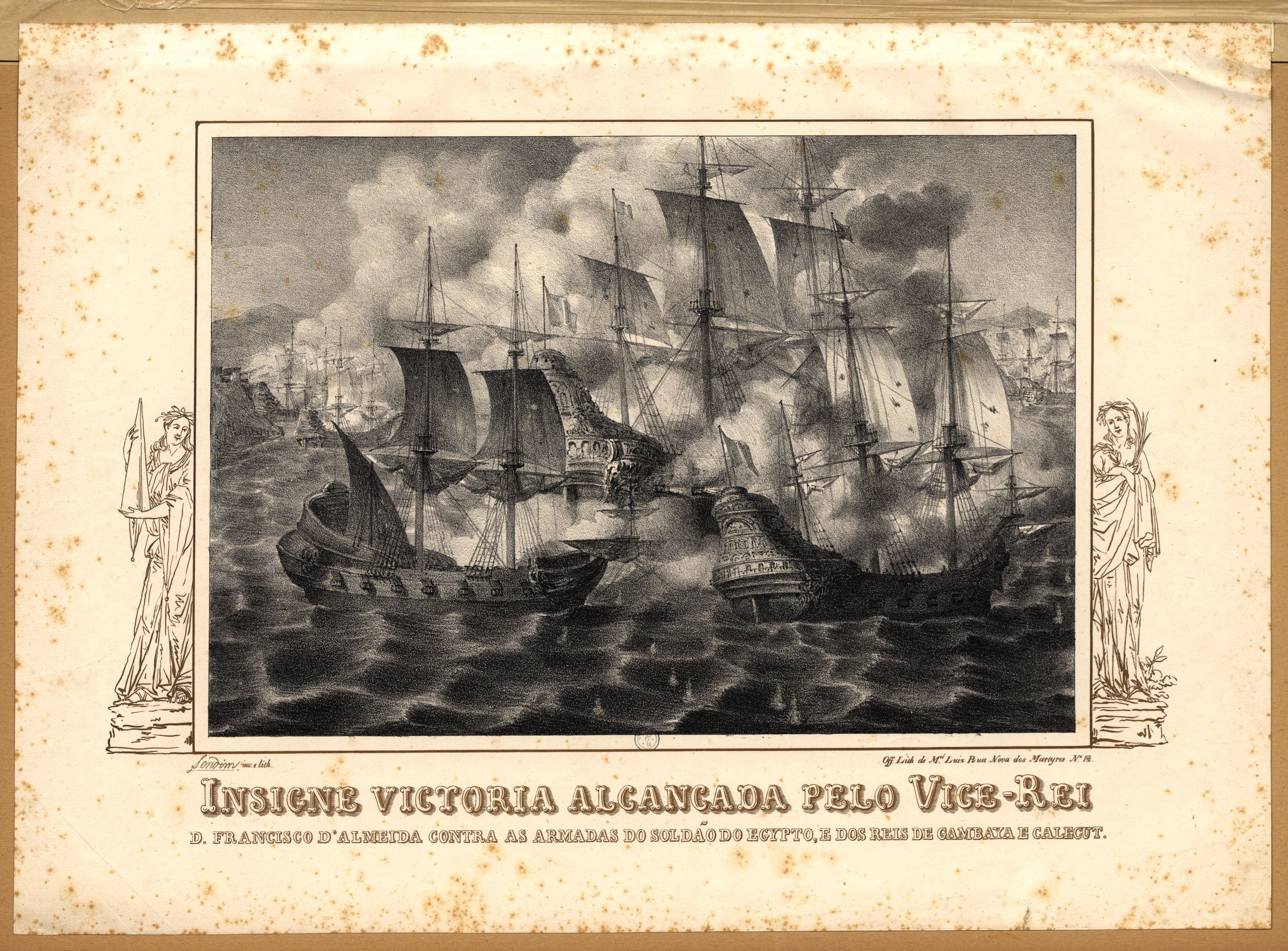
February 3: Almeida and troops defeat Indian and Egyptian forces at the Battle of Diu

- January 21 – The Portuguese first arrive at the Seven Islands of Bombay and land at Mahim after capturing a barge of the Gujarat Sultanate in the Mahim Creek.
- January 30 – French ambassador Janus Lascaris leaves Venice, after being recalled by king Louis XII in the eve of the War of the League of Cambrai.
- February 3 – Battle of Diu: The Portuguese defeat a coalition of Indians, Muslims and Italians.
- March 13 – At Bourges, the French king Louis XII ratifies treaties that were concluded 10 December 1508, regarding the creation of the League of Cambrai.
- March 18 – Maximilian I, Holy Roman Emperor, names Margaretha land guardians of the Habsburg Netherlands.
- March 23 – Pope Julius II issues the papal bull Petierunt a nobis, declaring his allegiance to the League of Cambrai.

=== April–June ===
- April 17 – In Venice, the envoy of the French king Louis XII delivers the declaration of war to the Venetian doge Leonardo Loredan, thus marking the official beginning of the War of the League of Cambrai.
- April 21 – Henry VIII becomes King of England on the death of his father, Henry VII.
- April 27 – Pope Julius II places Venice under interdict and excommunication for refusing to cede part of Romagna to papal control.
- May 2 – Juan Ponce de León obtains authorization to bring his family from Spain to his home in the Casa de Contratación in Caparra, Puerto Rico.
- May 9
  - The French army under the command of Louis XII crosses the Adda River at Cassano d'Adda.
  - The Venetians, encamped around the town of Treviglio, move south towards the Po River in search of better positions.
- May 14 – Battle of Agnadello: French forces defeat the Venetians. The League of Cambrai occupies Venice's mainland territories.
- May 17 – Venice made an effort to appease the emperor Maximilian I by offering various political and territorial concessions, but the effort failed.
- June 11
  - Henry VIII marries Catherine of Aragon.
  - Luca Pacioli's De divina proportione, concerning the golden ratio, is published in Venice, with illustrations by Leonardo da Vinci.
- June 19 – Brasenose College, Oxford, is founded by a lawyer, Sir Richard Sutton, of Prestbury, Cheshire, and the Bishop of Lincoln, William Smyth.
- June 24 – King Henry VIII and Queen Consort Catherine of Aragon are crowned.

=== July–September ===
- July 17 – Venetian forces retake the city of Padua from French forces.
- July 26 – Krishnadevaraya ascends the throne of the Vijayanagara Empire.
- August 10 – Maximillian I of the Holy Roman Empire along with French allies begins a siege of Padua that would last for months to retake the city.
- August 19 – Maximillian I orders all Jews within the Holy Roman Empire to destroy all books opposing Christianity.
- September 10 – The Constantinople earthquake destroys 109 mosques and kills an estimated 10,000 people.
- September 11 – Portuguese fidalgo Diogo Lopes de Sequeira becomes the first European to reach Malacca, having crossed the Gulf of Bengal.
- September 27 – A violent storm ravages the Dutch coast, killing potentially thousands of people.

=== October–December ===
- October 1 – The siege of Padua ends with Venetian victory, causing the retreat of HRE and French forces back to Tyrol and Milan.
- November 4 – Afonso de Albuquerque becomes the Viceroy of Portuguese India, replacing Francisco de Almeida, who departs five days later from Diu. Almeida never makes it home, getting killed along with his 64 men in a battle on March 1 with the local Khoekhoe people at South Africa's Cape of Good Hope.
- November 10 – Uriel von Gemmingen is assigned to secure others' opinions before continuing the Jewish book purge started on August 19th.
- December 1 – Prince Le Oanh is installed as the new Emperor of Vietnam by a coup d'etat against his cousin, Emperor Le Uy Muc, and is enthroned at the age of 14 as Emperor Le Tuong Duc. Uy Muc is granted his request to be allowed to commit suicide rather than to be executed.

=== Date unknown ===
- Erasmus writes his most famous work, In Praise of Folly.
- St Paul's School, London is founded by John Colet, Dean of St Paul's Cathedral.
- Royal Grammar School, Guildford, England, is founded under the will of Robert Beckingham.
- Queen Elizabeth's Grammar School, Blackburn, England, is founded as a grammar school for boys.
- Georg Tannstetter is appointed by Maximilian I as the Professor of Astronomy at the University of Vienna.
- Johannes Pfefferkorn writes his fourth and fifth pamphlets condemning the Jewish faith and people, Das Osterbuch and Der Judenfeind.
- Basil Solomon becomes Syriac Orthodox Maphrian of the East.

== Births ==
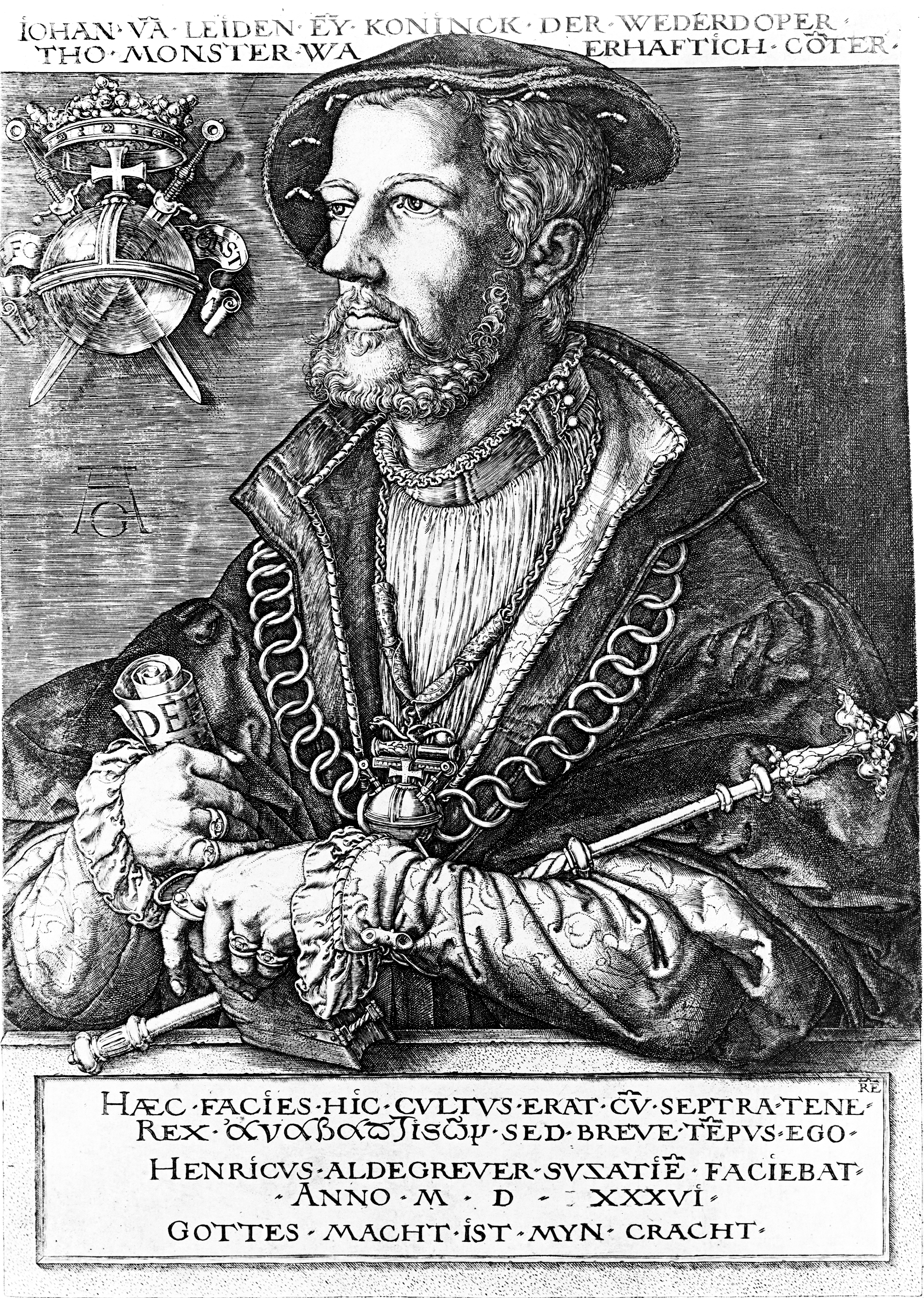
John of Leiden

- January 2 – Henry of Stolberg, German nobleman (d. 1572)
- January 3 – Gian Girolamo Albani, Italian Catholic cardinal (d. 1591)
- January 25 – Giovanni Morone, Italian Catholic cardinal (d. 1580)
- February 2 – John of Leiden, Dutch Anabaptist leader (d. 1536)
- February 10 – Vidus Vidius, Italian surgeon and anatomist (d. 1569)
- March 25 – Girolamo Dandini, Italian Cardinal
- March 27 – Wolrad II, Count of Waldeck-Eisenberg, German nobleman (d. 1578)
- April 23 – Afonso of Portugal, Portuguese Roman Catholic cardinal (d. 1540)
- July 4 – Magnus III of Mecklenburg-Schwerin, German Lutheran bishop of the Prince-Bishopric of Schwerin (d. 1550)
- July 10 – John Calvin, French religious reformer (d. 1564)
- July 25 – Philip II, Count of Nassau-Saarbrücken, German nobleman (d. 1554)
- August 3 – Étienne Dolet, French scholar and printer (d. 1546)
- August 7 – Joachim I, Prince of Anhalt-Dessau, German prince (d. 1561)
- August 25 – Ippolito II d'Este, Italian cardinal and statesman (d. 1572)
- October 20 – Arthur Stewart, Duke of Rothesay, Scottish prince (d. 1510)
- November 4 – John, Duke of Münsterberg-Oels, Polish-German nobleman (d. 1565)
- November 7 – Bernardino Telesio, Italian philosopher and natural scientist (d. 1588)

=== Date unknown ===
- Anneke Esaiasdochter, Dutch Anabaptist (d. 1539)
- Élie Vinet, French humanist (d. 1587)
- François de Scépeaux, French governor (d. 1571)
- François Douaren, French jurist (d. 1559)
- Gonzalo Jiménez de Quesada, Spanish conquistador (d. 1579)
- Guillaume Le Testu, French privateer (d. 1573)
- John Erskine of Dun, Scottish religious reformer (d. 1591)
- Naoe Kagetsuna, Japanese Clan Officer (d. 1577)
- Stanisław Odrowąż, Polish nobleman (d. 1545)

== Deaths ==
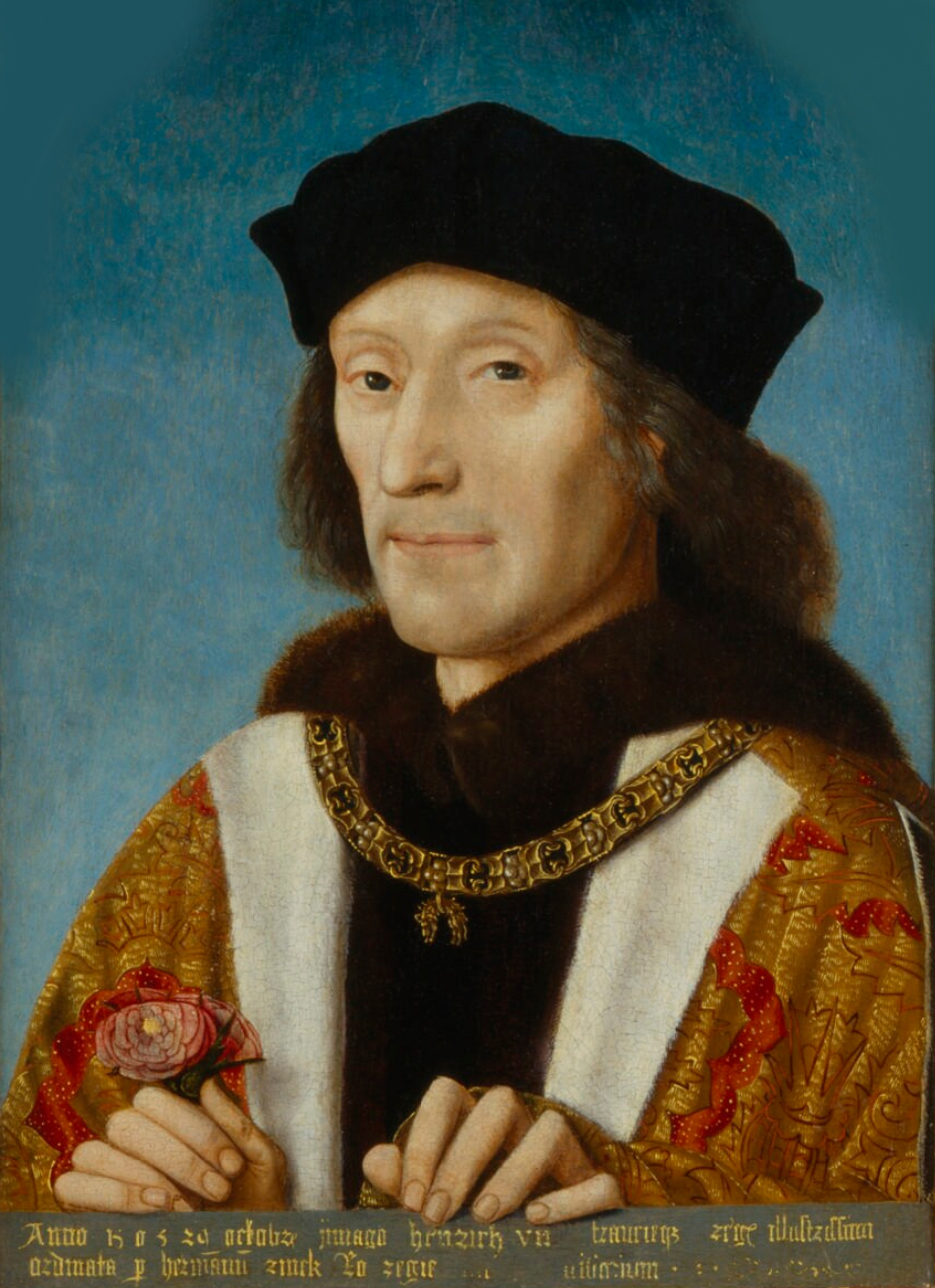
Henry VII of England

- January – Adam Kraft, German sculptor and architect (b. circa 1460)
- January 27 – John I, Count Palatine of Simmern, German nobleman (b. 1459)
- March 14 – Giovanni Antonio Sangiorgio, Italian cardinal (b. unknown)
- April 21 – Henry VII of England, King of England and Lord of Ireland (b. 1457)
- April 27 – Margaret of Brandenburg, German abbess of the Poor Clares monastery at Hof (b. 1453)
- May 28 – Caterina Sforza, Italian countess of Forlì (b. 1463)
- June 29 – Margaret Beaufort, Countess of Richmond and Derby, mother of Henry VII of England (b. 1443)
- July 11 – William II, Landgrave of Hesse, German nobleman (b. 1469)
- July 16
  - Joao da Nova, Portuguese explorer (b. 1460)
  - Mikalojus Radvila the Old, Lithuanian nobleman (b. circa 1450)
- July 28 – Ignatius Noah of Lebanon, Syriac Orthodox patriarch of Antioch (b. 1451).
- December 1 – Lê Uy Mục, 8th king of the later Lê Dynasty of Vietnam (b. 1488)

=== Date unknown ===
- Dmitry Ivanovich, Russian Grand Prince (b. 1483)
- Eleanor de Poitiers, Burgundian courter and writer (b. circa 1444)
- Hans Seyffer, German sculptor and woodcarver (b. circa 1460)
- Shen Zhou, Chinese painter (b. 1427)
- Viranarasimha Raya, Indian ruler of the Vijayanagar Empire (b. unknown)
