= Amalie of Brandenburg =

Countess Palatine of Zweibrücken (1461–1481)

- Born: 1 October 1461; Plassenburg
- Died: 3 September 1481 (aged 19); Baden-Baden
- Noble family: Hohenzollern
- Spouse: Kaspar, Count Palatine of Zweibrücken
- Father: Albert III Achilles, Elector of Brandenburg
- Mother: Anna of Saxony

Amalie of Brandenburg (born: 1 October 1461 on the Plassenburg; died: 3 September 1481 in Baden-Baden) was, by marriage, Countess Palatine and Duchess of Zweibrücken and Veldenz.

== Life ==
Amalie was the eldest daughter of the Elector Albert III Achilles of Brandenburg (1414–1486) from his second marriage to Anna (1436–1512), daughter of the Elector Frederick II of Saxony.

At the age of four years Amalie was engaged with Count Palatine and Duke Kaspar of Zweibrücken-Veldenz (1458–1527) after her older half-sister Margaret, had broken off her engagement with him. The marriage took place ten years later on 19 April 1478 in Zweibrücken. Amalie received as her Wittum: Veldenz Castle, Bergzabern, Annweiler, the Herxheim court, the community of Falkenburg and Hasloch.

Amalia left her husband and returned to her father when Kaspar showed signs of "madness". Before her 20th birthday, Amalie got very ill and went to bathe in the spa Baden-Baden, where she died. A fierce controversy erupted about her dower: her father-in-law, Count Palatine Louis I of Zweibrücken-Veldenz tried to recover it, but Kaspar refused to return it.

== References and sources ==
- Julius von Minutoli (eds.): Das kaiserliche Buch des Markgrafen Albrecht Achilles,' Schneider, 1850; reprinted: Zeller, 1984, ISBN 3-535-02459-5, p. 488.
