= 1459 =

1459 in various calendars
- Gregorian calendar: 1459; MCDLIX
- Ab urbe condita: 2212
- Armenian calendar: 908; ԹՎ ՋԸ
- Assyrian calendar: 6209
- Balinese saka calendar: 1380–1381
- Bengali calendar: 865–866
- Berber calendar: 2409
- English Regnal year: 37 Hen. 6 – 38 Hen. 6
- Buddhist calendar: 2003
- Burmese calendar: 821
- Byzantine calendar: 6967–6968
- Chinese calendar: 戊寅年 (Earth Tiger); 4156 or 3949 — to — 己卯年 (Earth Rabbit); 4157 or 3950
- Coptic calendar: 1175–1176
- Discordian calendar: 2625
- Ethiopian calendar: 1451–1452
- Hebrew calendar: 5219–5220
- Hindu calendars
- Vikram Samvat: 1515–1516
- Shaka Samvat: 1380–1381
- Kali Yuga: 4559–4560
- Holocene calendar: 11459
- Igbo calendar: 459–460
- Iranian calendar: 837–838
- Islamic calendar: 863–864
- Japanese calendar: Chōroku 3 (長禄３年)
- Javanese calendar: 1375–1376
- Julian calendar: 1459; MCDLIX
- Korean calendar: 3792
- Minguo calendar: 453 before ROC 民前453年
- Nanakshahi calendar: −9
- Thai solar calendar: 2001–2002
- Tibetan calendar: ས་ཕོ་སྟག་ལོ་ (male Earth-Tiger); 1585 or 1204 or 432 — to — ས་མོ་ཡོས་ལོ་ (female Earth-Hare); 1586 or 1205 or 433

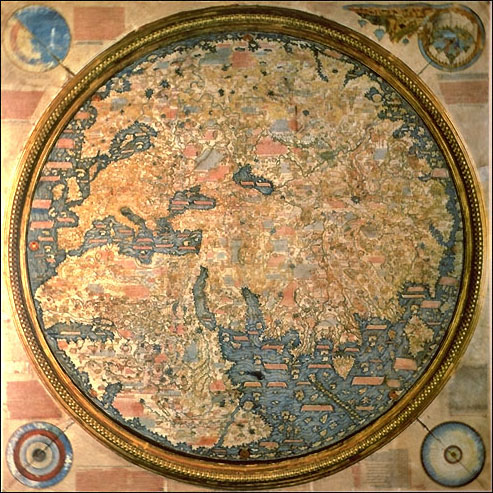
April 24: The Fra Mauro map of the known world is completed, suggesting that explorers can sail westward across unexplored seas to reach Asia.

Year 1459 (MCDLIX) was a common year starting on Monday of the Julian calendar.

== Events ==
=== January–March ===
- January 18 – The Order of Our Lady of Bethlehem is founded by Pope Pius II, to defend the island of Lemnos.
- February 3 – The coronation of François II as Duke of the semi-independent Duchy of Brittany takes place in Nantes.
- February 27 – Frederick III, Holy Roman Emperor and Archduke of Austria, proclaims himself to be rightful King of Hungary and prepares to invade the kingdom in order to overthrow King Mathias Corvinus.
- March 4 – Austrian troops, on orders of Frederick III, invade Hungary, starting the Austrian–Hungarian War. The war continues for three years before the Austrians withdraw in 1462.

=== April–June ===
- April 8 – Stefan Branković, despot of Serbia, is overthrown by King Stefan Tomaš of Bosnia, who installs his son, Stephen Tomašević as the new despot.
- April 24 – The Fra Mauro map of the world is completed by the Italian cartographers Fra Mauro and Andrea Bianco, who had been hired by the late King Afonso V of Portugal to produce an up-to-date geography for the use by explorers.
- April 25 – The Treaty of Eger is signed by representatives of the Kingdom of Bohemia and the Electorate of Saxony, setting a border that remains more than 500 years later as the border between the Czech Republic and Germany as running along the main ridge of the Ore Mountains from Eger to the River Elbe.
- May 3, Pope Pius II issues a papal bull to approve building the University of Valence in France. The university will exist for almost 240 years before being closed during the French Revolution.
- May 12 – In India, Rao Jodha, ruler of the Kingdom of Marwar (in the modern-day state of Rajasthan) selects the site of a new capital city, which will be named Jodhpur in his honor.
- May 27 – Pope Pius II arrives in Mantua in the Italian region of Lombardy as the guest of Ludovico III Gonzaga, Marquis of Mantua, in order to convene the Council of Mantua in hopes of organizing a crusade against the Ottoman Empire. Meetings begin on June 1 the Council continues for six months.
- June 20 – The Despotate of Serbia comes to an end as the despot Stefan Tomašević surrenders the last Serbian city, Smederevo, without a fight.

=== July–September ===
- July 2 – The Sultanate of Morocco renews its siege of Ksar es-Seghir (renamed Alcácer-Ceguer), which had been seized by the Kingdom of Portugal on October 24, 1458. The Portuguese Governor Duarte de Meneses leads the defense of the city against the attacks led by the Sultan Abd al-Haqq II, who calls off the siege after less than two months.
- August 24 – Morocco's Sultan Abd al-Haqq II ends his siege of the Portuguese fortress at Ksar es-Seghir.
- September 23 – Wars of the Roses: At the Battle of Blore Heath in the Kingdom of England, Yorkists under Richard Neville, 5th Earl of Salisbury, defeat a Lancastrian force.
- September 26 – Pope Pius II calls upon the participants of at the Council of Mantua to fund and participate in a Christian crusade to recapture Constantinople from the Muslim Ottomans, who had seized it in 1453.

=== October–December ===
- October 12 – Wars of the Roses: With a royal force advancing on his fortress at Ludlow, Richard of York, 3rd Duke of York, flees to Ireland, while his ally Richard Neville, 16th Earl of Warwick (Warwick the Kingmaker, eldest son of the Earl of Salisbury) goes to Calais.
- November 12 – Pope Pius II issues the papal bull Inter Ceteras, founding the University of Basel in Switzerland, though the university does not begin operations until April 4 the following year.
- November 20 – In England, the "Parliament of Devils" (so called because it consists of Lancastrian supporters and Yorkist nobles are not invited) opens its session at Coventry in St Mary's Priory and Cathedral.
- December 20 – England's "Parliament of Devils" is dissolved after accomplishhing its purpose of passing bills of attainder for high treason, indictments of Richard of York, 3rd Duke of York and other Yorkist supporters in the War of the Roses. Other prominent Yorkists charged are Edward, Earl of March (the future King Edward IV), Edmund, Earl of Rutland, Richard Neville, 5th Earl of Salisbury, and his son, Richard Neville, 16th Earl of Warwick.

=== Date unknown ===
- The Wallachian town of Bucharest is first mentioned.
- Richard, Duke of York, Lord Lieutenant of Ireland, returns on a second visit to Ireland. The Irish Parliament, meeting at Drogheda, upholds his authority against Henry VI of England, and an English Act of Attainder.
- Richard Hygons, English composer, begins fifty years of service at Wells Cathedral.

=== Religion ===
- King Thomas of Bosnia forces the clergy of the Bosnian Church into exile.
- According to a legend, the wedding of Christian Rosenkreuz takes place.

== Births ==
- January 25 – Paul Hofhaimer, Austrian organist and composer (d. 1537)
- March 2 – Pope Adrian VI, Dutch-born churchman (d. 1523)
- March 6 – Jakob Fugger, German banker (d. 1525)
- March 22 – Maximilian I, Holy Roman Emperor (d. 1519)
- May 15 – John I, Count Palatine of Simmern (1480–1509) (d. 1509)
- July – Mingyi Nyo, founder of the Toungoo Dynasty of Burma (Myanmar) (d. 1530)
- July 11 – Kaspar, Count Palatine of Zweibrücken, German nobleman (d. 1527)
- October 6 – Martin Behaim, German explorer and cartographer (d. 1507)
- December 22 – Sultan Cem, pretender to the Ottoman throne (d. 1495)
- December 27 – King John I Albert of Poland (d. 1501)
- date unknown
  - Christina Brask, Swedish writer and translator (d. 1520)
  - Edward Poynings, Lord Deputy to King Henry VII of England (d. 1521)
- probable – Lorenzo di Credi, Florentine painter and sculptor (d. 1537)
- approximate
  - Jheronimus de Clibano, Dutch composer (d. 1503)
  - Jean Mouton, French composer (d. 1522)

== Deaths ==
- February 14 – Stephen, Count Palatine of Simmern-Zweibrücken (b. 1385)
- March 3 – Ausiàs March, Catalan poet from Valencia (b. 1397)
- May 2 – Antoninus of Florence, Italian archbishop (b. 1389)
- August 27 – James of Portugal, Portuguese cardinal (b. 1433)
- September 6 – Katharina of Nassau-Beilstein, German regent
- September 17 – Isabella of Urgell, Duchess of Coimbra, Portuguese Duchess (b. 1409)
- September 23 (killed at the Battle of Blore Heath):
  - James Tuchet, 5th Baron Audley (b. 1400)
  - Thomas Dutton, English knight (b. 1421)
- September 24 – Erik of Pomerania, King of Norway, Denmark and Sweden (b. 1382)
- October 30 – Gian Francesco Poggio Bracciolini, Italian humanist (b. 1380)
- November 5 – John Fastolf, English soldier
- December 4 – Adolf VIII, Duke of Southern Jutland (b. 1401)
