= Margaret of Baden =

Margravine of Baden (1431–1457)

Margarete of Baden
- Born: 1431
- Died: 24 October 1457 (aged 25–26); Ansbach
- Noble family: House of Zähringen
- Spouse: Albert III Achilles, Elector of Brandenburg
- Issue: Ursula; Elisabeth; Margareta; John Cicero, Elector of Brandenburg
- Father: Jacob, Margrave of Baden-Baden
- Mother: Catherine of Lorraine

Margaret of Baden (1431 – 24 October 1457) was a Margravine of Baden by birth and by marriage Margravine of Brandenburg-Ansbach and Brandenburg-Kulmbach. She was the daughter of Jacob, Margrave of Baden-Baden, and his wife Catherine of Lorraine.

In 1446, Margaret married Albert of Brandenburg, the future Albert III Achilles, Elector of Brandenburg, in Heilsbronn. Margaret died before he succeeded to the Electorate of Brandenburg, thus never served as Electress. Their marriage produced three sons and three daughters:

- Ursula (1450–1508)

married in 1467 Duke Henry I of Münsterberg-Oels (1448-1498)

- Elisabeth (1451–1524)

married in 1467 Duke Eberhard II of Württemberg (1447-1504)

- Margaret (1453–1509), abbess of the Poor Clares convent at Hof from 1476
- John Cicero (1455–1499), Elector of Brandenburg

Margaret died in Ansbach in 1457 shortly after her husband acquired the Margraviate of Brandenburg-Kulmbach.

Margaret of Baden House of Zähringen Born: 1431 Died: 24 October 1457
German nobility
Vacant Title last held by Elisabeth of Bavaria	Margravine of Brandenburg-Ansbach; 12 November 1446 – 24 October 1457	Vacant Title next held by Anna of Saxony
Preceded by Barbara of Saxe-Witternberg	Margravine of Brandenburg-Kulmbach; 1457	Vacant Title next held by Anna of Saxony
