= 1486 imperial election =

Holy Roman imperial election

- 16 February 1486

7 Prince-electors 4 votes needed to win
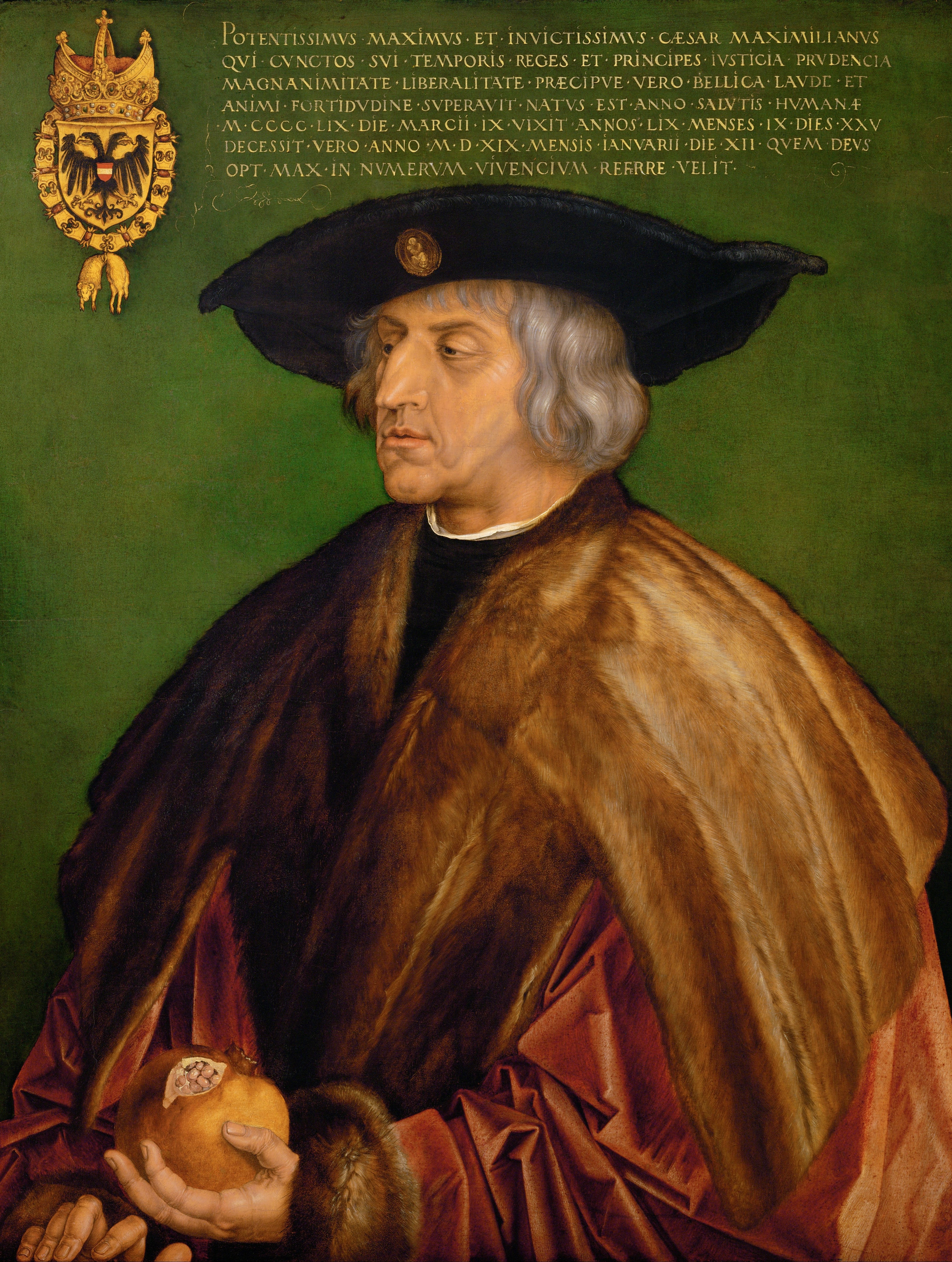
Candidate	Maximilian I
House	Habsburg
Electoral vote	7
Percentage	100%
King before election
Frederick III
House of Habsburg
Elected King
Maximilian I
House of Habsburg

The imperial election of 1486 was an imperial election held on 16 February 1486 in Frankfurt to select the King of the Romans, the designated successor to Holy Roman Emperor Frederick III. All seven prince-electors voted unanimously to elect Frederick's son Maximilian I of the House of Habsburg. Frederick III died on August 19, 1493, at which point Maximilian assumed the title King of the Romans; he later claimed the title of Holy Roman Emperor in 1508 without a papal coronation, a precedent that was subsequently accepted by Pope Julius II.

== Background ==
Frederick III called for the election of his successor. The prince-electors called to Frankfurt for this occasion were:

- Berthold von Henneberg, elector of Mainz
- John II of Baden, elector of Trier
- Hermann IV of Hesse, elector of Cologne
- Vladislaus II of Hungary, king of Bohemia
- Philip, elector of the Electoral Palatinate
- Ernest, elector of Saxony
- Albrecht III Achilles, elector of Brandenburg

Frederick's son Maximilian I, Holy Roman Emperor was elected to succeed his father.

== Aftermath ==
Frederick died on August 19, 1493. As per custom, Maximilian took the title King of the Romans on his father's death; the title Holy Roman Emperor was traditionally bestowed by the pope following a coronation in Rome.

In 1489, Pope Innocent VIII, in conflict with King Ferdinand I of Naples, over Ferdinand's refusal to pay feudal dues to the papacy, had excommunicated and deposed him by a papal bull of September 11. Innocent then offered Naples to King Charles VIII of France, who had a remote claim to its throne because his grandfather, Charles VII of France, had married Marie of Anjou of the House of Valois-Anjou, the ruling family of Naples at the time of their marriage in 1422. Innocent later settled his quarrel with Ferdinand and revoked the bans before dying in 1492, but the offer to Charles remained an apple of discord in Italian politics. Ferdinand died on January 25, 1494, and was succeeded by his son Alfonso II of Naples.

On March 16, 1494, Maximilian married Bianca Maria Sforza. In October he granted her uncle, Ludovico Sforza, the ducal title in Milan. Ludovico Sforza's title was immediately challenged by Alfonso, who also had a claim to it. To answer this threat, Ludovico Sforza invited Charles to take up Innocent's offer. The French invasion sparked a series of conflicts, the Italian Wars, among the states in Italy which made it impossible for Maximilian to travel to Rome. On February 4, 1508 at Trento, he claimed for himself the title of Electus Romanorum Imperator, Elected Roman Emperor, which was subsequently accepted on February 12 by Pope Julius II. Subsequent electees retained the right to call themselves Holy Roman Emperor without being crowned by the pope.
