= Frederick I of Brandenburg-Ansbach =

Frederick I
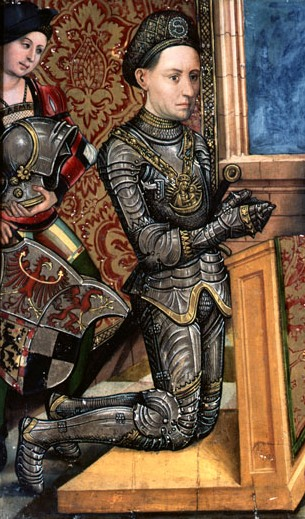

Margrave of Brandenburg-Ansbach
- Reign: 1486–1536
- Predecessor: Albert III
- Successor: George

Margrave of Brandenburg-Kulmbach
- Reign: 1495–1515
- Predecessor: Siegmund
- Successor: Kasimir
- Born: 8 May 1460; Ansbach
- Died: 4 April 1536 (aged 75); Ansbach
- Spouse: Sophia of Poland (m. 1479; died 1512)
- Issue: Casimir, Margrave of Brandenburg-Kulmbach Margarete of Brandenburg-Ansbach; George, Margrave of Brandenburg-Ansbach; Sofie, Duchess of Legnica; Anna, Duchess of Cieszyn; Albert, 1st Duke of Prussia; Johann, Viceroy of Valencia; Elisabeth, Margravine of Baden-Durlach; Barbara, Landgravine of Leuchtenberg; Frederick of Brandenburg-Ansbach Wilhelm, Archbishop of Riga; John Albert, Archbishop of Magdeburg; Gumprecht of Brandenburg-Ansbach
- House: Hohenzollern
- Father: Albert III, Margrave of Brandenburg
- Mother: Anna of Saxony

Frederick I of Ansbach and Bayreuth (also known as Frederick V; German: Friedrich V. von Brandenburg-Ansbach-Kulmbach or Friedrich der Ältere; 8 May 1460 – 4 April 1536) was born at Ansbach as the eldest son of Albert III, Margrave of Brandenburg, and Anna, daughter of Frederick II, Elector of Saxony. His elder half-brother was Elector John Cicero of Brandenburg. Friedrich succeeded his father as Margrave of Ansbach in 1486 and his younger brother Siegmund as Margrave of Bayreuth in 1495.

After depleting the finances of the margraviate with his lavish lifestyle, Frederick I was deposed by his two elder sons, Casimir and George, in 1515. He was then locked up at Plassenburg Castle by his eldest son Casimir in a tower room from which he could not escape for 12 years. Thereupon, his son Casimir took up the rule of the Margraviate of Bayreuth (Kulmbach) and his son George took up the rule of the Margraviate of Ansbach. However, the overthrow of Frederick did outrage his other younger sons and led to far-reaching political countermeasures. When Elector Joachim I of Brandenburg visited Kulmbach during his journey to Augsburg, and wanted to plead for Frederick's release, he was nevertheless denied entry to Plassenburg Castle. The dispute was finally cleared when an agreement was reached in 1522, in which the demands of the younger sons of Frederick were met.

== Family and children ==
On 14 February 1479, at Frankfurt (Oder), Frederick I was married to Princess Sophia of Poland (6 April 1464 – 5 October 1512), daughter of King Casimir IV of Poland by his wife Elisabeth of Austria, and sister of King Sigismund I of Poland. They had seventeen children:

1. Casimir, Margrave of Brandenburg-Kulmbach (27 September 1481, Ansbach – 21 September 1527, Buda).
2. Elisabeth, died young.
3. Margarete of Brandenburg-Ansbach-Kulmbach (10 January 1483, Ansbach – 10 July 1532).
4. George, Margrave of Brandenburg-Ansbach (4 March 1484, Ansbach – 27 December 1543, Ansbach).
5. Sophie of Brandenburg-Ansbach-Kulmbach (10 March 1485, Ansbach – 24 May 1537, Liegnitz), married on 14 November 1518 to Duke Frederick II of Legnica.
6. Anna of Brandenburg-Ansbach-Kulmbach (5 May 1487, Ansbach – 7 February 1539), married on 1 December 1518 to Duke Wenceslaus II of Cieszyn.
7. Barbara, died young.
8. Albert, 1st Duke of Prussia (17 May 1490, Ansbach – 20 March 1568, Castle Tapiau), Grand Master of the Teutonic Order from 1511 to 1525, and first Duke of Prussia from 1525.
9. Frederick of Brandenburg-Ansbach-Kulmbach (13 June 1491, Ansbach – ca. 1497).
10. Johann, Viceroy of Valencia (9 January 1493, Plassenburg – 5 July 1525, Valencia)
11. Elisabeth of Brandenburg-Ansbach-Kulmbach (25 March 1494, Ansbach – 31 May 1518, Pforzheim), married in Pforzheim on 29 September 1510 to Margrave Ernest of Baden-Durlach
12. Barbara of Brandenburg-Ansbach-Kulmbach (24 September 1495, Ansbach – 23 September 1552), married in Plassenburg on 26 July 1528 to Landgrave George III of Leuchtenberg.
13. Frederick of Brandenburg-Ansbach-Kulmbach (17 January 1497, Ansbach – 20 August 1536, Genoa), a canon in Würzburg and Salzburg.
14. Wilhelm, Archbishop of Riga (30 June 1498, Ansbach – 4 February 1563, Riga)
15. John Albert, Archbishop of Magdeburg (20 September 1499, Ansbach – 17 May 1550, Halle)
16. Frederick Albert, died young.
17. Gumprecht of Brandenburg-Ansbach-Kulmbach (16 July 1503, Ansbach – 25 June 1528, Naples), a canon in Bamberg.

== Sources ==
- Hohkamp, Michaela (2007). "Sisters, Aunts, and Cousins: Familial Architectures and the Political Field in Early Modern Europe". In Sabean, David Warren; Mathieu, Jon; Teuscher, Simon (eds.). Kinship in Europe: Approaches to Long-Term Development (1300-1900). Berghahn Books. ISBN 9780857456861.
- Ward, A.W.; Prothero, G.W.; Leathes, Stanley, eds. (1934). The Cambridge Modern History. Vol. XIII. Cambridge at the University Press.

Frederick I of Brandenburg-Ansbach House of Hohenzollern Born: 8 May 1460 Died: 4 April 1536
| Preceded by Albrecht Achilles | Margrave of Brandenburg-Ansbach; 1486–1536 | Succeeded by Georg |
| Preceded by Siegmund | Margrave of Brandenburg-Kulmbach; 1495–1515 | Succeeded by Kasimir |
