= Elisabeth of Brandenburg, Duchess of Württemberg =

Elizabeth of Brandenburg-Ansbach
- Born: 29 November 1451; Ansbach, Margraviate of Brandenburg-Ansbach
- Died: 28 March 1524 (aged 72); Nürtingen, Duchy of Württemberg
- Noble family: House of Hohenzollern
- Spouse: Eberhard II, Duke of Württemberg
- Father: Albrecht III Achilles, Elector of Brandenburg
- Mother: Margaret of Baden

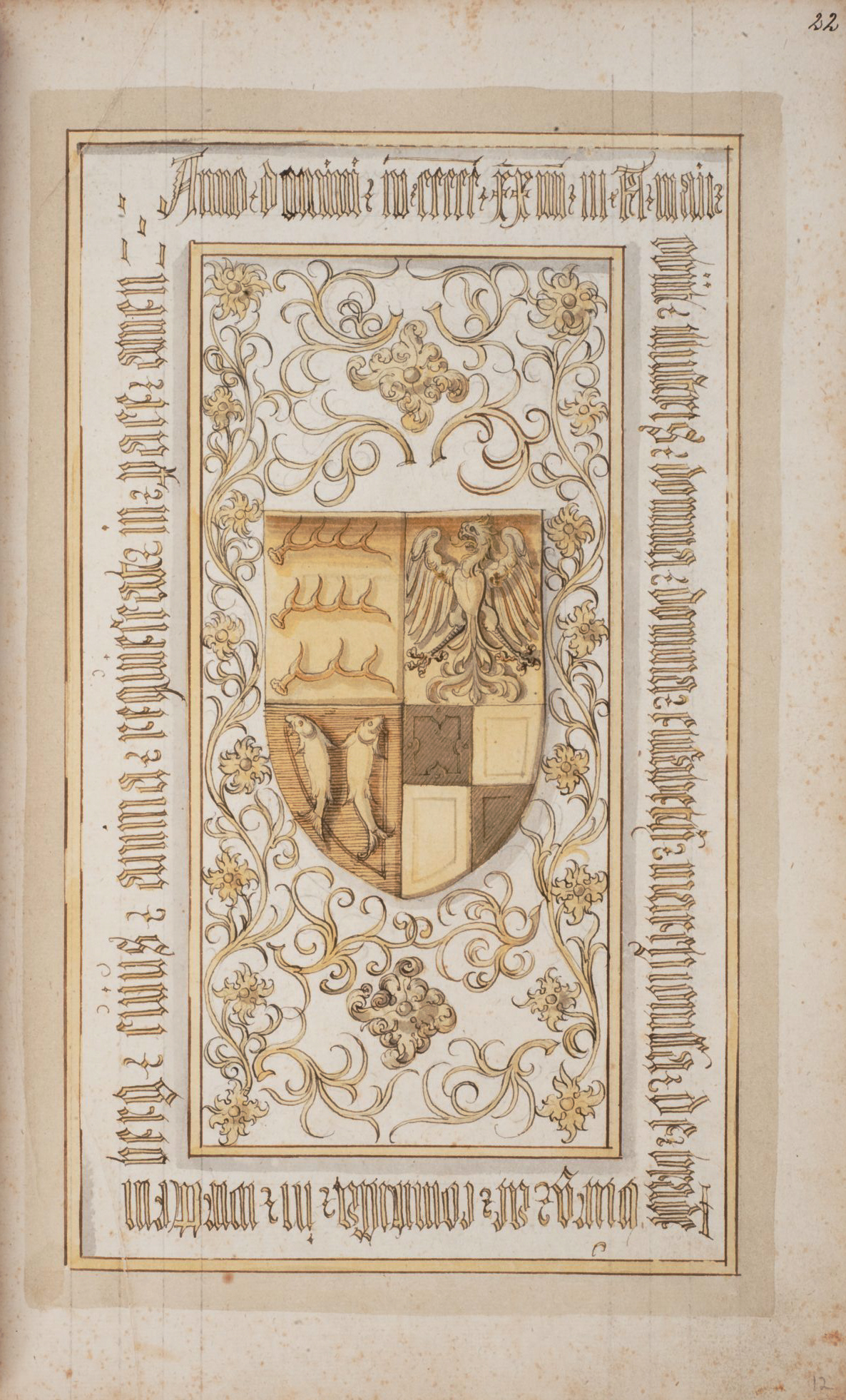
Epitaph in the manuscript Memoriae posteritatique inclytae domus Wirtembergicae sacrum of 1583

Elizabeth of Brandenburg-Ansbach (29 November 1451, Ansbach – 28 March 1524, Nürtingen) was a princess of Brandenburg by birth and by marriage Duchess of Württemberg.

== Life ==
Elizabeth was the second daughter of the Elector Albrecht III Achilles of Brandenburg (1414–1486) from his first marriage to Margaret of Baden (1431–1457).

In April or May 1467 she married in Stuttgart Count Eberhard II of Württemberg (1447–1504). Through the marriage of his daughter, Albrecht Achilles was able to exert considerable influence on his son-in-law. Elizabeth's husband was raised to a Duke of Württemberg in 1496. The marriage was childless and was a very unhappy one. Elizabeth spent a lot of time at her father's court. Eberhard abdicated on 11 June 1498 in Horb am Neckar in favor of his nephew Ulrich to the duchy, with an agreement that Ulrich would provide Elisabeth with an income befitting a duchess.

Unlike her husband, Elisabeth was not expelled from Württemberg, instead the agreement signed at Horb am Neckar carried an obligation for the new ruler to provide for her maintenance. She retired in 1499 to her widow seat at Nürtingen castle, where she led a pious and charitable life. She did much to help rebuild the town of Nürtingen, which had burned down twenty years earlier.

== References and sources ==
- Dieter Stievermann, in: Sönke Lorenz, Dieter Mertens, Volker Press (eds.): Das Haus Württemberg. Ein biographisches Lexikon, Kohlhammer Verlag, Stuttgart, 1997, ISBN 3-17-013605-4, p. 100
- Chr. Dinkel: Chronik und Beschreibung der Stadt Nürtingen, P. Frasch, 1847, p. 77
