= Monk of Heilsbronn =

14th-century German writer

The Monk of Heilsbronn (German: Mönch von Heilsbronn) was the anonymous author of some short mystical treatises, written about the beginning of the fourteenth century, at the Cistercian Abbey of Heilsbronn, in Bavaria.

The Monk cites St. Bonaventure and Albert the Great (d. 1280) and draws largely on the works of Conrad of Brundelsheim (Soccus), Abbot of Heilsbronn in 1303 (d. 1321). His mystical conceptions show a close relation to Bernard of Clairvaux and Hugo of St. Victor.

The date of the composition of the treatises is determined by these borrowings and quotations; they are written in Middle German with some traces of the Bavarian dialect.

== Book of the Seven Degrees ==
The first, in verse, is "The Book of the Seven Degrees" (Das Buch der siben Grade), which comprises 2218 lines, and has only been preserved in the manuscript of Heidelberg, transcribed in 1390 by a priest, Ulric Currifex of Eschenbach. In it the author, taking as his starting point the vision of Ezechiel (xl, 22), describes the seven degrees which make the pure soul mount up to the realms of heaven: prayer, penitence, charity, the habitual thought of God, with the devotion, which purifies and which ravishes, union and conformity with God, contemplation of God. The author may have utilized a treatise of the same nature attributed to David of Augsburg.

In 2019, an issue of "The Book of the Seven Degrees" was discovered in the Badische Landesbibliothek in Karlsruhe. Dated 1335–1340 by paper-analysis and existing watermark, the 179-page script is said to be the oldest paper manuscript fully written in the German language ever found.

== Liber de corpore et sanguine Domini ==
The other work is in prose, with a prologue and epilogue in verse. In this prologue, the author identifies himself as a "Monk of Heilsbronn" (einem Muniche von Hailsprunne) and asks the prayers of the reader. The title of the treatise is the "Liber de corpore et sanguine Domini" (or "Das Puch on den VI namen des Fronleichnams", or also the "Goldene Zunge").

In this treatise, the Monk discusses six different names given to the Blessed Sacrament: Eucharist, Gift, Food, Communion, Sacrifice, Sacrament. He gives the reasons for these names and suggests considerations on the Divine love, union with God, etc., especially when speaking of the second and the sixth names. He cites Bernard of Clairvaux, whom he calls "his father", very frequently, as well as (less frequently+ Augustine of Hippo and Gregory the Great.

== Other works ==
A third work, "On Love" (Das Puch von der Minne), if it ever existed, has not been recovered.

Two other treatises which are found in the manuscript of Heidelberg have been attributed to the same author. The first of these is "The Daughter of Sion" (Tochter Syon), a short poem of 596 lines, in the Alamannian dialect, rich in matter and full of emotion; it treats of the mystical union of the soul with God, a common theme in the poetry of the thirteenth and fourteenth centuries. The second work (von Sante Alexis) tells in 456 lines the well-known legend of St. Alexis.

However, due to peculiarities of language, rhyme, and verse, together with the conceptual framework demonstrated, other authors question the identification of the "Monk of Heilsbronn" as the author of these two poems.
