= Heilsbronn Abbey =

Cistercian monastery in Germany

Coordinates: 49°20′16″N 10°47′31″E

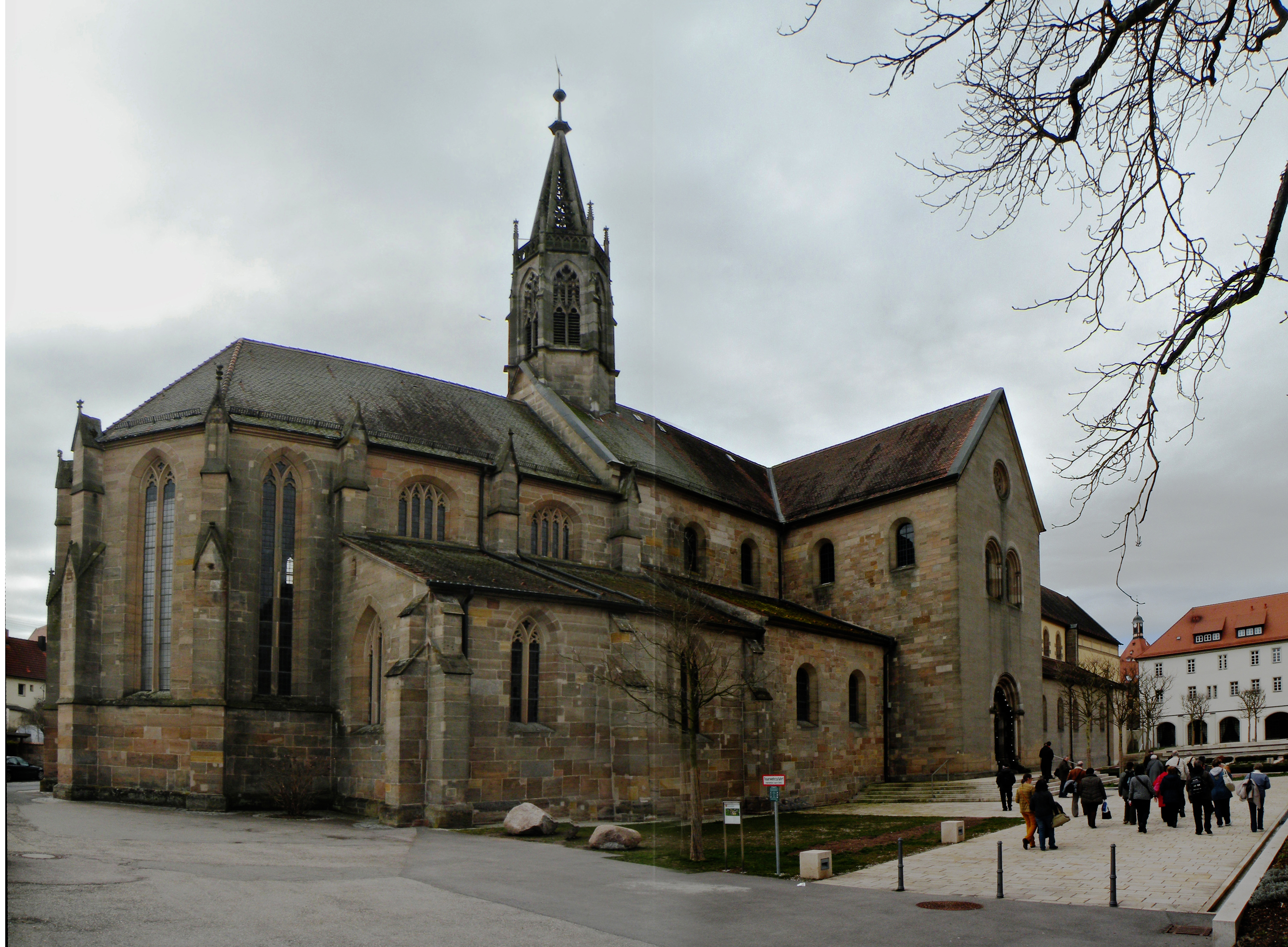
The Heilsbronn Münster

Heilsbronn Abbey was a Cistercian monastery at Heilsbronn in the district of Ansbach in Middle Franconia, Bavaria, Germany. It was part of the Diocese of Eichstätt.

== History ==
It was founded in 1132–33 by Saint Otto of Bamberg and was settled by monks from Ebrach Abbey, under the first abbot Rapotho. It was one of the wealthiest monasteries of Germany, with possessions around Franconia as far as Regensburg and in Württemberg. These rich endowments were mostly made by the dukes of Abenberg and their heirs, the Hohenzollern Burgraves of Nuremberg. It was the hereditary burial-place of the Hohenzollern family and ten burgraves of Nuremberg, five margraves and three electors of Brandenburg, besides many other persons of note, were buried here.

== Reformation and dissolution ==
Heilsbronn was a flourishing monastery until the time of the Reformation. In 1530 Abbot John Schopper (1529–1540) founded a monastic school here, which later became a Protestant school for princes, and the doctrines of Luther gradually found favour in the monastery. His successor, Sebastian Wagner, openly supported Protestantism. He married and resigned in 1543. In 1549 Roman Catholicism was restored at Heilsbronn, but only ostensibly, and the abbey seems to have ceased to be a Catholic house in 1555, although it existed for some years longer. The last abbot who made any pretense of Catholic belief was Melchior Wunderer (1562–1578). The five succeeding abbots were Protestants, and in 1631 Heilsbronn ceased to be an abbey. Its valuable library was transferred to Erlangen.

== Buildings ==
The buildings of the monastery have mostly disappeared, with the exception of the fine church, known as Münster Heilsbronn, a Romanesque basilica, restored between 1851 and 1866, and possessing paintings by Albrecht Dürer.

== Burials ==
- Albrecht III Achilles, Elector of Brandenburg
- Anna of Saxony, Electress of Brandenburg
- Barbara of Brandenburg (1464–1515)

== The Monk of Heilsbronn ==
The Monk of Heilsbronn was a didactic poet of the 14th century, author of the works Sieben Graden, Tochter Syon and Leben des heiligen Alexius.
