= Margaret of Brandenburg (1453–1509) =

Abbess of the Poor Clares monastery at Hof

- Born: 18 April 1453
- Died: 27 April 1509 (aged 56); Hof
- Noble family: House of Hohenzollern
- Father: Albrecht III Achilles, Elector of Brandenburg
- Mother: Margaret of Baden

Margaret of Brandenburg (18 April 1453 – 27 April 1509, Hof) was a princess of Brandenburg by birth and abbess of the Poor Clares monastery at Hof from 1476 to 1490.

== Life ==
Margaret was the third daughter of the Elector Albrecht III Achilles, Elector of Brandenburg of Brandenburg (1414–1486) from his first marriage to Margaret of Baden (1431–1457).

She was initially intended for the monastic life. After her mother's death, however, Margaret was betrothed to Count Palatine Kaspar of Zweibrücken. But then Margaret fell dangerously ill and decided to dissolve her betrothal and become a nun after all. Her younger half-sister Amalie was then betrothed to Kasper and married him in 1478.

In 1476, Margaret succeeded Catherine of Kotzau as abbess of the Poor Clares monastery at Hof. In 1490, she abdicated and was succeeded by Agnes of Hirschberg. She spent the rest of her life in the monastery as a nun. She owned some land and in 1499, she created an urbarium.

== References and sources ==
- Friedrich Ebert: Chronik der Stadt Hof, vol. VI, Hof, 1966. p. 319.
- Julius von Minutoli: Das kaiserliche Buch des Markgrafen Albrecht Achilles, Schneider, 1850, p. 487 (Digitized)

== Footnotes ==
Margaret of Brandenburg (1453–1509) House of Hohenzollern Born: 18 April 1453 Died: 27 April 1509
Preceded by Catherine of Kotzau	Abbess of the monastery at Hof; 1476–1490	Succeeded by Agnes of Hirschberg
