= Siegmund, Margrave of Bayreuth =

Siegmund, Margrave of Brandenburg-Bayreuth
- Born: 27 September 1468; Ansbach
- Died: 26 February 1495 (aged 26); Ansbach
- Noble family: House of Hohenzollern
- Father: Albert III, Margrave of Brandenburg
- Mother: Anna of Saxony

Siegmund of Brandenburg-Bayreuth (27 September 1468, in Ansbach– 26 February 1495, in Ansbach) was the sixth, but third surviving, son of Albrecht III, Margrave of Brandenburg, Ansbach and Bayreuth. His mother was his father's second wife, Anna of Saxony. On the death of his father on 11 March 1486, his elder brothers Johann Cicero and Friedrich succeeded to Brandenburg and Ansbach respectively, and Siegmund succeeded to Bayreuth. He never married, and at his death Bayreuth passed to his elder brother Frederick I of Ansbach.

== See also ==
- Franconia

Siegmund, Margrave of Bayreuth Brandenburg-Kulmbach Cadet branch of the House of Hohenzollern Born: 27 September 1468 Died: 26 February 1495
Preceded by Albert Achilles	Margrave of Brandenburg-Kulmbach; 1486–1495	Succeeded by Frederick I
