= Veldenz Castle =

Saarland Castle

- Burg Veldenz
- Nohfelden
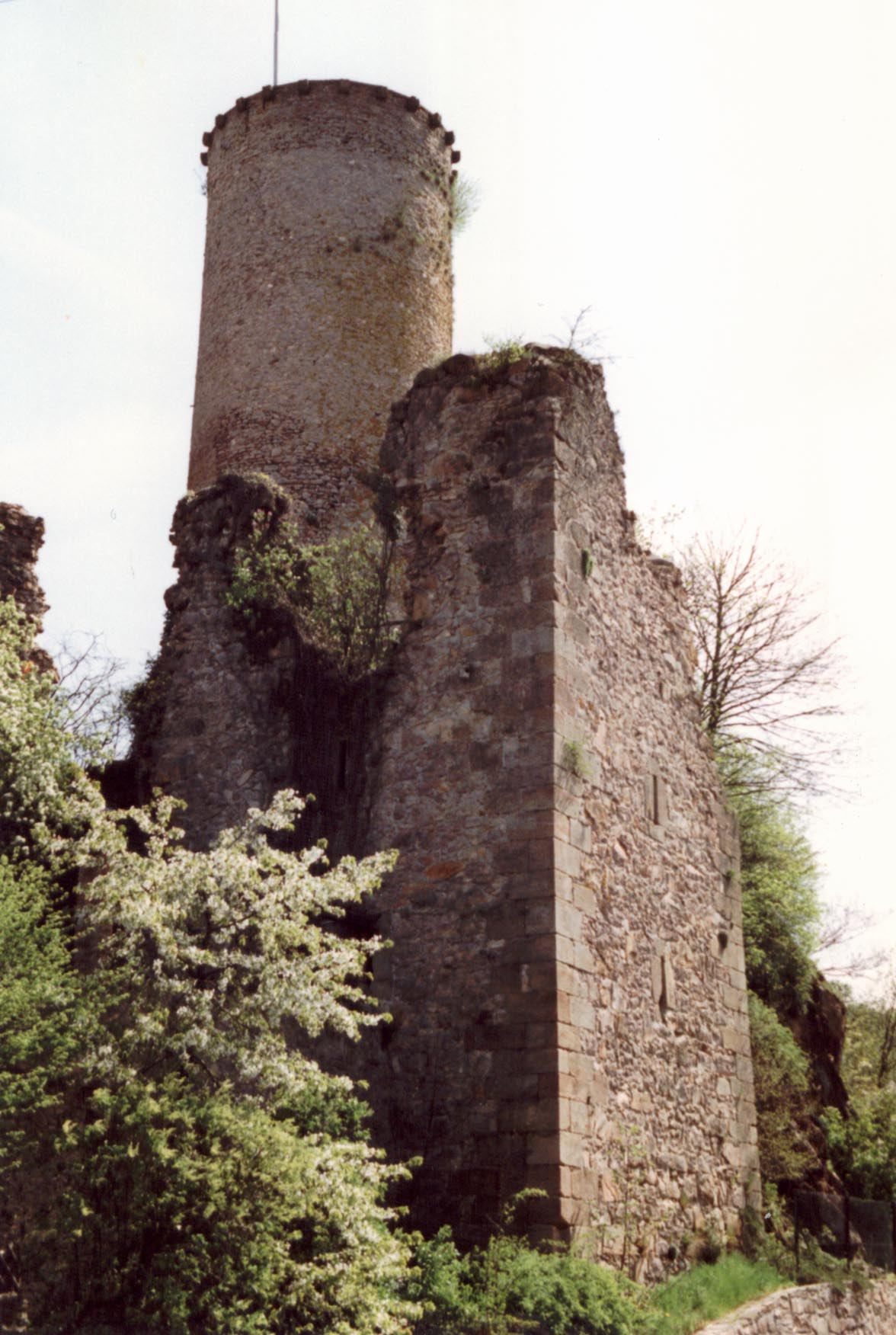
- Ruins of the Veldenz Castle wall and keep (1992)

Site information
- Type: hilltop castle
- Owner: Municipality of Nohfelden
- Open to the public: yes
- Condition: Ruins; the keep and the outer walls still stand

Location
- Location of Veldenz Castle within Saarland, Germany
- Coordinates: 49.587°N 7.144°E

Site history
- Built: c. 1285
- Built by: Count William Bossel II of Stein

Veldenz Castle was built on a spur above the village of Nohfelden in Landkreis Sankt Wendel in the northeast of Saarland, Germany.

== History ==
The hill castle is first mentioned in 1285, in a document stipulating that its builder, Count William Bossel II of Stein from Oberstein an der Nahe had to allow his liege lord, the Count of Veldenz to use the castle in case of war or a feud. In a contract dated 30 December 1285, he agreed to grant the Count of Veldenz Öffnungsrecht (the right to use the castle in times of war or feud), formalising a feudal relationship. The Lernortbeschreibung of the Burg Nohfelden explicitly describes this agreement and names Wilhelm as a member of the younger line of the “older family” of the Lords of Oberstein.

The Dukes of Palatinate-Zweibrücken acquired the Lordship of Nohfelden, including Veldenz Castle, in the middle of the 15th century. The castle served in 1490 as the stage for one of the saddest chapters in the history of Palatinate-Zweibrücken: after the death of Duke Louis the Black, his sons Kaspar and Alexander ruled the duchy jointly for a year. Then Alexander had his older brother locked up in the castle, claiming that Kaspar was mad. Kaspar remained locked up in Veldenz castle until his death in 1527, even after Alexander's death.

The castle was frequently damaged in the many wars of the 17th century, but was repaired equally often. In 1661, Duke Frederick of Zweibrücken-Veldenz died at the castle.

In 1804 the castle was nationalized by the French state, then sold off to the Cetto brothers from Sankt Wendel. They used the castle as a source of building materials.

== Architecture and grounds ==
Veldenz Castle (Burg Nohfelden) is situated on a roughly 100-metre-long mountain spur above the Nahe valley. The ruins are dominated by a round bergfried and remnants of the outer curtain walls.

=== Keep (Bergfried) ===
The bergfried rises to approximately 20–21 metres and is of circular plan, constructed from masonry typical of late 13th-century fortifications. Its original roof is no longer present, but an observation platform near the top allows panoramic views over Nohfelden and the surrounding Nahe valley. The tower's design emphasizes defensive strength, with limited access and thick walls characteristic of a strongpoint rather than a residential structure.

=== Palas (Residential building) ===
Beneath the bergfried lies the vaulted cellar of the former palas, measuring approximately 30 metres long and 12 metres wide. Archaeological studies indicate that above this basement, a multi-storey residential hall once existed, though only its foundations and lower masonry survive. These spaces likely housed the lord's household and contained storerooms, living quarters, and service areas.

=== Walls, layout, and defensive structures ===
The castle is enclosed by substantial curtain walls, many of which remain intact. The original layout included defensive gates and towers, forming a compact spur castle typical of the region. Modern conservation efforts have added metal stairways and a lift connecting the town to the castle plateau, improving visitor access to the bergfried and courtyard.

Vaulted chambers within the palas include individual rooms and a well, reflecting the functional organization and self-sufficiency of the castle during its medieval occupation.

=== Modern access and visitor facilities ===
Today, Veldenz Castle is owned and maintained by the municipality of Nohfelden. The bergfried is accessible to visitors from April to October, with an observation platform offering panoramic views of the Nahe valley. Guided tours can be arranged through the local tourist office.

A modern lift connects the town level to the castle plateau, improving accessibility for visitors. Metal stairways and walkways provide safe access to the bergfried and remaining courtyard areas. The castle grounds include the excavated palas basement, which is open to the public and showcases the vaulted chambers and well that formed part of the medieval residential and defensive complex.
