= Heilsbronn =

- Town
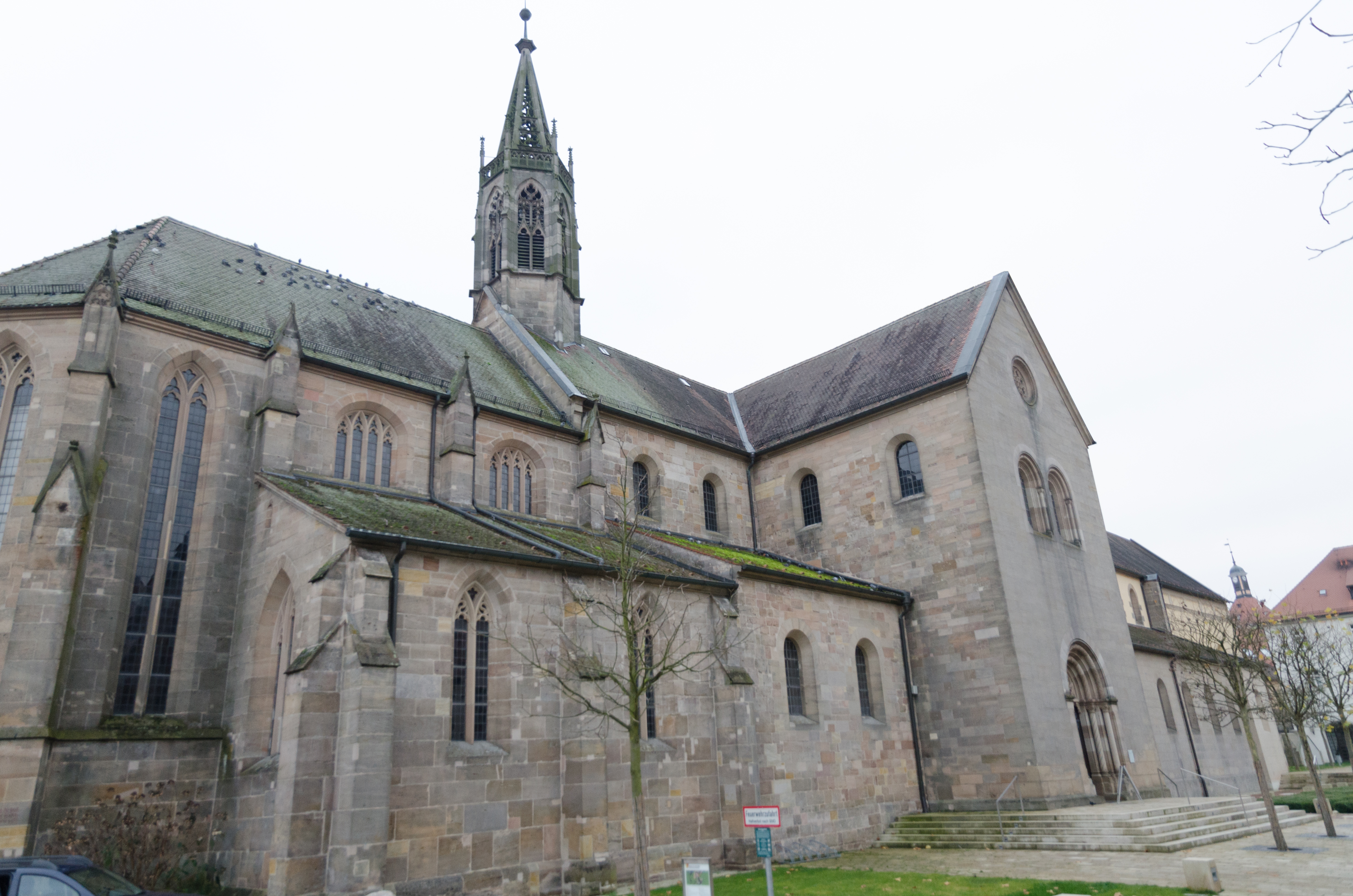
- Church of Saint Mary and Saint James at the Heilsbronn Abbey

- Coat of arms

- Location of Heilsbronn within Ansbach district
- Interactive map of Heilsbronn
- Location within Germany Location within Bavaria
- Coordinates: 49°20′19″N 10°47′27″E
- Country: Germany
- State: Bavaria
- Admin. region: Mittelfranken
- District: Ansbach
- Subdivisions: 18 Ortsteile

Government
  - Mayor (2026–): Eva Didion (SPD)

Area
  - Total: 62.23 km^{2} (24.03 sq mi)
- Elevation: 400 m (1,300 ft)

Population (2025-12-31)
  - Total: 9,762
  - Density: 156.9/km^{2} (406.3/sq mi)
- Time zone: UTC+01:00 (CET)
  - Summer (DST): UTC+02:00 (CEST)
- Postal codes: 91560
- Dialling codes: 09872
- Vehicle registration: AN
- Website: www.heilsbronn.de

Heilsbronn (German pronunciation: [haɪlsˈbʁɔn]) is a town in the Ansbach district of the Mittelfranken administrative region of Franconia, in the German state of Bavaria between Nuremberg and Ansbach, in the wooded valley of the Rangau. Its hallmark is the Katharinenturm, a medieval tower.

Heilsbronn should not be confused with the far larger city of Heilbronn, which lies 130 km further west.

== Heilsbronn Abbey ==
In the Middle Ages it was the seat of one of the great monasteries of Germany, with possessions around Franconia as far as Regensburg and in Württemberg. It was founded in 1132 and continued to exist until 1555. Its sepulchral monuments, many of which are figured by Hocker, Heilsbronnischer Antiquitätenschatz (Ansbach, 1731-1740), are of exceptionally high artistic interest. It was the hereditary burial-place of the Hohenzollern family and ten burgraves of Nuremberg, five margraves and three electors of Brandenburg, and many other persons of note are buried within its walls.

The Monk of Heilsbronn is the ordinary appellation of a didactic poet of the 14th century, whose Sieben Graden, Tochter Syon and Leben des heiligen Alexius were published by J. F. L. T. Merzdorf at Berlin in 1870.
