= Anna of Saxony, Electress of Brandenburg =

Electress consort of Brandenburg from 1458 to 1486

Anna of Saxony
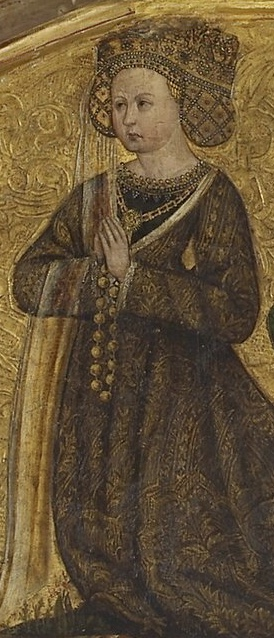
- Portrait (c. 1484) at St. Gumbertus, Ansbach

Electress consort of Brandenburg
- Tenure: 12 November 1458 – 11 March 1486
- Born: 7 March 1437; Meissen
- Died: 31 October 1512 (aged 75); Neustadt an der Aisch
- Spouse: Albert III Achilles (m. 1458; died 1486)
- Issue among others…: Frederick I; Amalie; Barbara; Sibylle; Siegmund
- House: House of Wettin
- Father: Frederick II, Elector of Saxony
- Mother: Margaret of Austria

Anna of Saxony (7 March 1437 – 31 October 1512) was a princess of Saxony by birth and an Electress of Brandenburg by her marriage to Albrecht III Achilles, Elector of Brandenburg.

== Life ==
Anna was a daughter of the Elector Frederick II of Saxony and Margaret of Austria, daughter of the Duke Ernest of Austria.

On 12 November 1458, Anna married Albert Achilles of Brandenburg, later Elector Albert III Achilles, in Ansbach. To further cement the tie between the House of Wettin and the House of Hohenzollern, the marriage contract also planned a marriage between Anna's brother Albert and Albert Achilles' daughter from his first marriage, Ursula, but both married children of King George of Poděbrady of Bohemia instead.

As her Wittum, Anna received Hoheneck Castle and district, plus Leutershausen and Colmberg. Through her marriage, she became stepmother to Albert Achilles's four children from his earlier marriage with Margaret of Baden. At the time of Anna's marriage, Albert Achilles held all the Franconian possessions of the Hohenzollerns. In 1470, he also inherited the Electorate of Brandenburg. In 1473, Anna agreed to a new House law, which made the Margraviate of Brandenburg indivisible but allowed the Franconian possessions to be shared among several sons. This meant that John Cicero, Albert Achilles's son from his first marriage, would become Elector of Brandenburg, but Anna's two sons would inherit the Frankish possessions.

Albert Achilles specified in his will that Anna was entitled to income and residency in Neustadt an der Aisch, Erlangen, Dachsbach, Baiersdorf and Liebenow. Her sons, however, would retain sovereignty over those territories. Anna survived her husband by 26 years and resided mostly in Neustadt an der Aisch, where she maintained a relatively luxurious court.

Anna died in 1512 and was buried in Heilsbronn Abbey. The memorial on her tomb was built in about 1502 and is still preserved.

== Issue ==
Anna and Albert Achilles had:

1. Frederick I (1460–1536), Margrave of Brandenburg-Ansbach-Kulmbach and Margrave of Brandenburg-Bayreuth, married in 1479 princess Sophia of Poland (1464–1512)
2. Amalie (1461–1481) married in 1478 Count Palatine Kaspar of Zweibrücken (1458–1527)
3. Anna (* / † 1462), died in infancy
4. Barbara (1464–1515) married firstly in 1472 Duke Henry XI of Crossen and Glogau (ca. 1430–1476); married secondly in 1476 King Vladislav II of Bohemia (1456–1516) (divorced in 1500)
5. Albert (* / † 1466), died in infancy
6. Sibylle (1467–1524) married in 1481 Duke Wilhelm IV of Jülich-Berg (1455–1511)
7. Siegmund (1468–1495), Margrave of Brandenburg-Kulmbach
8. Albert (* / † 1470), died in infancy
9. Dorothea (1471–1520), Abbess in Bamberg
10. George (1472–1476), died in childhood
11. Elisabeth (1474–1507) married in 1491, Count Hermann VIII of Henneberg-Aschach (1470–1535)
12. Magdalene (1476–1480), died in childhood
13. Anastasia (1478–1534) married in 1500 Count William IV of Henneberg-Schleusingen (1478–1559)

== Sources ==
- Hohkamp, Michaela (2007). "Sisters, Aunts, and Cousins: Familial Architectures and the Political Field in Early Modern Europe". In Sabean, David Warren; Mathieu, Jon; Teuscher, Simon (eds.). Kinship in Europe: Approaches to Long-Term Development (1300-1900). Berghahn Books. ISBN 9780857456861.
- Frederick Albert of Langenn: Duke Albrecht the Brave, the progenitor of the royal house of Saxony, p. 37 ff
- Daniel Martin Ernst Kirchner: The electresses and queens on the throne of the Hohenzollerns ..., Volume 1, 134 ff

Anna of Saxony, Electress of Brandenburg House of Wettin Born: 7 March 1437 Died: 31 October 1512
German nobility
Vacant Title last held by Catherine of Saxony	Electress consort of Brandenburg; 10 February 1471 – 11 March 1486	Succeeded by Margaret of Thuringia
Vacant Title last held by Catherine of Saxony	Margravine of Brandenburg; 10 February 1471 – 11 March 1486	Succeeded by Margaret of Thuringia
Vacant Title last held by Margaret of Baden	Margravine of Brandenburg-Ansbach; 12 November 1458 – 11 March 1486	Vacant Title next held by Sophia of Poland
Vacant Title last held by Margaret of Baden	Margravine of Brandenburg-Kulmbach; 12 November 1458 – 11 March 1486	Vacant Title next held by Sophia of Poland
