= Kaspar, Count Palatine of Zweibrücken =

- Born: 11 July 1459
- Died: 1527 (aged 67–68); Veldenz Castle, County Palatine of Veldenz
- Noble family: House of Wittelsbach
- Spouse: Amalie of Brandenburg
- Father: Louis I, Count Palatine of Zweibrücken
- Mother: Johanna of Croÿ

Kaspar, Count Palatine of Zweibrücken and Veldenz (11 July 1459 – c. Summer 1527) was Duke of Zweibrücken from 1489 to 1490.

== Life ==
He was the son of Louis I, Count Palatine of Zweibrücken and Johanna of Croÿ. In 1478 in Zweibrücken he married Amalie of Brandenburg (1461–1481), daughter of Albert III Achilles, Elector of Brandenburg. Amalie died shortly before her twentieth birthday. They had no children.

His father, Louis I, was afraid that after his death his dominions would be divided between his sons, with Kaspar receiving the County of Veldenz and his brother Alexander the Cripple receiving the Duchy of Zweibrücken. In order to prevent this, Louis ordered that after his death, his sons should rule the dominion jointly. However, just one year after Louis's death, Alexander had Kaspar arrested. Kaspar was declared mentally ill and incarcerated in Veldenz Castle. Henceforth, Alexander reigned alone.

Kaspar's dukedom was formally revoked in 1514. He remained incarcerated for the rest of his life. He died in the summer of 1527.

It cannot be determined conclusively whether Kaspar actually suffered mental or moral issues relevant to his duties as Duke, or whether he was moved out of the way by a power-hungry younger brother. Louis' decision that the brothers should jointly rule can be interpreted in different ways.

== Ancestors ==
Ancestors of Kaspar, Count Palatine of Zweibrücken

16. Rupert II, Elector Palatine
8. Rupert of Germany
17. Beatrice of Sicily (1326–1365)
4. Stephen, Count Palatine of Simmern-Zweibrücken
18. Frederick V, Burgrave of Nuremberg
9. Elisabeth of Nuremberg
19. Elisabeth of Meissen
2. Louis I, Count Palatine of Zweibrücken
20. Henry III of Veldenz
10. Frederick III of Veldenz
21. Loretta of Sponheim-Starkenburg
5. Anna of Veldenz
22. John I, Count of Nassau-Weilburg
11. Margaret of Nassau-Saarbrücken
23. Joanna of Saarbrücken
1. Kaspar, Count Palatine of Zweibrücken
24. Guillaume de Croÿ
12. Jean I de Croÿ
25. Isabeau de Renty
6. Antoine I de Croÿ
26. John I of Craon
13. Marie de Craon
27. Marie de Châtillon-sur-Marne
3. Johanna of Croÿ
28. Frederick of Lorraine, Count of Vaudémont
14. Antoine, Count of Vaudémont
29. Margaret of Joinville
7. Margaret of Lorraine-Vaudémont
30. John VII of Harcourt
15. Marie, Countess of Harcourt
31. Marie of Alençon

Kaspar, Count Palatine of Zweibrücken House of Wittelsbach Born: 11 July 1450 Died: Summer 1527
Preceded by Louis I, Count Palatine of Zweibrücken	Count Palatine of Zweibrücken; 1489–1490	Succeeded by Alexander
Preceded by Louis I, Count Palatine of Zweibrücken	Count of Veldenz; 1489–1490	Succeeded by Alexander
