= Albrecht III Achilles =

Elector of Brandenburg from 1471 to 1486

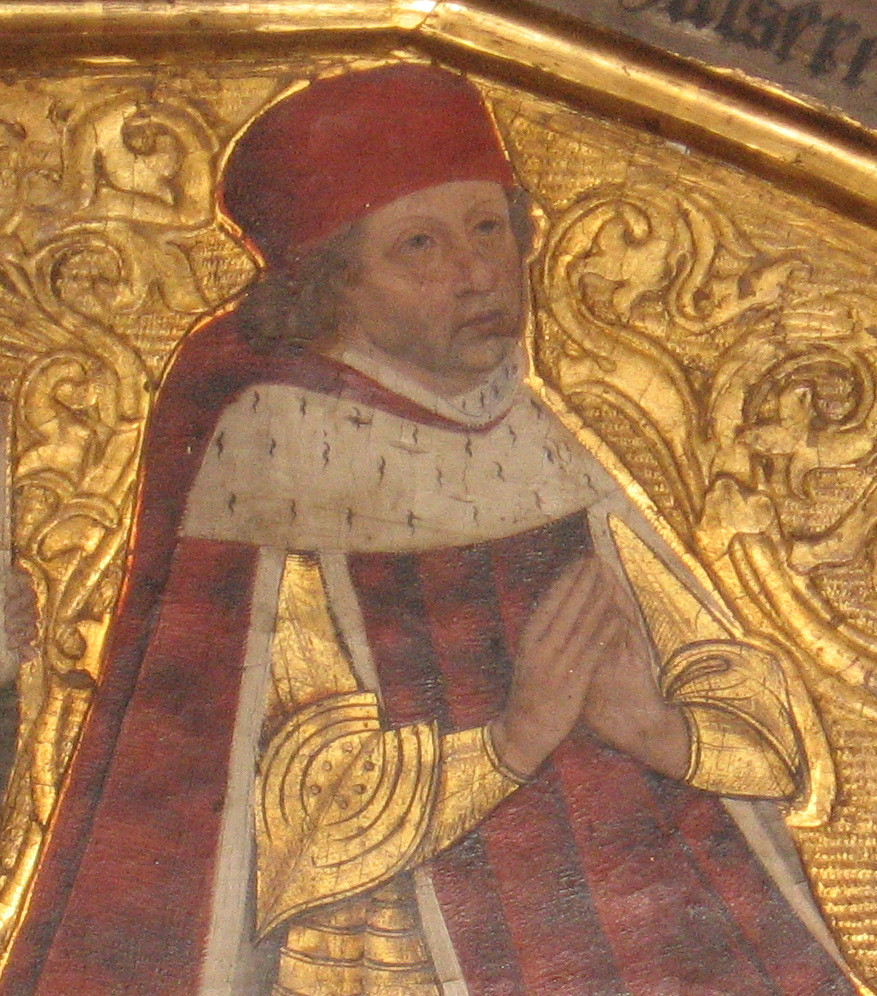
- Portrait of Albrecht Achilles, St. Gumbertus, Ansbach (1484)

Elector of Brandenburg
- Reign: 10 February 1471 – 11 March 1486
- Predecessor: Frederick II
- Successor: John Cicero
- Born: 9 November 1414; Tangermünde, Brandenburg
- Died: 11 March 1486 (aged 71); Imperial City of Frankfurt
- Burial: Heilsbronn Abbey
- Spouse: Margaret of Baden (m. 1446; died 1457) Anna of Saxony (m. 1458)
- Issue Detail: John Cicero, Elector of Brandenburg; Ursula; Elisabeth; Margareta; Frederick I; Amalie; Barbara; Sibylle; Siegmund
- House: Hohenzollern
- Father: Frederick I, Elector of Brandenburg
- Mother: Elisabeth of Bavaria-Landshut

Albrecht III (9 November 1414 – 11 March 1486) was Elector of Brandenburg from 1471 until his death, the third from the House of Hohenzollern. A member of the Order of the Swan, he received the cognomen Achilles because of his knightly qualities and virtues. He also ruled in the Franconian principalities of Ansbach from 1440 and Kulmbach from 1464 (as Albrecht I).

== Biography ==
=== Early life ===
Albrecht was born at the Brandenburg residence of Tangermünde as the third son of the Nuremberg burgrave Frederick I and his wife, the Wittelsbach princess Elisabeth of Bavaria-Landshut. His father served as governor in Brandenburg; a few months after Albrecht's birth, he was enfeoffed with the electorate at the Council of Constance by the Luxembourg emperor Sigismund.

After passing some time at the court of Emperor Sigismund, Albrecht took part in the Hussite Wars, and afterwards distinguished himself whilst assisting Sigismund's successor, the Habsburg king Albert II of Germany, against the Hussites and their Polish allies. In 1435, he and his eldest brother John went on a pilgrimage to Jerusalem.

=== Reign in Franconia ===
On the division of territory which followed his father's death in 1440, Albrecht received the Principality of Ansbach, while John took over the rule of Brandenburg as its elector. Although Albrecht's resources were meager, he soon took a leading place among the German princes and was especially prominent in resisting the attempts of the towns to obtain self-government.

Nevertheless, Albrecht's plans to re-unite the former Duchy of Franconia under his rule failed: in 1443, he formed a league directed mainly against the Imperial City of Nuremberg, over which his late father had formerly exercised the rights of burgrave. It was not until 1448, however, that he found a pretext for attack. After initial military successes in the First Margrave War, he was defeated at the Battle of Pillenreuther Weiher, resulting in the Treaty of Bamberg (22 June 1450), which forced Albrecht to return all of the conquered territory and to recognize the independence of Nuremberg and its associated towns.

Albrecht supported the Habsburg emperor Frederick III in his struggle with the princes who desired reforms in the Holy Roman Empire, and in return for this loyalty received many marks of favour from Frederick, including extensive judicial rights which aroused considerable irritation among neighbouring rulers.

In 1457, Albrecht arranged a marriage between his eldest son John, and Margaret, daughter of William III, Landgrave of Thuringia, who inherited the claims upon Hungary and Bohemia of her mother, a granddaughter of Emperor Sigismund. The attempt to secure these thrones for the Hohenzollerns through this marriage failed, and a similar fate befell Albrecht's efforts to revive in his own favour the disused title of duke of Franconia.

The sharp dissensions which existed among the princes over the question of reform culminated in the Bavarian War from 1459 to 1463, when Albrecht was confronted with a league under the leadership of Elector Palatine Frederick I and his Wittelsbach cousin Duke Louis IX of Bavaria-Landshut. Though defeated in the struggle, Albrecht continued fighting against Prince-bishop Rudolf II of Würzburg and even forged an alliance with his former enemy, the Bohemian king George of Poděbrady, a step which caused Pope Paul II to place him under the ban.

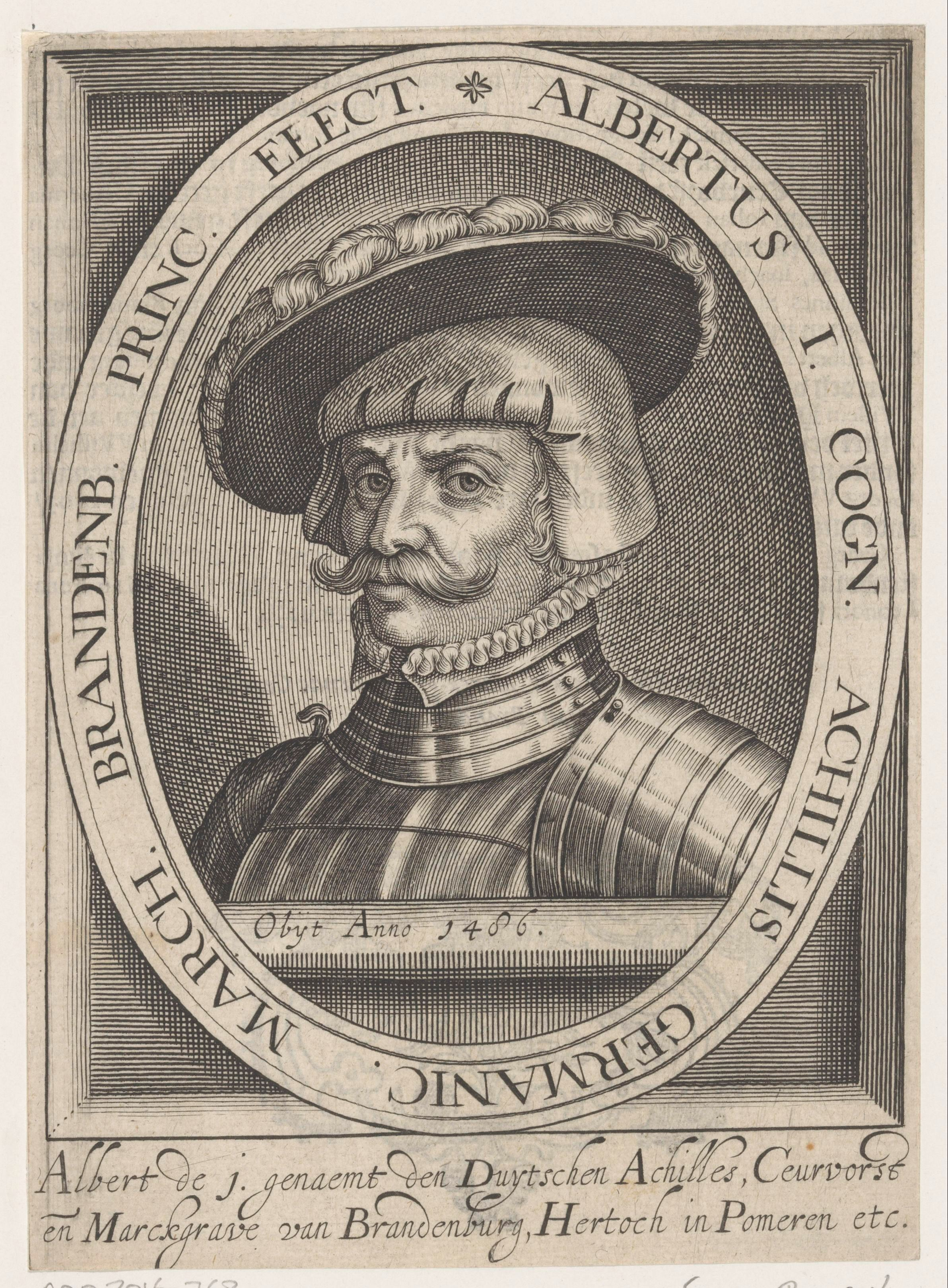
Elector Albrecht Achilles, 17th century engraving

Albrecht permanently resided at Ansbach from 1460; he also inherited the Principality of Kulmbach upon the death of his brother John in 1464.

=== Brandenburg elector ===
In 1471, Albrecht became Elector of Brandenburg, owing to the abdication of his remaining brother, Elector Frederick II, the year before. Now sole ruler over the entire Hohenzollern estates, he was soon actively engaged in their administration. By the 1472 Treaty of Prenzlau he ended the War of the Succession of Stettin, bringing the Duchy of Pomerania also under his supremacy.

Having established his right to levy a tonnage on wines in the mark, he issued in February 1473 the Dispositio Achillea, which decreed that the Margraviate of Brandenburg should descend in its entirety to the eldest son, while the younger sons should receive the Franconian possessions of the family. After treating in vain for a marriage between one of his sons and Mary of Burgundy, daughter and heiress of Duke Charles the Bold, Albrecht handed over the government of Brandenburg to his eldest son John Cicero, and returned to his Franconian possessions.

Albrecht's main attention afterwards was claimed by the business of the empire. Seriously ill, he took part in the imperial election of 1486 which selected Maximilian of Austria as King of the Romans at Frankfurt Cathedral. A few weeks later, in March, Albrecht died while still staying in Frankfurt; he was buried in the Heilsbronn Abbey church near Ansbach. He left a considerable amount of treasure.

== Family and children ==
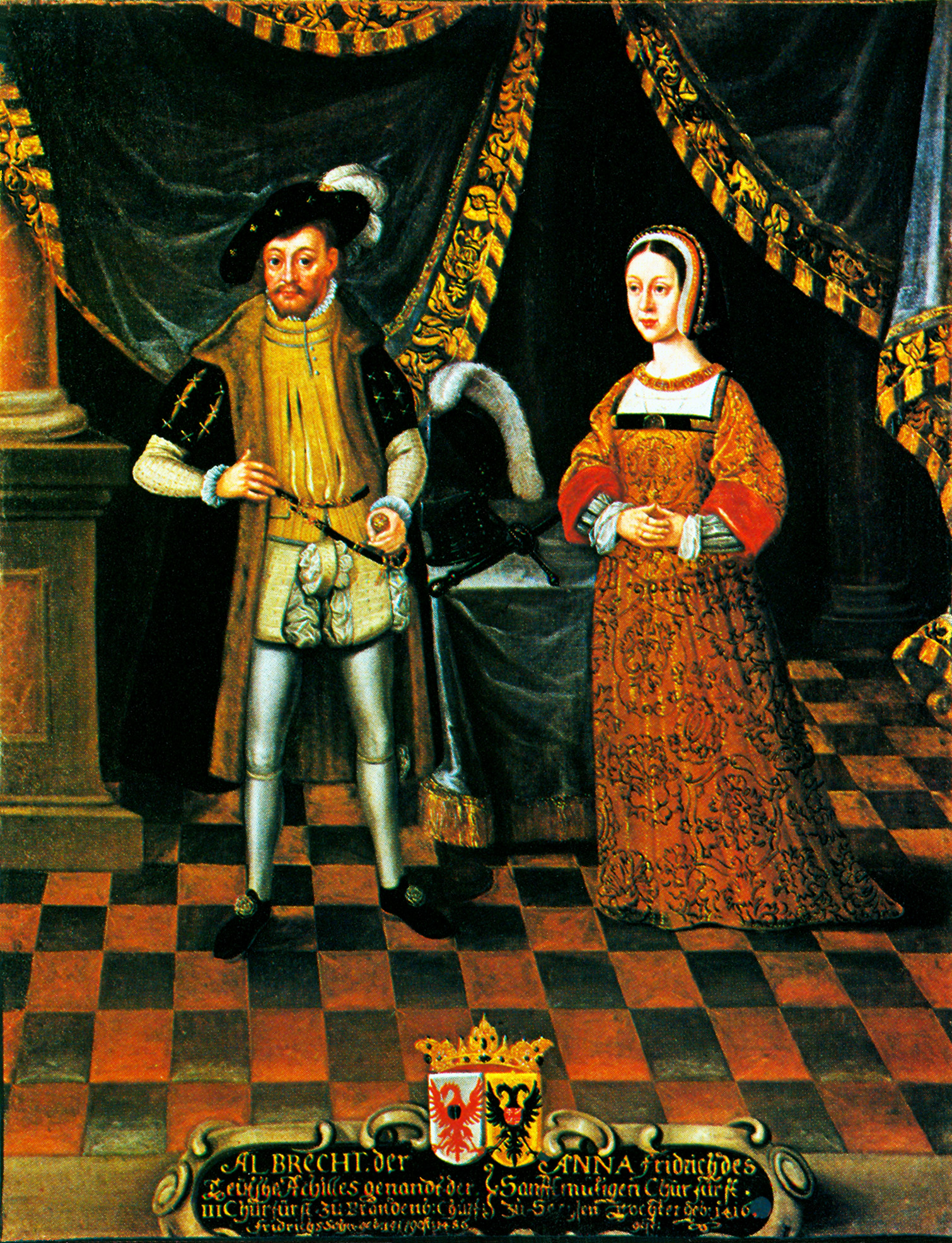
Albrecht with his second consort Anna of Saxony (c. 1625)

Albrecht was married twice. First, he married 12 November 1446 Margaret of Baden, daughter of Margrave Jakob I of Baden and Catherine of Lorraine. From this marriage he had following children:

1. Wolfgang, born and died in 1450.
2. Ursula (25 September 1450 – 25 October 1508, Breslau), married Duke Henry I, Duke of Münsterberg-Oels.
3. Elisabeth, (29 October 1451, Ansbach – 28 March 1524, Nürtingen), married Eberhard II, Duke of Württemberg.
4. Margareta (18 April 1453 – 27 April 1509), abbess of the Poor Clares convent at Hof.
5. Friedrich, died young.
6. John Cicero, Elector of Brandenburg (2 August 1455 – 9 January 1499).

Margaret died 24 October 1457 and in 1458 Albrecht married Anna, daughter of Frederick II, Elector of Saxony and Margarete of Austria. Their children were:

1. Frederick I, (German: Friedrich II. von Brandenburg-Ansbach-Kulmbach or Friedrich der Ältere; 1460–1536), Margrave in Ansbach since 1486 and Bayreuth since 1495.
2. Amalie (1 October 1461, Plassenburg – 3 September 1481, Baden-Baden), married Kaspar, Count Palatine of Zweibrücken.
3. Anna, born and died in 1462.
4. Barbara (30 May 1464, Ansbach – 4 September 1515, Ansbach), married:
  1. in Berlin 11 October 1472 to Duke Henry XI of Głogów;
  2. in Frankfurt (Oder) 20 August 1476 to King Ladislaus II of Bohemia and Hungary.
5. Albrecht, born and died in 1466.
6. Sibylle (31 May 1467, Ansbach – 9 July 1524, Kaster), married Duke Wilhelm IV of Jülich and Berg.
7. Siegmund, Margrave in Bayreuth, (27 September 1468, Ansbach – 26 February 1495, Ansbach).
8. Albrecht, born and died in 1470.
9. Georg (30 December 1472, Berlin – 5 December 1476, Kadolzburg).
10. Dorothea (12 December 1471, Berlin – 13 February 1520, Bamberg), Abbess in Bamberg.
11. Elisabeth (8 April 1474, Ansbach – 25 April 1507, Römhild), married Count Hermann VIII of Henneberg-Aschach (1470–1535)
12. Magdalene (29 July 1476, Berlin – before 4 February 1480).
13. Anastasia (14 March 1478, Ansbach – 4 July 1534, Ilmenau), married Count William IV of Henneberg-Schleusingen (1478–1559)

=== Dynastic marriages of his children ===
In 1474, Albrecht married his daughter Barbara to Duke Henry XI of Głogów, who left his possessions on his death in 1476 to his widow with reversion to her family, an arrangement which was resisted by Henry's kinsman, Duke Jan II of Żagań. Aided by King Matthias Corvinus of Hungary, Jan of Żagań invaded Brandenburg, and the Pomeranians seized the opportunity to revolt. Under these circumstances Albrecht returned to Brandenburg in 1478, compelled the Pomeranians to recognize his supremacy, and, after a stubborn struggle, secured a part of Duke Henry's lands for his daughter in 1482.

Albrecht III Achilles House of Hohenzollern Born: 9 November 1414 Died: 11 March 1486
Regnal titles
Preceded by Frederick I	Margrave of Brandenburg-Ansbach; 1440–1486	Succeeded by Frederick II
Preceded by John "the Alchemist"	Margrave of Brandenburg-Kulmbach; 1457–1486	Succeeded by Siegmund
Preceded by Frederick II	Elector of Brandenburg; 1471–1486	Succeeded by John Cicero
