= Duchy of Bytom =

Principality founded in 1284 as a result of the division of the Duchy of Opole

Coordinates: 50°21′04″N 18°55′04″E

Duchy of Bytom Księstwo Bytomskie (pl)
- 1281–1498
- Coat of arms

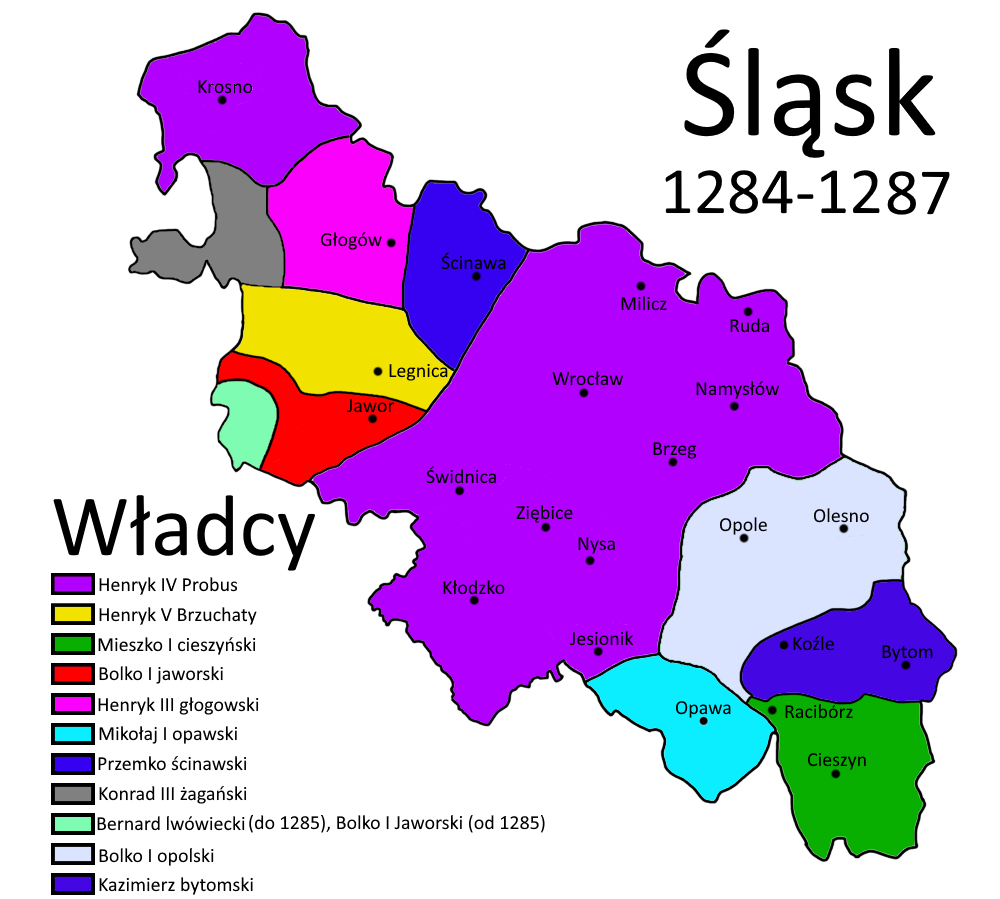
- Silesian duchies in 1284, Bytom in violet
- Status: Silesian duchy
- Capital: Bytom
- Religion: Catholicism
- Historical era: Middle Ages
  - Partitioned from Opole and Racibórz: 1281
  - Casimir sole ruler: 1284
  - Vassalized by Bohemia: 1289
  - Split off Koźle and Toszek: 1303
  - Divided between Oleśnica and Cieszyn: 1357–1459
  - Merged with Opole: 1498
Preceded by	Succeeded by
Duchy of Opole and Racibórz	Duchy of Opole
- Today part of: Poland

The Duchy of Bytom (Polish: Księstwo Bytomskie, Czech: Bytomské knížectví, German: Herzogtum Beuthen) was a duchy in Upper Silesia, one of the Silesian duchies of fragmented Piast-ruled Poland. It was established in Upper Silesia about 1281 during the division of the Duchy of Opole and Racibórz among the sons of Duke Władysław Opolski. The duchy's capital was Bytom, formerly part of Lesser Poland until in 1177 the Polish High Duke Casimir II the Just had attached it to the Silesian Duchy of Racibórz.

== History ==
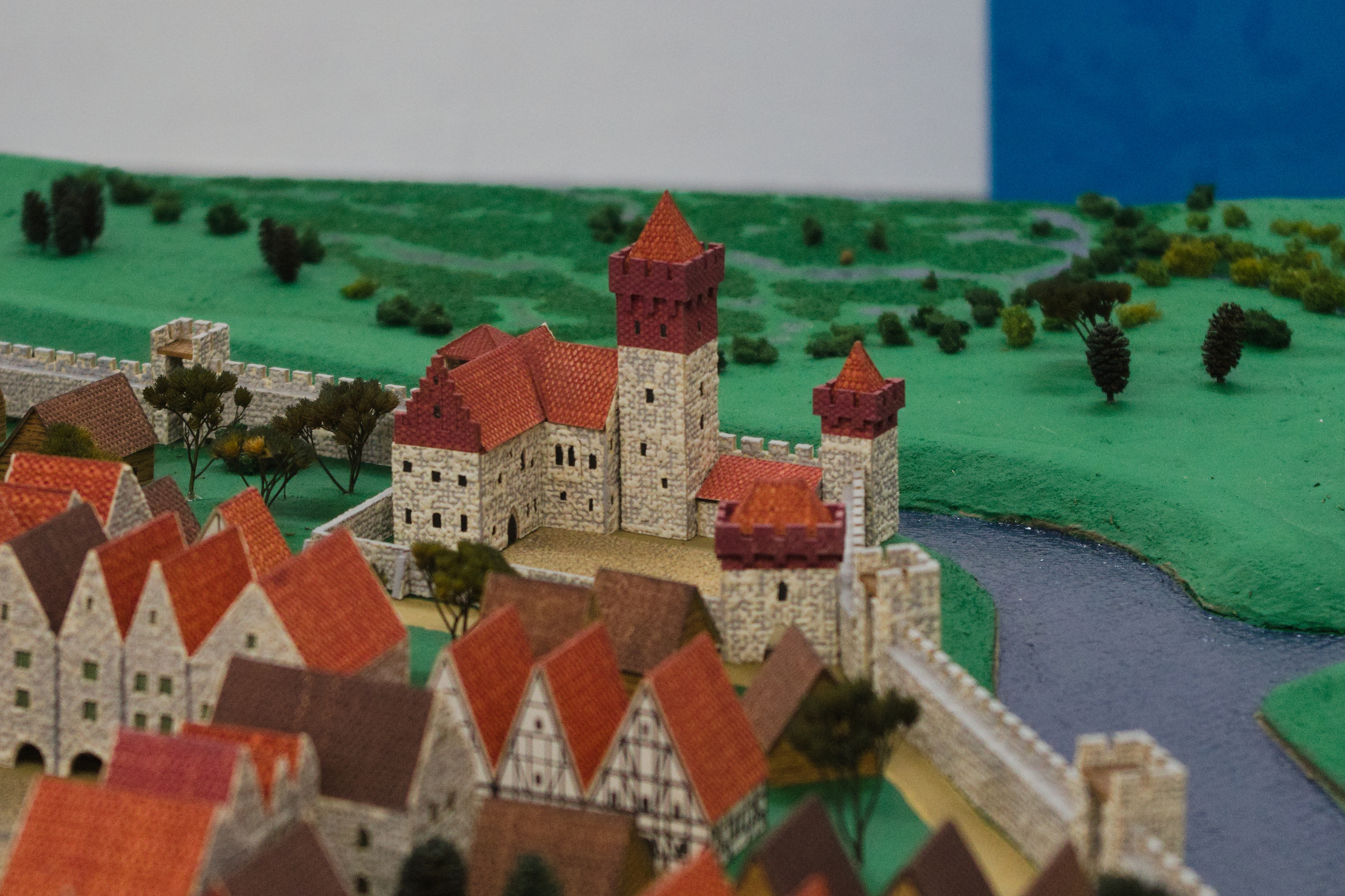
Contemporary model of the medieval Piast castle in Bytom

When Władysław's second son Casimir became Duke of Bytom, he at first ruled jointly with his brother Duke Bolko I of Opole and from 1284 on alone. The conflict with his Piast cousin Duke Henryk IV Probus of Silesia-Wrocław led Casimir to seek shelter from King Wenceslaus II of Bohemia and in 1289 he became the first Silesian Piast duke to submit himself under Bohemian overlordship.

With the death of Casimir's grandson Duke Bolesław in 1355 the Bytom branch of the Piasts became extinct and in the following inheritance dispute his widow Margareta of Sternberg had to cede the northern part of the duchy including the lordship of Koźle to Duke Konrad I of Oleśnica, while the remaining part was bequested to Duke Casimir I of Cieszyn. Bytom remained divided until in 1459 Duke Wenceslaus I of Cieszyn sold his portion to Duke Konrad IX the Black of Oleśnica and the duchy was reunited under his rule.

In 1472 Matthias Corvinus of Hungary, then self-declared King of Bohemia, annexed Bytom and pledged it to Lord Jan of Zierotin. In 1498 it was finally merged back into the Duchy of Opole under the rule of Duke Jan II the Good. Jan had signed an inheritance treaty with Margrave George of Brandenburg-Ansbach, who in 1526 was enfeoffed with Bytom by King Louis II Jagiellon of Bohemia.

His rule however was denied by Louis' successors from the House of Habsburg, who suspiciously eyed the gain of power of the House of Hohenzollern in Silesia. After the 1620 Battle of White Mountain Emperor Ferdinand II of Habsburg took the opportunity to deprive Elector George Wiliam of Brandenburg of the rule over Bytom. It then remained a state country within the Habsburg monarchy until its annexation by Prussia in 1742.

== Dukes ==
Of Bytom (1281/1282-1355/1357):

- Casimir of Bytom (1281/1282-1312)
- Siemowit of Bytom (1312-1316)
- George of Bytom (1316-1327)
- Władysław of Bytom (1316-1352)
- Bolesław of Bytom (1352-1355)
- Margareta of Sternberg (1355-1357)

Cieszyn Piasts (1357-1459):

- Kazimierz I of Cieszyn (1357-1358)
- Przemysław I Noszak (1358-1405)
- Bolesław I, Duke of Cieszyn (1405-1431)
- Wacław I of Cieszyn (1431/1442-1452 i 1452-1459)
- Bolesław II of Cieszyn (1452)

Oleśnica Piasts (1357-1472/1492):

- Konrad I of Oleśnica (1357-1366)
- Konrad II the Gray (1366-1403)
- Konrad III the Old (1403-1412)
- Konrad IV the Elder (1412/1413-1416), Konrad V Kantner (1412/1413-1427), Konrad VI the Dean (1416-1427), Konrad VII the White (1316-1450), Konrad VIII the Younger (1416-1427)
- Konrad IX the Black (1450-1471, Konrad X the White)
- Konrad X the White (1450-1452, 1471-1472, de facto 1492)

Opole Piasts

- Jan II the Good (1498-1532)

== See also ==
- Dukes of Silesia
