= Konrad V Kantner =

- Duke of Oleśnica, Koźle
- Coat-of-arms of Silesia
- Born: ca. 1385
- Died: 10 September 1439
- Noble family: Silesian Piasts of Oleśnica
- Spouse: Margareta
- Issue: Konrad IX the Black; Konrad X the White; Anna; Margareta
- Father: Konrad III the Old
- Mother: Judith/Guta

Konrad V Kantner (ca. 1385 – 10 September 1439) was a duke of Oleśnica, Koźle, half of Bytom and half of Ścinawa during 1412–1427 (with his brothers as co-rulers), since 1427 sole ruler over Oleśnica.

He was the second son of Konrad III the Old, Duke of Oleśnica, by his wife Judith. Like his one older and three younger brothers, at the baptism he received the name of Konrad, which was characteristic in this branch of the House of Piast. His nickname of Kantner was derived from the town of Kanth (pl: Kąty Wrocławskie), who was a property of the Oleśnica dukes since 1379.

== Life ==
After the death of his father in 1412, Konrad V succeeded him in all his lands together with his older brother Konrad IV the Elder as co-rulers, due to the minority of their younger brothers.

In 1416, when all Konrad III's sons attained his majority, Konrad IV renounced to the government on behalf of Konrad V and the rest of his brothers. However, because two other brothers (Konrad VI the Dean and Konrad VIII the Younger), also pursued a Church career, the main beneficiaries in the government are two others laic brothers: Konrad V and Konrad VII the White, who in 1431 co-founded in Koźle a Minorites Cloister. In 1434 they purchased the town of Wołczyn to Duke Louis II of Brieg. The co-rulership was maintained until 1427, when was made the division of the Duchy: Konrad V retained the main city of Oleśnica.

Like his brothers, Konrad V fought against the Hussites. In 1428 they tried unsuccessfully to prevent their depredations in the Duchy of Troppau. On 4 April 1431 they raided Gliwice, which was occupied by the Hussites and where just held religious discussions in which the Lithuanian prince Sigismund Korybut, a nephew of Vytautas, was involved. Presumably, therefore, undertook the Hussites in 1432 a raid into the Duchy of Oleśnica, which was largely spared from them until then. Konrad V and his brothers, however, managed to defeat them at Ścinawa. Together with his brother Konrad IV, other Piast Dukes and the cities of Wrocław, Świdnica and Nysa was notarized on 13 September 1432 for the Hussites the still occupied cities of Niemcza, Kluczbork and Otmuchów the amount of 10,000 groschen for damages.

Their fight against the Hussites was rewarded by Emperor Sigismund, who, in his capacity as King of Bohemia, in 1434 transfer to them the districts of Psie Pole and Psary. Three years later, in 1437 he confirmed to them the complete investiture of this territories by Escheat, so that upon the death of the childless Konrad VII they could reverted to the Kingdom. Two years later, Konrad V died of the plague. The guardianship of his minor sons was taken by his brother Konrad VII.

== Marriage and issue ==
By 9 October 1411, Konrad V married Margareta (d. 15 March 1449), whose origins are unknown. They had five children:

1. Agnes (b. aft. 1411 – d. Herbst, September 1448), married in 1437 to Kaspar I Schlik, Count of Passaun-Weisskirchen and Imperial Chancellor.
2. Konrad IX the Black (b. ca. 1415 – d. 14 August 1471).
3. Konrad X the White (b. 1420 – d. 21 September 1492).
4. Anna (b. ca. 1425? – d. aft. 15 August 1482), married by 1444 to Duke Władysław I of Płock.
5. Margareta (b. by 1430 – d. 10 May 1466), Abbess of Trebnitz (1456).

In his will, Konrad V leave the town of Wołów to his wife as her dower, who was ruled by her until her own death. His sons were excluded from the government by their uncle Konrad VII, who maintained his rule until 1450, when they finally deposed him and assumed the full control over the Duchy.

Preceded by Konrad III the Old	Duke of Oleśnica; 1412–1439 with Konrad IV (1412-1416); Konrad VI (1412-1427); Konrad VII (1412-1427); Konrad VIII (1412-1427)	Succeeded by Konrad VII the White
Preceded by Konrad III the Old	Duke of Koźle; 1412–1427 with Konrad IV (1412-1416); Konrad VI; Konrad VII; Konrad VIII	Succeeded by Konrad VII the White
Preceded by Konrad III the Old	Duke of Bytom (1/2); 1412–1427 with Konrad IV (1412-1416); Konrad VI; Konrad VII; Konrad VIII	Succeeded by Konrad VII the White
Preceded by Konrad III the Old	Duke of Ścinawa (1/2); 1412–1427 with Konrad IV (1412-1416); Konrad VI; Konrad VII; Konrad VIII	Succeeded by Konrad VIII the Younger
