= Konrad VIII the Younger =

- Duke of Oleśnica, Koźle
- Coat-of-arms of Silesia
- Born: after 1397
- Died: before 5 September 1444
- Noble family: Silesian Piasts of Oleśnica
- Father: Konrad III the Old
- Mother: Judith

Konrad VIII the Younger (Polish: Konrad VIII Młody; after 1397 – before 5 September 1444), was a Duke of Oleśnica, Koźle, half of Bytom and half of Ścinawa during 1416–1427 (with his brothers as co-rulers) and sole Duke of half of Ścinawa since 1427 until his death.

He was the fifth and youngest son of Konrad III the Old, Duke of Oleśnica, by his wife Judith. Like his four older brothers, at the baptism he received the name of Konrad, which was characteristic in this branch of the House of Piast.

== Life ==
=== Choosing of the Church career ===
The modesty of his father's legacy forced that, of the five sons of Konrad III, three decided to follow the ecclesiastic career; Konrad VIII was one of them. The Church, during the time of the political fragmentation of Poland and the enormous progeny of the Piast dynasty, was the easiest way to develop influence in the fate of Silesia, by obtaining the prestigious (and profitable) Church dignities, which Piast princes easily accepted. The oldest of the brothers, Konrad IV, was made Provost of Wroclaw, and since 1417 Bishop of Wroclaw, and the other, Konrad VI, in 1414, was appointed Dean of the Wroclaw Chapter.

=== The Teutonic Order ===
In 1416, Konrad VIII became in a Teutonic Knight. Perhaps this decision was prompting by his brother Konrad VII the White, who fight at the side of the Teutonic Order in 1410 in the Battle of Grunwald. During the solemn religious vows of submission in Malbork Castle, Konrad VIII was accompanied by all his brothers. Then, in exchange for a loan of 3,000 Prague groschens, Konrad IV, Konrad V Kantner and Konrad VII concluded with the Great Master of the Teutonic Order, Michael Küchmeister von Sternberg, an alliance against Poland and Lithuania. Committed themselves to assist in the Order, if that was attacked by the army of King Wladyslaw II Jagiello of Poland and Grand Duke of Lithuania Witold.

Konrad VIII served as Prokurator of the Teutonic Order over Gardawa during 1425-1429 and over Lochstedt during 1429-1433. The highest religious position exercised by him was the office of Provincial of the Teutonic Order in Bohemia and Moravia.

=== Government in Silesia ===
Konrad VIII, despite the adoption of the religious state, didn't give up his rights over the government of his Silesian lands. In 1416 the older brother Konrad IV decided to renounce the government on his younger brothers, who co-ruled all the Duchy. After the death of Konrad VI in 1427, Konrad VIII took over the independent governments over Ścinawa and Rudna together with the surrounding areas. Henceforth he began to use the style of Duke of Ścinawa.

During the Hussite Wars in 1431 he helped his brother Konrad VII in Gliwice to escape from the hands of the Hussites. However, in 1435 he joined to the coalition of princes and cities who concluded an agreement with the Hussites, in order to preserve their patrimony.

Preceded by Konrad IV the Elder and Konrad V Kantner	Duke of Oleśnica with Konrad V, Konrad VI and Konrad VII; 1416–1427	Succeeded by Konrad V Kantner
Preceded by Konrad IV the Elder and Konrad V Kantner	Duke of Koźle with Konrad V, Konrad VI and Konrad VII; 1416–1427	Succeeded by Konrad VII the White
Preceded by Konrad IV the Elder and Konrad V Kantner	Duke of Bytom (1/2) with Konrad V, Konrad VI and Konrad VII; 1416–1427	Succeeded by Konrad VII the White
Preceded by Konrad IV the Elder and Konrad V Kantner	Duke of Ścinawa (1/2) with Konrad V, Konrad VI and Konrad VII (until 1427); 1416–1444	Succeeded by Konrad VII the White
