= Conrad VI =

Conrad VI or Konrad VI may refer to:

- Konrad VI von Haimberg (died 1381), bishop of Regensburg
- Konrad VI the Dean (died 1427), duke of Oleśnica
- Conrad VI of Rietberg (died 1508), bishop of Osnabrück (as Konrad II) and of Münster (as Konrad IV)
