= Conrad VII =

Conrad VII or Konrad VII may refer to:

- Konrad VII von Erbach (c. 1360 – 1423), German hereditary nobleman who lived near the river Main
- Konrad VII von Soest (died 1437), bishop of Regensburg
- Konrad VII the White (died 1452), duke of Oleśnica
