= Konrad III the Old =

- Duke of Oleśnica, Koźle
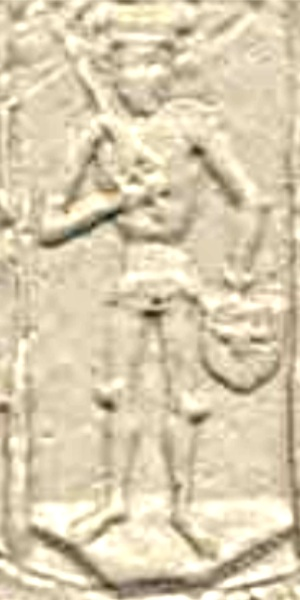
- Born: c. 1359
- Died: 28 December 1412
- Noble family: Silesian Piasts of Oleśnica
- Spouse: Judith/Jutta/Guta
- Issue: Konrad IV the Elder; Konrad V Kantner; Konrad VI the Dean; Konrad VII the White; Konrad VIII the Younger; Euphemia; Hedwig
- Father: Konrad II the Gray
- Mother: Agnes of Cieszyn

Konrad III the Old (Polish: Konrad III Stary) (c. 1359 – 28 December 1412) was a Duke of Oleśnica, Koźle, half of Bytom and half of Ścinawa since 1377 (until 1403 with his father as co-ruler).

He was the only son of Konrad II the Gray, Duke of Oleśnica, by his wife Agnes, daughter of Casimir I, Duke of Cieszyn.

== Life ==
In 1377 his father named him co-ruler of all his lands, as his only son and heir. Konrad III began his reign alone only in 1403, after his father's death. Little is known about his reign.

== Marriage and issue ==
By 1380 he married with Judith (also named Jutta or Guta) (d. 26 June 1416), whose origins are unknown. They had seven children:

1. Konrad IV the Elder (ca. 1384 – 9 August 1447).
2. Konrad V Kantner (ca. 1385 – 10 September 1439).
3. Konrad VI the Dean (ca. 1391 – 3 September 1427).
4. Konrad VII the White (aft. 1396 – 14 February 1452).
5. Konrad VIII the Younger (aft. 1397 – by 5 September 1444).
6. Euphemia (ca. 1404? – 27 November 1442), married firstly on 14 January 1420 to Elector Albert III of Saxony and secondly in 1432 to Prince George I of Anhalt-Dessau.
7. Hedwig (ca. 1405/16? – by 25 June 1454), married by 1430 to Duke Henryk IX Starszy of Głogów.

Konrad III the Old House of Piast Born: c. – c. 1359 Died: 28 December 1412
Preceded by Konrad II the Gray	Duke of Oleśnica with Konrad II (until 1403); 1377–1412	Succeeded by Konrad IV the Elder and Konrad V Kantner
Preceded by Konrad II the Gray	Duke of Koźle with Konrad II (until 1403); 1377–1412	Succeeded by Konrad IV the Elder and Konrad V Kantner
Preceded by Konrad II the Gray	Duke of Bytom (1/2) with Konrad II (until 1403); 1377–1412	Succeeded by Konrad IV the Elder and Konrad V Kantner
Preceded by Konrad II the Gray	Duke of Ścinawa (1/2) with Konrad II (until 1403); 1377–1412	Succeeded by Konrad IV the Elder and Konrad V Kantner
