= Silesian Piasts =

Elder of four lines of the Polish Piast dynasty

- Parent house: Piast dynasty
- Country: Duchy of Silesia
- Founded: 1138; 888 years ago
- Founder: Władysław II the Exile
- Current head: Extinct
- Final ruler: George William of Legnica
- Titles: High Dukes of Poland; Dukes of Silesia
- Dissolution: 1675; 351 years ago (male line)
- Cadet branches: Silesian Piasts of Opole; Silesian Piasts of Glogów

The Silesian Piasts were the oldest branch of the royal Piast dynasty of the Kingdom of Poland. They ruled various decentralized duchies in Silesia from 1138 until the extinction of their male line in 1675. Founded by Władysław II the Exile, the family quickly fractured into several independent regional lines, governing territories such as the duchies of Wrocław, Opole, Głogów, and Legnica.

During the High Middle Ages (c. 1000-c. 1300), the early Silesian Piasts drove a profound structural and economic transformation of the region. Dukes like Henry I the Bearded actively promoted the Ostsiedlung, inviting German, Walloon, and Flemish specialists to their domains, which triggered a significant demographic and linguistic shift, making German the dominant language of court and administration by the 14th century.

However, this early prosperity was followed by severe territorial fragmentation and a long political decline. Between 1327 and 1329, as their power waned, the Silesian dukes sought stability by swearing fealty to John of Bohemia, legally incorporating their lands into the Lands of the Bohemian Crown within the Holy Roman Empire. Poland formally renounced its sovereignty over the region in the Treaty of Trentschin (1335). For the next 350 years, the increasingly marginalized Piasts occupied a hybrid political space—navigating their identity as biological descendants of the Polish royal house and minor territorial vassals under Bohemian and Habsburg suzerainty, until the death of George William, Duke of Liegnitz, in 1675.

== Early history ==
The history of the Silesian Piasts began with the feudal fragmentation of Poland in 1138 following the death of the Polish duke Bolesław III Wrymouth. While the Silesian province and the Kraków seniorate were assigned to Władysław II the Exile, his three younger half-brothers Bolesław IV the Curly, Mieszko III the Old, and Henry of Sandomierz received Masovia, Greater Poland and Sandomierz, respectively, according to the Testament of Boleslaw III.

Władysław soon entered into fierce conflicts with his brothers and the Polish nobility. When in 1146 he attempted to take control of the whole of Poland, he was excommunicated by Archbishop Jakub ze Żnina of Gniezno and his brothers finally drove him into exile. He was received by King Conrad III of Germany, his brother-in-law by Władysław's consort Agnes of Babenberg, at the imperial palace of Altenburg. Silesia and the Seniorate Province came under the control of second-born Bolesław IV the Curly, Duke of Masovia. In the same year King Conrad III attempted to regain power for Władysław, but failed. Not until 1157 Duke Bolesław IV the Curly was defeated in a campaign by Konrads successor Emperor Frederick Barbarossa, however, the "Silesian issue" was not mentioned in the treaty concluded by the rulers, and so Władysław remained in exile. He died in 1159 without returning to Poland.

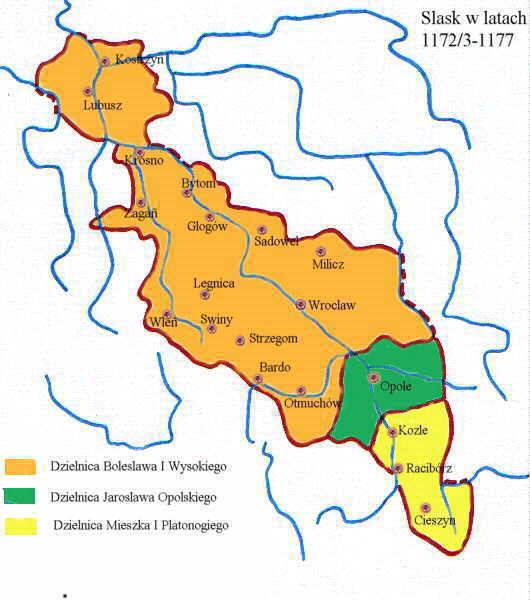
Fragmentation of Silesia 1172/73 Bolesław the Tall Jarosław of Opole Mieszko Tanglefoot

In 1163, Bolesław the Curly was pressed by Frederick Barbarossa to return the hereditary Silesian province to Władysław's sons Bolesław the Tall, Konrad Spindleshanks and Mieszko Tanglefoot, though he retained the Seniorate Province and the Polish throne at Kraków. The Duchy of Silesia remained within the Polish seniorate constitution, but Władysław's sons were obliged to pay a yearly tribute to the Holy Roman Emperor. High Duke Bolesław the Curly also retained control of the most important Silesian cities such as Wrocław, Opole, Głogów, Racibórz and Legnica until 1166 when the Silesian dukes took control of these parts. Władysław's sons probably ruled Silesia together until 1172, when they divided their territory: Bolesław the Tall, eldest brother, received the large area from Legnica up the Oder River to Wrocław and created the Duchy of Opole for his eldest son Jarosław. Mieszko Tanglefoot the smaller Duchy of Racibórz around Racibórz and Cieszyn. Their minor brother Konrad Spindleshanks received Żagań, Głogów and Krosno from the hands of Bolesław the Tall. As Konrad prepared himself for a clerical career at the Fulda monastery, his brother Bolesław administered his possessions until Konrad's early death, when he incorporated Konrad's part into his own duchy.

Golden eagle of the Upper Silesian Piasts

Mieszko at the same time was able to expand his duchy with the former Lesser Polish territories of Bytom and Oświęcim, given to him by High Duke Casimir II the Just, and also with the Duchy of Opole, which he received after the death of Duke Jarosław and his father Bolesław in 1201. One year later, Bolesław's heir, Duke Henry I the Bearded, and his uncle Mieszko moreover specified to rule out the right of succession among their branches, an arrangement which was largely responsible for the special position of what would become Upper Silesia. In the same year, Poland abolished the seniorate and the Silesian duchies became independent entities.

== Struggle for the Polish Crown ==
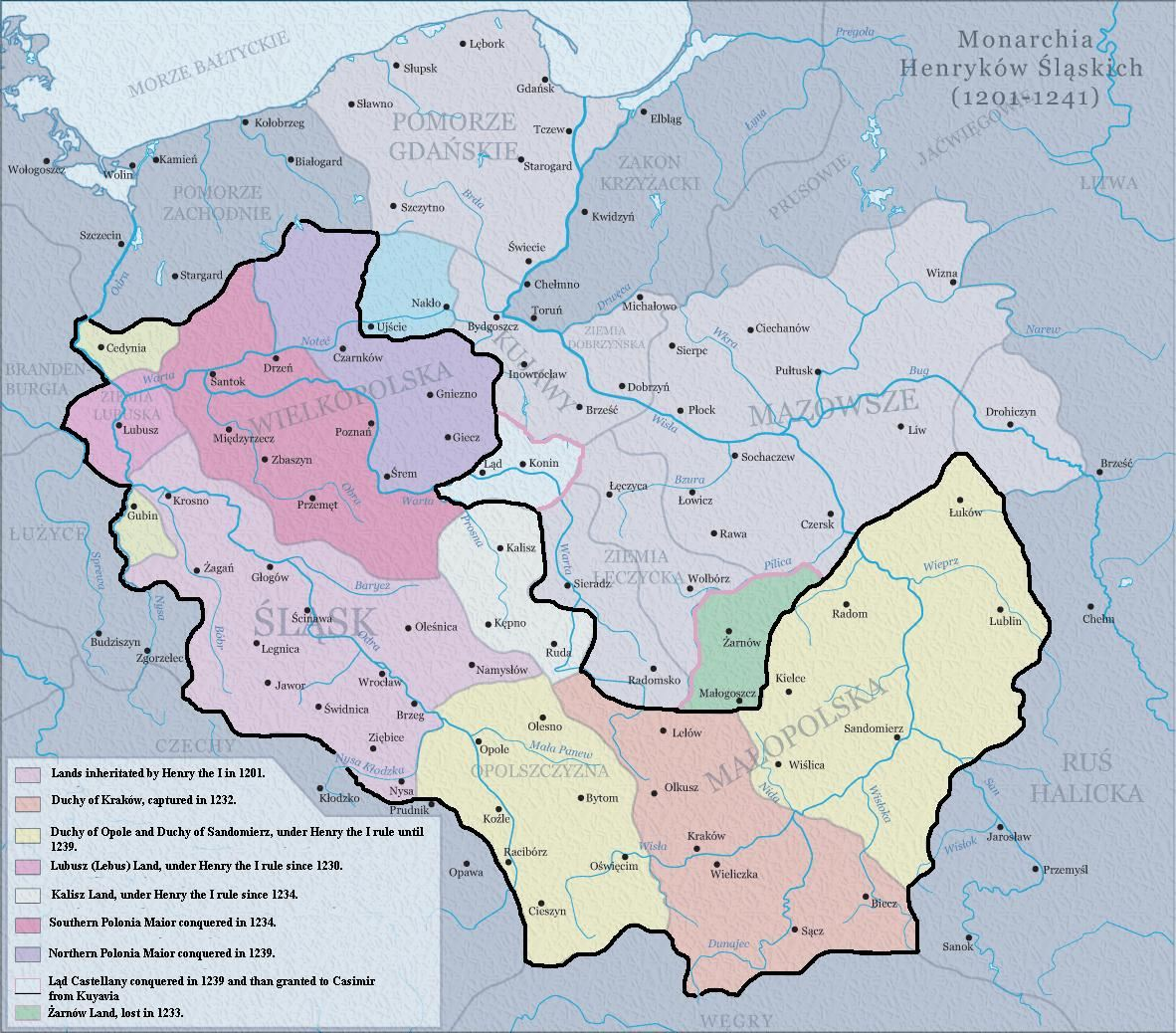
Monarchy of the Silesian Henries

Henry I the Bearded actively took part in the inner-Polish conflicts and expanded his dominion with determination. Henry, before securing in 1229 the sovereignty in Kraków, had made no less persevering efforts to bring Greater Poland also under his dominion. From the beginning of the thirteenth century he had not ceased to intervene in the disputes which were carried on between the descendants of Mieszko the Old. At last in 1234, a good half of that province was formally ceded to him. As a guardian of minor dukes, Henry moreover ruled over Opole and Sandomierz. But, he aimed higher. This Silesian prince not only intended to enlarge his possessions; he proposed to make them the nucleus of a restored Kingdom of Poland. He became duke of Kraków (Polonia Minor) in 1232, which gave him the title of the Senior Duke of Poland (see Testament of Bolesław III Krzywousty). Henry expanded his realm also outside Poland ruling over Barnim, Teltow (owned temporarily) as well as parts of Lower Lusatia. Unfortunately, despite his efforts, he never gained the Polish crown.

The royal crown, almost forgotten since the fall of Bolesław II, was destined by him for his eldest son, whom he associated with his rule towards the end of his life. This Henry II the Pious, who succeeded his father in 1238, was, in fact, entirely worthy of the heritage of the first Piasts. Pursuing the very able policy of Henry the Bearded, his son was moreover able to obtain the support of the clergy, with whom his father had had frequent disagreements. In a close alliance with his brother-in-law, Bohemian king Wenceslaus, he consolidated his position in Greater Poland against Barnim I of Pomerania and repelled an attack on castle Lubusz by the margrave of Brandenburg and the archbishop of Magdeburg. Following an old tradition of his dynasty, he placed himself under the protection of the Holy See, with which he also allied himself against Frederick II. In spite of all his German connections, Henry the Pious would, therefore, assuredly have maintained the independence and prestige of the kingdom if all his plan had not been annihilated by an unforeseen catastrophe. In 1241, he died as a Christian hero in the Battle of Legnica, in which he was attempting to arrest the Mongolian invasion. His death left the Silesian Piast dynasty deeply shaken.

== Fragmentation and turn to Bohemia ==
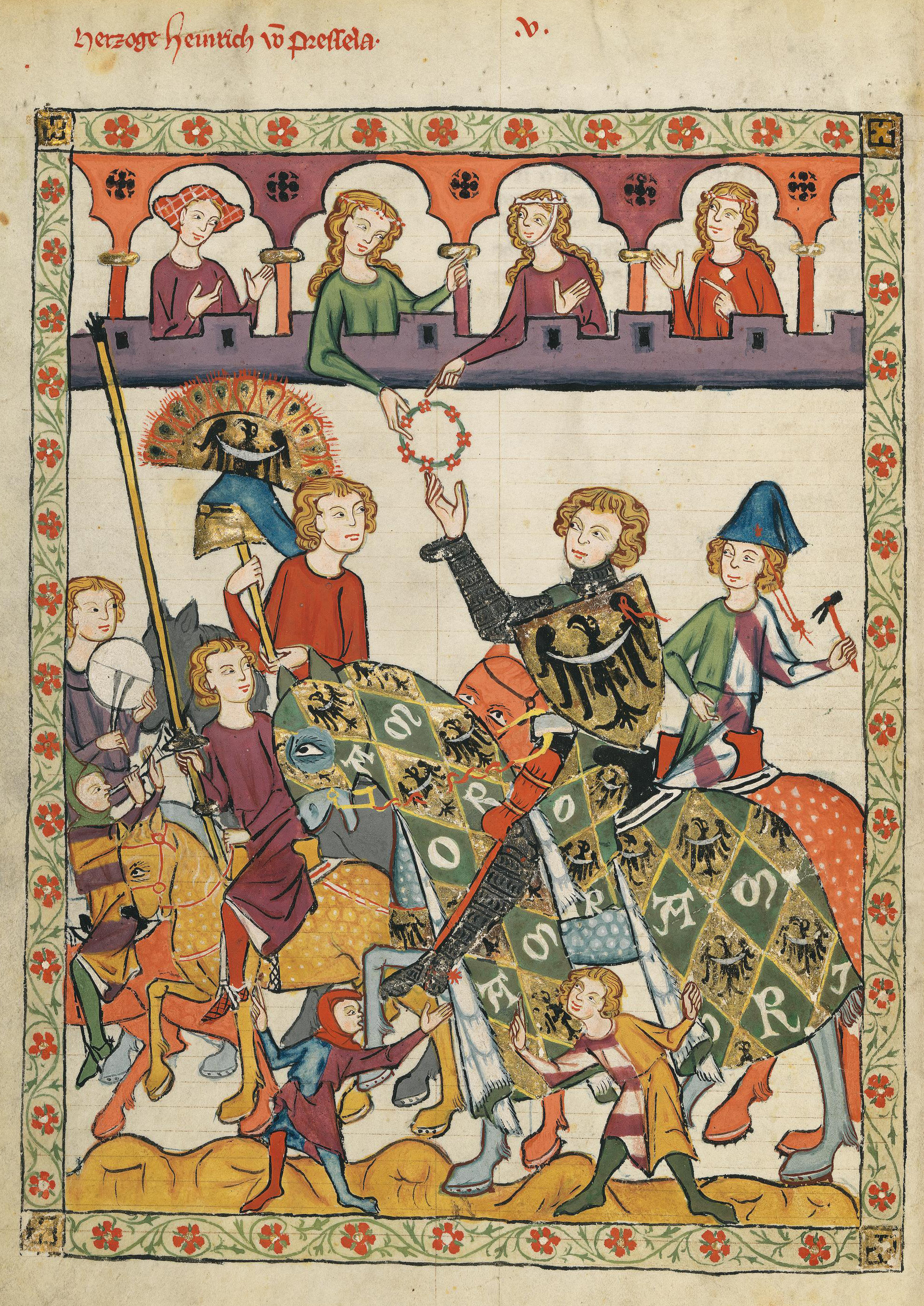
Henry IV. at his court

After Henry's death in 1241, his brother Bolesław II ruled on behalf of his underage brothers. Since all male members of the family were eligible to rule, a principle critical for the coming years, a hereditary division was put into practice in 1248/51. Bolesław established the duchy of Legnica, Konrad I Glogow, Henry III kept Wrocław together with Ladislaus, who would become archbishop of Salzburg. Soon the next generation divided the territory again. Jawor and Lwówek Śląski split off from Legnica, Duchy of Żagań and Ścinawa from Głogów. In the next generation Brzeg was detached from Wrocław, Świdnica and Duchy of Ziębice from Lwówek Śląski-Jawor and Oleśnica from Głogów. The Duchy of Opole, which was established by Mieszko I and called after its residence Opole, wasn't spared from the divisions, they only began one generation later. The four sons of Wladyslaw I of Opole, a grandson of Mieszko, split the duchy into Opole, Koźle- Bytom, Racibórz and Teschen. These duchies were also split again in the next generation. Opole was divided into Opole, Niemodlin and Strzelce Opolskie, Koźle-Bytom in Koźle, Bytom and Toszek, Teschen in Teschen and Oświęcim.

These divisions often were the result of fierce and militant conflicts, in which not only the Silesian parties but also their partisans from other parts of Poland and neighboring Bohemia were involved. Whereas the connections to Poland diminished the political ties with Bohemia became increasingly stronger.

In their exile in Germany, the Piasts had witnessed the inner colonizations along the Elbe river and strived to develop sparsely populated Silesia by calling in Germans from the west, slowly increasing Silesia's German population which came to dominate the region over the next centuries.

The reign of duke Henry IV Probus was exemplary for the position of Silesias duchies in the area of tension between Poland and Bohemia. After the death of his father Henry III, he was raised in Prague at the court of Bohemian king Ottokar II, who also became his guardian. After Ottokar's death, he did not, as expected, became viceregent of Bohemia for underage Wenceslaus II but was compensated with Kłodzko by Rudolf of Habsburg, who also ennobled Henry to a count of the Holy Roman Empire and granted him his duchy as a fief. Henry not only obtained the preeminence in Silesia but, with the help of the German party in Polonia Minor, also the duchy of Kraków and became duke of Poland. He initially wanted Wenceslaus to become his successor, but changed his plan on the deathbed and granted Wrocław to Henry III and Kraków to Przemysł II, whereas Kłodzko returned to Bohemia.

== Vassals of Bohemia and decline ==
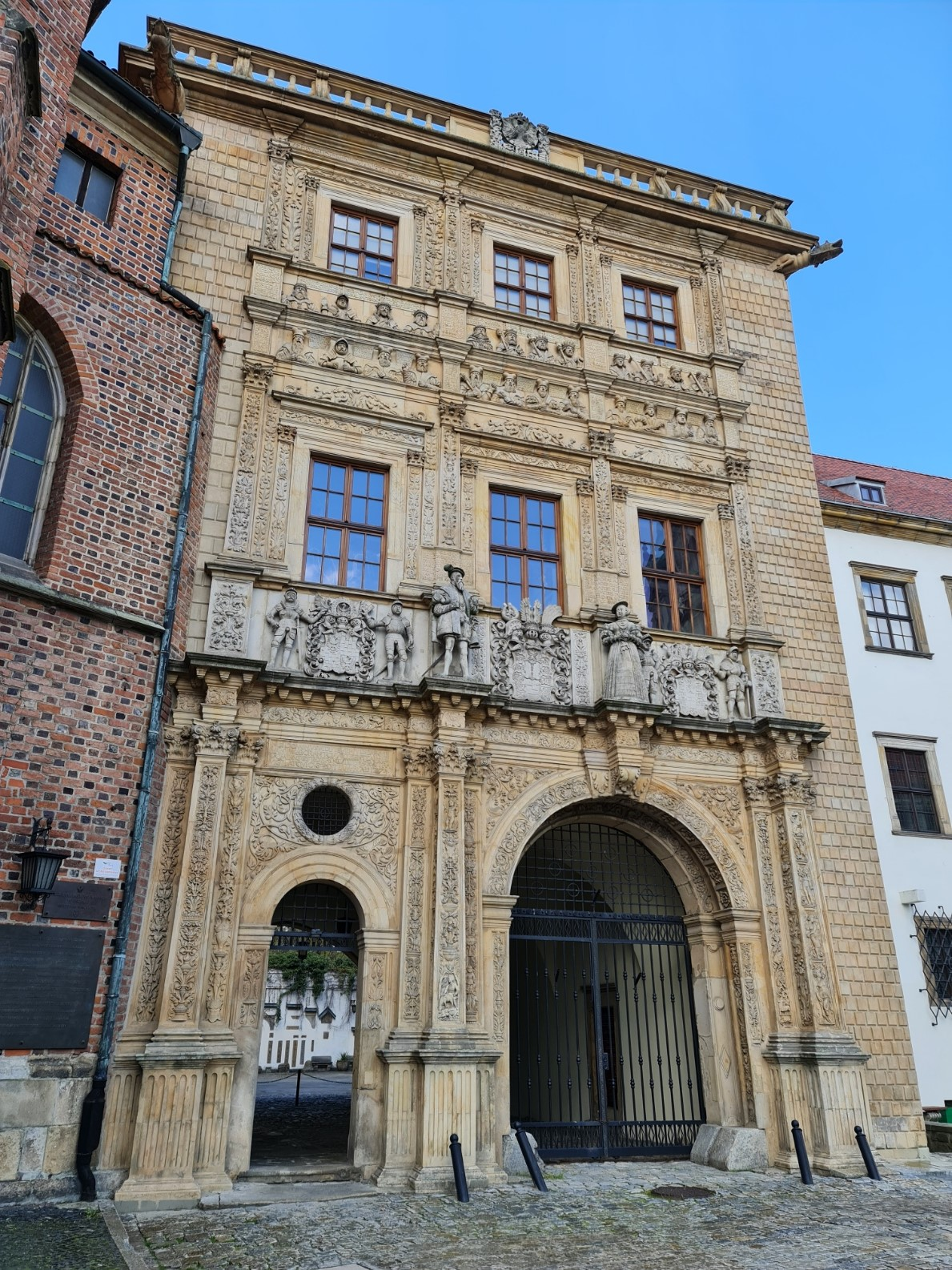
The gatehouse to the Silesian Piasts castle in Brzeg (1554–1560) with sculptures of the Piast rulers from Siemowit to Frederick II of Legnica

As Przemysł II united Poland, the weak and divided Silesian dukes needed a strong partner who could provide cover. They were now separated from the Polish state and subjected to the Bohemian crown.

After the death of Wenceslaus III, king of Bohemia and Poland, the right to the Polish crown was disputed, being claimed by various Piast dukes as well as the successors of Wenceslaus III on the Bohemian throne. In 1327, John of Bohemia invaded Poland in order to gain the Polish crown. After the intervention of King Charles I of Hungary he left Polonia Minor, but on his way back he enforced his supremacy over the Upper Silesian Piasts. In February 1327, five principalities were carved out of Polish Upper Silesia and placed under Bohemian suzerenity: Duchy of Niemodlin, Duchy of Cieszyn, Duchy of Racibórz, Duchy of Koźle and Bytom and the Duchy of Oświęcim and Zator. In April the dukes of Opole and Wrocław also became the tributaries of king John.

In 1329, Władysław I the Elbow-high started a war with the Teutonic Order. The Order was supported by John of Bohemia who managed to enforce his supremacy over the dukes of Masovia and Lower Silesia. In April–May 1329, following Lower Silesian duchies became subjects of the Bohemian crown: Ścinawa, Oleśnica, Żagań, Legnica-Brzeg and Jawor. In 1331 the Duchy of Głogów separated from Poland as well.

The last independent Silesian Piast – Bolko II of Świdnica – died in 1368. His wife Agnes ruled the Świdnica duchy until her death in 1392. From that time on, all remaining Silesian Piasts were vassals of the Bohemian crown, although they maintained their sovereign rights.

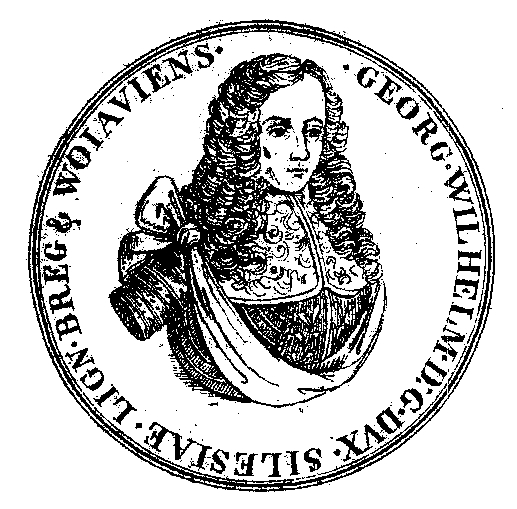
The last legitimate Silesian Piast – George William, Duke of Liegnitz

In 1335, John of Bohemia renounced his claim to the title of king of Poland in favour of Casimir the Great, who in return renounced his claims to Silesia. This was formalized in the treaties of Trenčín and Visegrád, ratified in 1339.

The division into small and smallest territories led to a decline of prestige and power. Many Silesian Piasts now merely had the status of squires with greater rights. Some Piasts entered foreign services as mercenary leaders, like John II of Glogau and Sagan. Henry IX traveled through Europe as a goliard. The descent of the dynasty was also illustrated by the marriages of the dukes. The Silesian Piasts of the 13th and 14th century married into princely families especially from German families, but also other European royal lines, whereas later Piasts also married non-princely and even bourgeois women.

With the adoption of the Protestant faith in Silesia, the Piasts again gained importance. Against the Catholic Habsburg dynasty, which ruled Silesia since 1526, the dukes sought political support by entering matrimonies with Protestant, imperial rulers like the Hohenzollern dynasty. Their last attempts of independent policies were the candidatures of Frederick II of Liegnitz for the Bohemian crown (1526) and of Henry XI (1573), Frederick IV (1576) and Christian (1668) for the Polish crown.

During the 15th, 16th and 17th centuries, various branches of the Silesian Piasts became extinct. In 1532, the last Duke of Opole, John II the Good, died, leaving most of Upper Silesia under direct Bohemian rule. In 1675, the last legitimate Silesian Piast – George William, Duke of Liegnitz – died. The last male Silesian Piast was baron Ferdinand II Hohenstein, who died in 1706, the last female Piast, Charlotte, died in 1707.

== Silesian Piasts and Poland ==
The Silesian Piasts formed the oldest branch of the first Polish royal dynasty. This was the reason that even after the fragmentation of Poland their interest in Polish matters was still strong. Norman Davies stated that the dynastic loyalty of all Piast dukes as well as a single ecclesiastic organisation still secured the unity of the divided Kingdom of Poland. In his opinion the alleged "will" to separate from Poland is contradicted by the continuous involvement of the Silesian Piasts in Polish affairs. He remarks that the dukes of Silesia did not break their connections with their relatives in the rest of Poland. The most visible evidence of this is said to be the fact that in the 13th century three Silesian Dukes – Henry I, Henry II and Henry IV – took control of Kraków and therefore of the senior throne of the whole of Poland.

In Davies' opinion, the Germanisation of Silesia did not necessarily mean a desire to move apart from Poland. He suggests that it was more likely a way to satisfy the Silesian Piasts' ambitions inside Poland. The planned introduction of German settlers would strengthen Silesia, and also the Silesian Piast claims to the senioral throne in Kraków. Only when the Silesian Piasts' ambitions to rule in Kraków were thwarted did they decide to set their province on a different course.

According to German scholars, by the 14th century, the Silesian Piasts were viewed as Germans on par with the other dukes of the Holy Roman Empire, at least to a much larger degree than dukes of Bohemia and Moravia.

== Family tree of Silesian Piasts ==
Bolesław III Wrymouth duke of Poland; HOUSE OF PIAST
Władysław II the Exile duke of Silesia; BRANCH OF SILESIA	Mieszko III the Old duke of Greater Poland; BRANCH OF GREATER POLAND	Casimir II the Just duke of Masovia; BRANCH OF LESSER POLAND
Bolesław I the Tall duke of Wrocław	Mieszko I Tanglefoot duke of Opole; BRANCH OF OPOLE	Konrad Laskonogi duke of Glogów
Jarosław bishop of Wrocław	Henry I the Bearded duke of Wrocław
Henry II the Pious duke of Wrocław	Konrad the Curly prince
Bolesław II the Horned duke of Wrocław	Mieszko duke of Lubusz	Henry III the White duke of Wrocław	Konrad I duke of Głogów; BRANCH OF GŁOGÓW	Ladislaus archbishop of Salzburg
Henry V duke of Wrocław, Legnica, Brzeg	Bolko I the Strict duke of Lwówek; BRANCH OF ZIẸBICE	Bernard the Lightsome duke of Lwówek	Henry IV duke of Wrocław
Bolesław III the Generous duke of Legnica, Brzeg	Henry VI the Good duke of Wrocław	Władysław duke of Legnica	Bernhard duke of Swindica	Henry I duke of Jawor	Bolko II duke of Ziębice
Wenceslaus I duke of Legnica; BRANCH OF LEGNICA	Louis I duke of Brzeg	Bolko II the Small duke of Swindica	Henry II duke of Swindica	Nicholas the Small duke of Ziębice
Rupert I duke of Legnica	Wenceslaus II bishop of Lebus, Wrocław	Bolesław IV duke of Legnica	Henry VIII duke of Legnica	Henry VII duke of Brzeg	Bolko III duke of Ziębice	Henry I duke of Ziębice
Henry IX duke of Brzeg	Louis II duke of Oława	John I duke of Ziębice	Henry II duke of Ziębice
Rupert II duke of Lubin	Wenceslaus III duke of Oława	Louis III duke of Oława
John I duke of Lüben	Henry I duke of Haynau
Frederick I duke of Legnica
John II duke of Legnica	Frederick II duke of Legnica	George I duke of Brzeg
Frederick III duke of Legnica	George II duke of Brzeg
Henry XI duke of Legnica	Frederick IV duke of Legnica	Joachim Frederick duke of Brzeg	John George duke of Oława
John Christian duke of Brzeg	George Rudolf duke of Legnica
George III duke of Brzeg	Louis IV duke of Legnica	Christian duke of Brzeg
George William duke of Legnica

== Silesian Piasts, branch of Opole ==
Władysław II duke of Silesia; SILESIAN PIASTS
Bolesław I the Tall duke of Wrocław	Mieszko I Tanglefoot duke of Opole; BRANCH OF OPOLE
Casimir I duke of Opole
Mieszko II the Fat duke of Opole	Władysław duke of Opole
Mieszko I duke of Cieszyn	Casimir duke of Bytom; BRANCH OF BYTOM	Bolko I duke of Opole; BRANCH OF STRZELCE	Przemysław duke of Racibórz
Władysław duke of Oświęcim	Casimir I duke of Cieszyn	Bolesław archbishop of Esztergom	Władysław duke of Bytom	Siemowit duke of Bytom	George duke of Bytom	Mieszko bishop of Nitra, Veszprém	Bolesław the Elder duke of Wieluń	Bolko II duke of Opole	Albert duke of Strzelce	Leszek duke of Racibórz
Jan I the Scholastic duke of Oświęcim	Władysław prince, heir	Bolesław prince, heir	Przemyslaus I duke of Cieszyn	Jan cleric	Siemowit; Teutonic knight	Casimir duke of Koźle	Bolesław duke of Bytom	Boleslaw II duke of Niemodlin	Wenceslaus duke of Niemodlin	Henry duke of Niemodlin	Vladislaus II duke of Opole	Bolko III duke of Strzelce	Henry duke of Opole
Jan II duke of Oświęcim	Przemysław duke of Oświęcim	Bolesław I duke of Cieszyn; BRANCH OF CIESZYN	Jan Kropidło bishop of Poznań	Bolko IV duke of Opole	Henry II duke of Niemodlin	Bernard duke of Niemodlin
Jan III duke of Oświęcim	Casimir duke of Oświęcim	Wenceslaus I duke of Cieszyn	Władysław duke of Głogów	Przemysław II duke of Cieszyn	Bolesław II duke of Cieszyn	Bolko V the Hussite duke of Opole	Jan I duke of Opole	Nicholas I duke of Strzelce
Wenceslaus I duke of Zator	Przemysław duke of Toszek	Jan IV duke of Oświęcim	Casimir II duke of Cieszyn	Louis duke of Opole	Jan II the Good duke of Opole	Nicholas II duke of Strzelce
Casimir II duke of Zator	Wenceslaus II duke of Zator	Jan V duke of Zator	Władysław duke of Zator	Frederick prince, heir	Wenceslaus II duke of Cieszyn
Wenceslaus III Adam duke of Cieszyn
Frederick Casimir duke of Cieszyn	Adam Wenceslaus duke of Cieszyn
Frederick William duke of Cieszyn

== Silesian Piasts, branch of Głogów ==
Henry II the Pious duke of Wrocław, Kraków; SILESIAN PIASTS
Bolesław II Rogatka duke of Wrocław	Konrad I duke of Głogów; BRANCH OF GŁOGÓW
Henry III duke of Głogów	Konrad II the Hunchback patriarch of Aquileia	Przemko duke of Ścinawa
Henry IV the Faithful duke of Żagań	Konrad I duke of Oleśnica; BRANCH OF OLEŚNICA	Bolesław duke of Oleśnica	John duke of Ścinawa	Przemko II duke of Głogów
Henry V of Iron duke of Żagań	Konrad II the Gray duke of Oleśnica
Henry VI the Elder duke of Żagań-Głogów	Henry VII Rumpold duke of Żagań-Głogów	Henry VIII the Sparrow duke of Żagań–Głogów	Konrad III the Old duke of Oleśnica
Jan I duke of Żagań-Głogów	Henryk IX Starszy duke of Żagań	Henry X Rumpold duke of Żagań	Wenceslaus of Krosno duke of Krosno	Konrad IV the Elder duke of Oleśnica	Konrad V Kantner duke of Oleśnica	Konrad VI the Dean duke of Oleśnica	Konrad VII the White duke of Oleśnica	Konrad VIII the Younger duke of Oleśnica
Balthasar duke of Żagań-Przewóz	Rudolf duke of Żagań-Przewóz	Wenceslaus duke of Żagań-Przewóz	Jan II the Mad duke of Żagań-Przewóz	Henry XI duke of Głogów	Konrad IX the Black duke of Oleśnica	Konrad X the White duke of Oleśnica

== See also ==
- Piast dynasty
- History of Silesia
- Duchies of Silesia
- History of Poland during the Piast dynasty
- History of the Lands of the Bohemian Crown (Middle Ages)
- History of the Lands of the Bohemian Crown (1526–1648)
- Kingdom of Bohemia
- History of Germany
- History of Poland
- Piast Concept
- Recovered Territories
