= Konrad VI the Dean =

- Duke of Oleśnica, Koźle
- Coat-of-arms of Silesia
- Born: c. 1391
- Died: 3 September 1427
- Noble family: Silesian Piasts of Oleśnica
- Father: Konrad III the Old
- Mother: Judith

Konrad VI the Dean (Polish: Konrad VI Dziekan; c. 1391 – 3 September 1427) was a Duke of Oleśnica, Koźle, half of Bytom and half of Ścinawa since 1416 (with his brothers as co-rulers).

He was the third son of Konrad III the Old, Duke of Oleśnica, by his wife Judith. Like his two older and two younger brothers, at his baptism he received the name of Konrad, which was characteristic in this branch of the House of Piast.

== Life ==
After his father's death in 1412, Konrad VI succeeded him in all his lands together with his brothers as co-rulers. In order to avoid the excessive fragmentation of the already small Duchy of Oleśnica, Konrad VI, like his older brother Konrad IV decided to pursue an ecclesiastic career. However, he did not give up public life. The main motive for his career choice was the desire to win greater political influence in Silesia.

Like Konrad IV, Konrad VI's career progressed rapidly. In 1413 he was appointed Canon of the Chapter of Wrocław, and one year later was chosen as dean by Bishop Wenceslaus II.

In 1416, after all Konrad III's sons attained majority, they decided to make the formal division of the Duchy. In the division were also included the brothers who had chosen the religious career. The details of this division (except for the towns given to the oldest brother) are unknown. After an analysis of Konrad VI's titles and documents, it is assumed that he held the power directly over half of Ścinawa, Wołów and Lubiąż. However, his rule was only formal, because none of the brothers could sell or divide his districts without the consent of the others.

Despite his spiritual career, most information about Konrad VI is obtained from his secular activities. The most notorious fact of his life was the long-term dispute with the Cisternian Lubiąż Abbey, which even caused him to be excommunicated. The dispute ended only after the intervention of Pope Martin V.

Konrad VI died suddenly on 3 September 1427, and was buried in the Cistercian monastery in Lubiąż.

Preceded by Konrad IV the Elder and Konrad V Kantner	Duke of Oleśnica with Konrad V, Konrad VII and Konrad VIII; 1416–1427	Succeeded by Konrad V Kantner
Preceded by Konrad IV the Elder and Konrad V Kantner	Duke of Koźle with Konrad V, Konrad VII and Konrad VIII; 1416–1427	Succeeded by Konrad VII the White
Preceded by Konrad IV the Elder and Konrad V Kantner	Duke of Bytom (1/2) with Konrad V, Konrad VII and Konrad VIII; 1416–1427	Succeeded by Konrad VII the White
Preceded by Konrad IV the Elder and Konrad V Kantner	Duke of Ścinawa (1/2) with Konrad V, Konrad VII and Konrad VIII; 1416–1427	Succeeded by Konrad VIII the Younger
