= Konrad IV the Elder =

Polish duke and bishop

- Duke of Oleśnica, Koźle
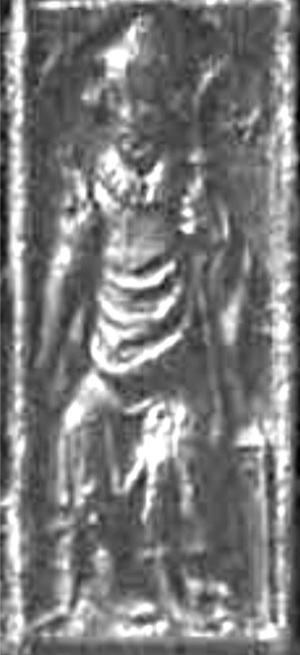

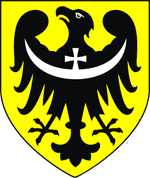
- Coat of arms
- Born: ca. 1384
- Died: 9 August 1447; Jelcz
- Buried: Wrocław Cathedral
- Noble family: Silesian Piasts of Oleśnica
- Father: Konrad III the Old
- Mother: Judith

Konrad IV the Elder (Polish: Konrad IV Starszy, German: Konrad von Oels) (c. 1384 – 9 August 1447) was Duke of Oels (Oleśnica), Koźle, half of Bytom and half of Ścinawa from 1412 to 1416, sharing rule with his brothers. After 1416, he became the sole ruler of Kąty, Bierutów, Prudnik and Syców. In 1417, he assumed the role of Bishop of Wrocław and also held the title of Duke of Nysa.

The son of Konrad III the Old, Duke of Oleśnica, and his wife Judith, Konrad IV the Elder was the eldest of his siblings. His four younger brothers also shared the name of Konrad, but historians distinguish them primarily by letters and regnal numbers.

== Life ==
=== Church career ===
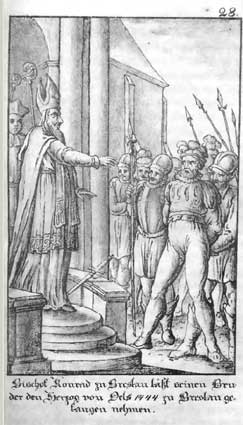
Conrad IV arrests his brother Conrad VII.

Although he was the eldest son and had strong potential to inherit his father's duchy, Konrad IV decided to pursue a religious vocation. He quickly rose through the ranks of the church hierarchy, and by the end of 1399, he had assumed the role of cleric in Wrocław. Within a year, he was elected canon of Wrocław and provost of Domasław/Domslau, although he did not long retain the position. However, in 1410 he was once again elected canon of Wrocław. From 1411 to 1417, he held the position of provost of the chapter. During this time, Konrad IV devoted himself to his candidacy for the bishopric of Warmia, undertaking a long journey to Rome in pursuit of this appointment. Although his campaign for the bishopric was ultimately unsuccessful, he was awarded a master's degree and appointed to a papal notary. In 1412, he also assumed the role of canon of Olomouc.

After the resignation of the bishop of Wrocław, Duke Wenceslaus II of Legnica, on 17 December 1417, Pope Martin V appointed Konrad IV as the new bishop of Wrocław. He received his episcopal consecration on 22 January 1418 from John Tylemann, a suffragan bishop of the Kolegiata of St. Nicholas in Otmuchów.

=== Beginning of his involvement in politics ===
In addition to his ecclesiastical duties, Konrad IV took an active part in politics. In 1402, he joined the newly formed Alliance of Silesian Princes. In 1409, he supported his father at the side of King Wenceslaus IV of Bohemia during the truce negotiations between Poland and the Teutonic Knights. In 1412, Konrad IV served as a mediator in the conflict among the Dukes of Opole, King Wenceslaus IV, and the city of Wrocław. Later, in 1416, he and his brothers allied themselves with Michael Küchmeister von Sternberg, the Grand Master of the Teutonic Order, against the Kingdom of Poland.

After the death of his father in 1412, Konrad IV became Duke of Oleśnica, co-ruling with his younger brother Konrad V Kantner. In 1416, in order to advance his ecclesiastical career, Konrad IV relinquished most of his rule over the duchy in favor of Konrad V and his other younger brothers. However, he retained control over several towns within the duchy, including Kąty (Kanth), Bierutów (Bernstadt), Prudnik, and Syców.

During his tenure as ruler of the Diocese of Wrocław and the Duchy of Nysa-Otmuchów, Konrad IV faced the challenges of the Hussite Wars, a period of significant political upheaval that greatly influenced the duke-bishop's policies.

=== The Hussite Wars ===
In the early months of 1420, Konrad IV met with other Silesian princes in the Silesian Sejm in Wrocław and paid homage to Emperor Sigismund. He then accompanied the emperor to Prague, where Sigismund was crowned king of Bohemia. Konrad IV remained loyal to the House of Luxembourg even after the loss of the German Kingdom, retaining authority only over Silesia. He helped organize a campaign against crime in the Silesian lands, which resulted in the occupation of Broumov.

In recognition of his contributions, the Emperor appointed Konrad IV to Governor of Silesia with the official responsibility of organizing the fight against the Hussites in 1422.

In January 1423, Konrad IV participated in negotiations for a possible alliance between Emperor Sigismund and the Teutonic Order against King Władysław II of Poland. The agreement provided for territorial gains for the Silesian princes in the event of a Polish defeat. However, the treaty was not honored, as King Władysław II received the Emperor's refusal to join the alliance after their meeting at Kežmarok. Following the example of his sovereign, in April 1424, Konrad IV restored relations with Poland and joined his brother Konrad V in Kalisz.

In 1425, Konrad IV led a new crusade, organized by the Kingdom of Bohemia against the Hussites, which was ultimately unsuccessful.

Beginning in 1427, the Hussites retaliated against the allies of Emperor Sigismund with a series of military expeditions. During these campaigns they devastated Lusatia, Złotoryja and Lubań.

To counter the Hussite threat, the Silesian princes and several major cities, including Wrocław and Świdnica, sought mutual aid from Konrad IV and offered him leadership of the coalition. The fear of these cities and princes became evident the following year when a Hussite army led by Prokop the Great invaded Silesia. Most of the princes made deals with Prokop, guaranteeing the safety of their estates in exchange for a substantial ransom and unimpeded passage through their territories.

Despite the treachery of some princes, Konrad IV chose to fight, supported by a contingent led by Duke Jan of Ziębice. The Battle of Stary Wielisław near Nysa took place on 27 August 1428. The coalition forces were decisively defeated, resulting in the death of Duke Jan of Ziębice. However, Konrad IV managed to escape.

After the battle, Prokop's army devastated large parts of Lower and Upper Silesia, particularly targeting the possessions of the Bishopric of Wrocław. In search of protection, Konrad IV forged a closer alliance with Duke Bolko V of Opole, one of the most prominent Hussite leaders among the Silesian princes.

In the following years, despite the defeat of 1428, Konrad IV continued to wage war against the Hussites in Silesia, receiving support from the majority of the Wroclaw nobility.

In 1430, a new Hussite expedition, supported by the Polish mercenary Sigismund Korybut, advanced from the northwest. As a result, Konrad IV lost two important fortresses, Niemcza and Otmuchów, which he regained five years later by buying them from Hussite commanders.

In 1432, Konrad IV's own Duchy of Oleśnica, including the monasteries of Lubiąż and Trzebnica, suffered severe damage when Oleśnica itself was burned.

In 1433, in order to protect the property of the Church, Konrad IV decided to revive the Union of Silesian Princes (Związek książąt śląskich) and once again assumed the position of its leader.

=== Civil war in Silesia ===
In 1437, the death of the Holy Roman Emperor and King of Bohemia, Sigismund, triggered a civil war in Bohemia and Silesia. Before his death, Sigismund named his son-in-law, Albert V of Habsburg, as his successor to all of his possessions. However, a faction of the electors chose Casimir, the younger brother of the King of Poland, as their preferred candidate.

On Albert V's side, Konrad IV played a key role in the decisive battle that ensued in 1438. The Polish army attempted to rally the Silesian princes to recognize Casimir as King of Bohemia through a swift attack. However, Konrad IV and his brother Konrad V, aided by the unexpected arrival of the formidable Austrian army, convinced the Polish troops to retreat.

The relative peace in Silesia was short-lived, lasting less than two years. In 1440, another double election of the King of Bohemia took place. This time the candidates were Władysław, the posthumous son of Albert V, and Władysław III, King of Poland and Hungary. The situation became much more complex as both candidates gained considerable support. In particular, Konrad IV remained loyal to the Habsburg cause, while his younger brother, Konrad VII the White, sided with the Polish king. The ensuing protracted conflict further devastated the Silesian lands and the chaos was further exacerbated by a new Hussite expedition in 1444.

=== Financial difficulties and the dispute with the chapter, death ===
Konrad IV's extensive involvement in political affairs and prolonged wars had a significant impact on the bishopric, resulting in a substantial debt of 8,500 Hungarian guilders at the time of his death. This financial burden created a difficult situation for his successors.

A notable aspect of Konrad IV's financial activities was his encouragement of Pope Eugene IV to condemn simony in Basel. This prompted the chapter to investigate the matter, which revealed that Konrad IV had amassed considerable sums of money from both Western and Orthodox churches within the diocese. As a result, on 1 August 1444, the chapter formally decided to depose Konrad IV, citing his substantial personal debts and lack of funds to maintain his court. Pope Eugene IV, however, refused to endorse this decision and, by papal bull on 21 July 1445, ordered the reinstatement of Konrad IV as bishop.

In 1446, a final reconciliation was effected, with pressure from Konrad IV's military forces, between Konrad IV and the chapter. This reconciliation allowed him to implement diocesan statutes aimed at reforming ecclesiastical life in Wrocław.

Konrad IV died in Jelcz on the evening of 9 August 1447. He was buried in the Wrocław Cathedral.

Preceded by Konrad III the Old	Duke of Oleśnica with Konrad V 1412–1416	Succeeded by Konrad V Kantner; Konrad VI the Dean; Konrad VII the White; Konrad VIII the Younger
Preceded by Konrad III the Old	Duke of Koźle with Konrad V 1412–1416	Succeeded by Konrad V Kantner; Konrad VI the Dean; Konrad VII the White; Konrad VIII the Younger
Preceded by Konrad III the Old	Duke of Bytom (1/2) with Konrad V 1412–1416	Succeeded by Konrad V Kantner; Konrad VI the Dean; Konrad VII the White; Konrad VIII the Younger
Preceded by Konrad III the Old	Duke of Ścinawa (1/2) with Konrad V 1412–1416	Succeeded by Konrad V Kantner; Konrad VI the Dean; Konrad VII the White; Konrad VIII the Younger
Preceded by Wenceslaus II	Duke of Nysa; 1417–1447	Succeeded by Piotr II Nowak
Preceded by Wenceslaus II	Bishop of Wroclaw; 1417–1447	Succeeded by Piotr II Nowak
