= 1452 =

1452 in various calendars
- Gregorian calendar: 1452; MCDLII
- Ab urbe condita: 2205
- Armenian calendar: 901; ԹՎ ՋԱ
- Assyrian calendar: 6202
- Balinese saka calendar: 1373–1374
- Bengali calendar: 858–859
- Berber calendar: 2402
- English Regnal year: 30 Hen. 6 – 31 Hen. 6
- Buddhist calendar: 1996
- Burmese calendar: 814
- Byzantine calendar: 6960–6961
- Chinese calendar: 辛未年 (Metal Goat); 4149 or 3942 — to — 壬申年 (Water Monkey); 4150 or 3943
- Coptic calendar: 1168–1169
- Discordian calendar: 2618
- Ethiopian calendar: 1444–1445
- Hebrew calendar: 5212–5213
- Hindu calendars
- Vikram Samvat: 1508–1509
- Shaka Samvat: 1373–1374
- Kali Yuga: 4552–4553
- Holocene calendar: 11452
- Igbo calendar: 452–453
- Iranian calendar: 830–831
- Islamic calendar: 855–856
- Japanese calendar: Hōtoku 4 / Kyōtoku 1 (享徳元年)
- Javanese calendar: 1367–1368
- Julian calendar: 1452; MCDLII
- Korean calendar: 3785
- Minguo calendar: 460 before ROC 民前460年
- Nanakshahi calendar: −16
- Thai solar calendar: 1994–1995
- Tibetan calendar: ལྕགས་མོ་ལུག་ལོ་ (female Iron-Sheep); 1578 or 1197 or 425 — to — ཆུ་ཕོ་སྤྲེ་ལོ་ (male Water-Monkey); 1579 or 1198 or 426

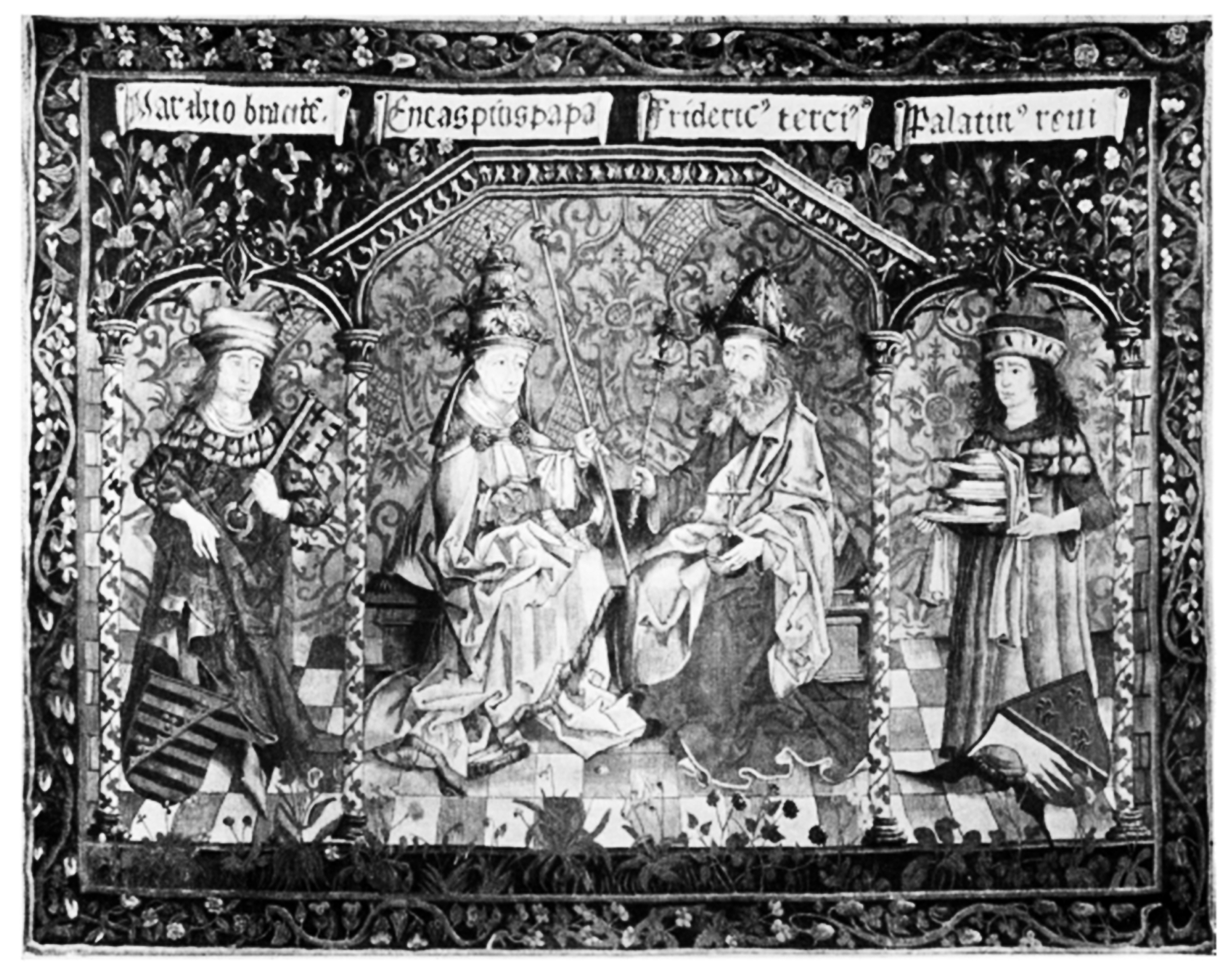
March 19: Frederick III is crowned as the new Holy Roman Emperor at Rome.

Year 1452 (MCDLII) was a leap year starting on Saturday of the Julian calendar.

== Events ==
=== January–March ===
- January 19 – In Mongolia, Taisun Khan, the reigning khagan of the Northern Yuan dynasty, is killed while fleeing after a defeat at Turfan in a war with Esen Taishi. Taisun's younger brother, Agbarjin, becomes the new khagan.
- February 22 – William Douglas, 8th Earl of Douglas is killed by James II of Scotland, at Stirling Castle.
- February – Alexăndrel retakes the throne of Moldavia, in his long struggle with Petru Aron.
- March 17 – Reconquista – Battle of Los Alporchones (around the city of Lorca in Murcia): The combined forces of the Kingdom of Castile, and its subsidiary kingdom of Murcia, defeat the Emirate of Granada.
- March 19 – Frederick III, Holy Roman Emperor, becomes the last to be crowned in Rome.
- March 31 – In an attempt to end the rebellion in Ghent, Philip the Good, Duke of Burgundy, declares war against the Ghentenaar rebels.

=== April–June ===
- April 27 – George of Poděbrady is elected as regent of Bohemia until King Ladislaus of Hungary reaches the age of majority.
- May 2 – Jean Bréhal, chief of the French inquisition, reopens the case of Joan of Arc, who had been executed more than 20 years earlier for heresy and begins taking testimony from witnesses.
- May 4 – Pope John XI of Alexandria, leader of the Coptic Christian church since 1427, dies, leaving a vacancy in the Coptic papacy.
- May 18 – The Battle of Brechin is fought in Scotland between the royalist supporters of Clan Gordon (led by Alexander Gordon, 1st Earl of Huntly) and the rebels of Clan Lindsay, led by Alexander Lindsay, 4th Earl of Crawford. Clan Gordon wins and the Lindsays submit to the authority of King James II.
- May 20 – China's Emperor Daizhong, brother of the former emperor Yingzong, designates his son as the new heir to the throne, demoting Daizhong's son Zhu Jianshen and placing his own son, Zhu Janji, as next in line for the throne.
- June 18 – Pope Nicholas V issues the bull Dum Diversas, legitimising the colonial slave trade.

=== July–September ===
- July 21 – The League of God's House signs a peace treaty with the counts of Ortenstein in the Swiss Canton of Graubünden to fund the rebuilding of Ortenstein Castle, as long as they promise never to use the castle against the League.
- July 26 – The University of Valence is founded in France by the Dauphin Louis, son of King Charles VII. The university lasts for 330 years until being closed during the French Revolution.
- August 10 (25th day of 7th month of Hōtoku 4 – The Kyōtoku era is proclaimed in Japan during the reign of the Emperor Go-Hanazono.
- September 14 – Serbian General Thomas Kantakouzenos leads troops in an invasion of the Principality of Zeta but is driven back by the Prince of Zeta, Stefan Crnojević.
- September 23 – Pope Matthew II of Alexandria is elected as the new Patriarch of the Coptic Christian Church, succeeding Pope John XI, who died on May 4.

=== October–December ===
- October 17 – English troops under John Talbot, 1st Earl of Shrewsbury, land in Guyenne, in France, in order to recapture and retake most of the Guyenne province.
- October 23 – The Earl of Shrewsbury and his army capture Bordeaux, capital of Gascony, after having taken back most of the province without resistance.
- October – Byzantine–Ottoman Wars: The Ottoman governor of Thessaly, Turakhan Beg, breaks through the Hexamilion wall for the fourth time, and ravages the Peloponnese Peninsula to prevent the Byzantine Despotate of the Morea from assisting Constantinople, during the final Ottoman siege of the imperial capital.
- November 23 – The Canton of Appenzell becomes an associate member of the Swiss Confederacy. Full membership will be granted more than 50 years later in 1513.
- December 12 – Isidore of Kiev, the Latin Patriarch of Constantinople, proclaims the union of the Greek and Latin churches at the Hagia Sophia in hopes of an alliance with Western Christians to prevent the loss of Constantinople to the Ottoman Turks.

=== Date unknown ===
- A major volcanic eruption, 1452/1453 mystery eruption, has a subsequent global cooling effect (the eruption releases more sulfate than any other event in the previous 700 years).
- Portuguese navigator Diogo de Teive discovers the islands of Corvo and Flores, in the Azores.
- Battle of Bealach nam Broig, a Scottish clan battle.
- Edinburgh officially becomes the capital of the Kingdom of Scotland.

== Births ==
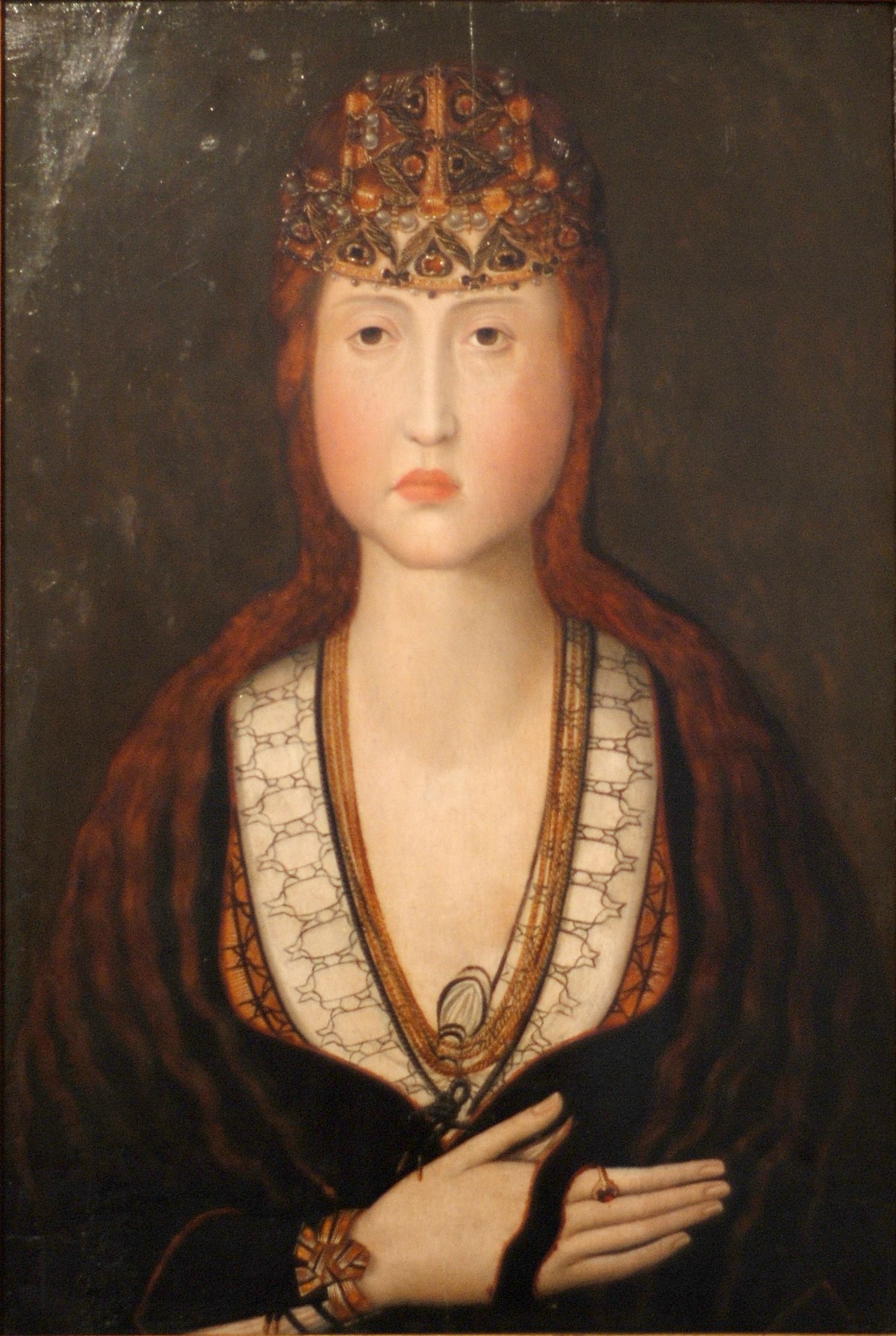
Joanna, Princess of Portugal

- February 6 – Joanna, Princess of Portugal (d. 1490)
- February 14
  - Davide Ghirlandaio, Italian painter and mosaicist (d. 1525)
  - Pandolfo Petrucci, tyrant of Siena (d. 1512)
- March 10 – King Ferdinand II of Aragon, Aragonese king and first king of a united Spain (by marriage to Isabella of Castile) (d. 1516)
- April 15 – Leonardo da Vinci, Italian artist and inventor (d. 1519)
- April 19 – King Frederick of Naples (d. 1504)
- May 18 – Henry the Younger of Poděbrady, Bohemian nobleman (d. 1492)
- July 27
  - Ludovico Sforza, Duke of Milan (d. 1508)
  - Lucrezia Crivelli, mistress of Ludovico Sforza (d. 1534) (approximate date)
- August 12 – Abraham Zacuto, Spanish Jewish astronomer, astrologer, mathematician, rabbi and historian (d. 1515)
- September 21 – Girolamo Savonarola, Italian religious reformer (d. 1498)
- October 2 – King Richard III of England (d. 1485)
- December 6 – Antonio Mancinelli, Italian humanist pedagogue and grammarian (d. 1505)
- December 10 – Johannes Stöffler, German mathematician (d. 1531)
- Date unknown
  - Diogo Cão, Portuguese explorer (d. 1486)
  - Hugh Oldham, English bishop and patron of education (d. 1519)

== Deaths ==
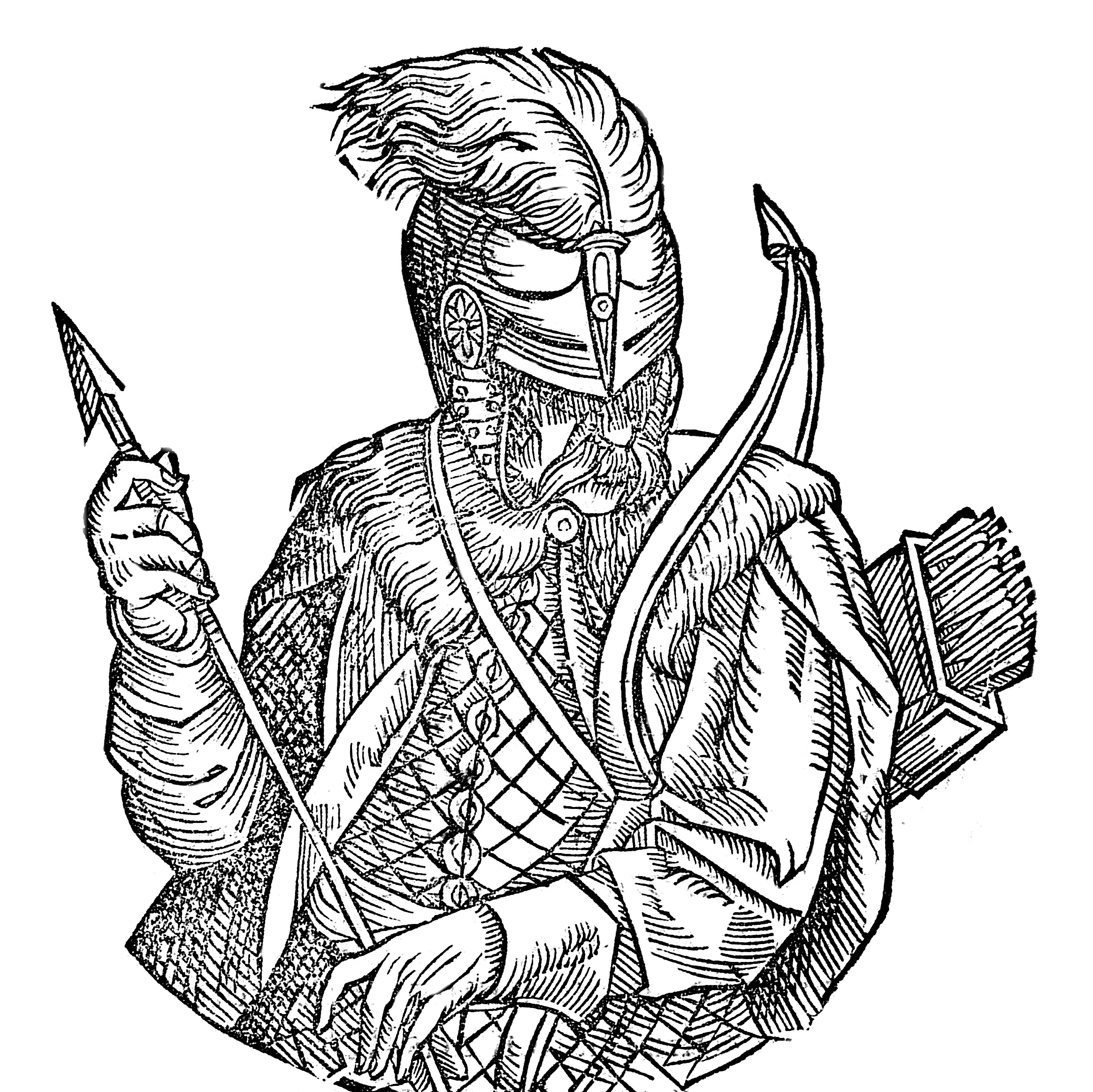
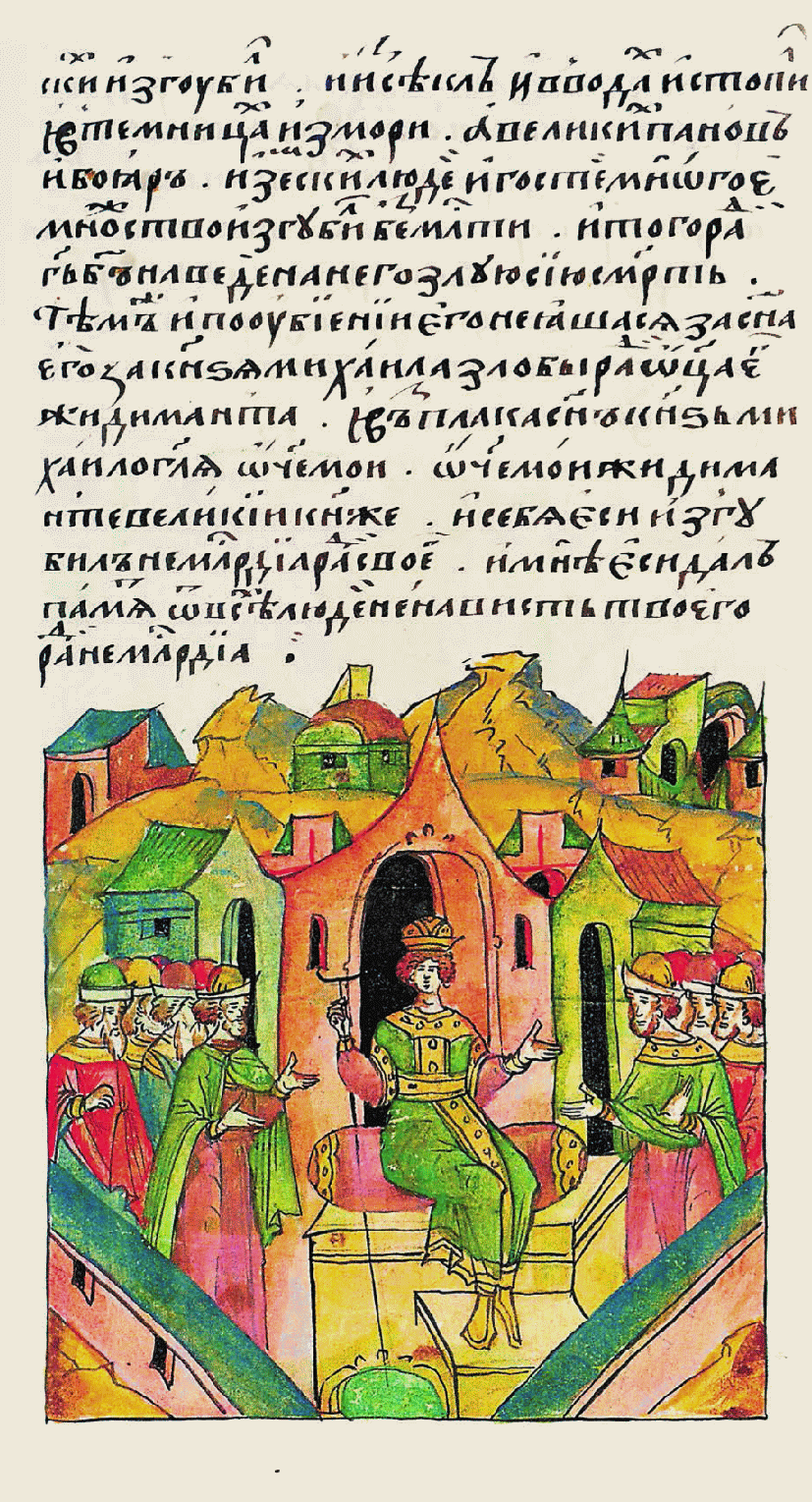
Švitrigaila and Michał Bolesław Zygmuntowicz (Michael Žygimantaitis) died on February 10, 1452

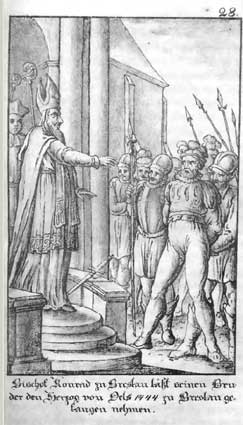
Konrad VII the White

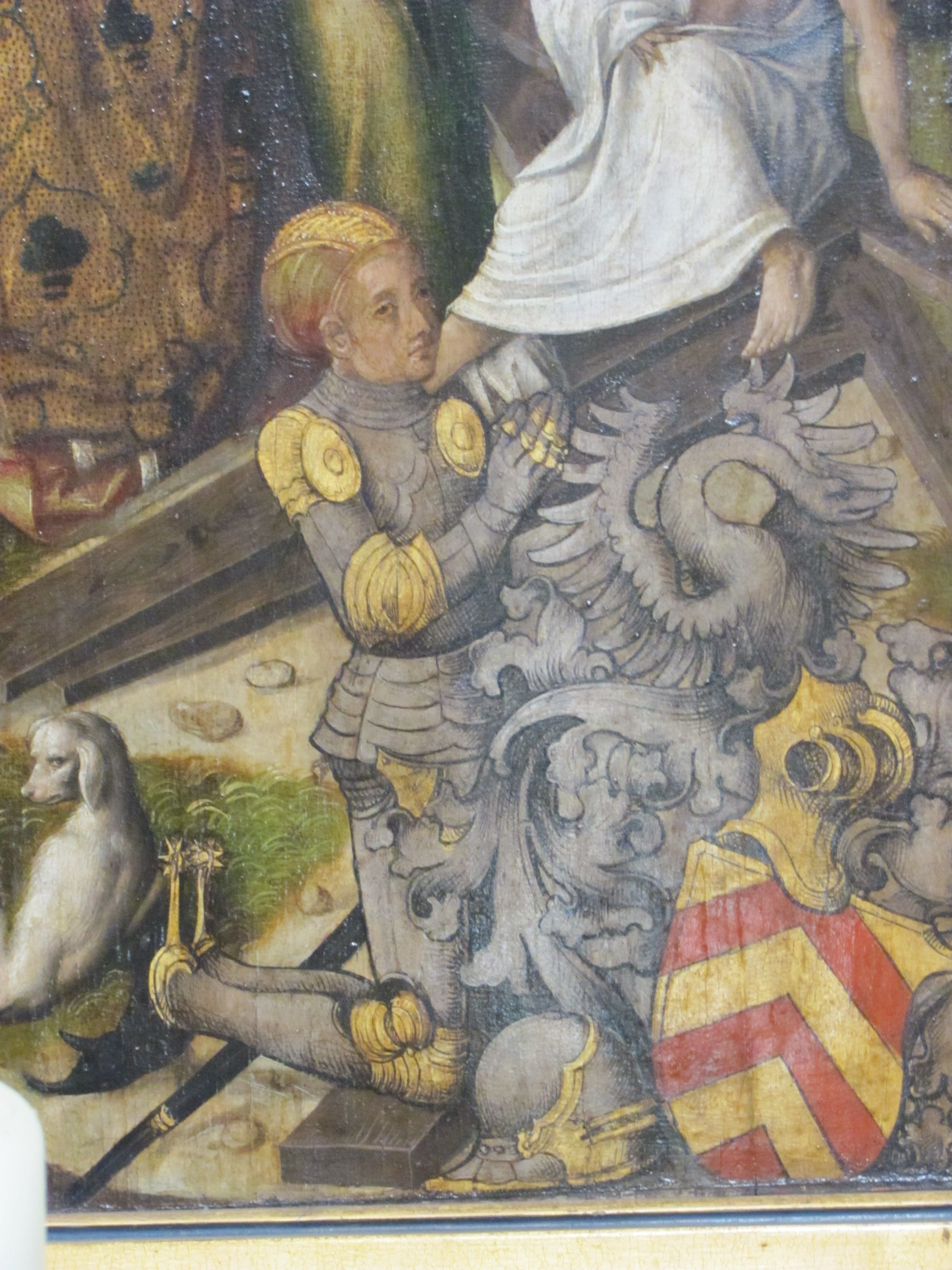
Reinhard III, Count of Hanau

- February 10
  - Švitrigaila, Grand Prince of Lithuania
  - Michał Bolesław Zygmuntowicz (Michael Žygimantaitis), Prince of Black Ruthenia
- February 14 – Konrad VII the White, Duke of Oleśnica
- February 22 – William Douglas, 8th Earl of Douglas (b. 1425)
- April 20 – Reinhard III, Count of Hanau (1451–1452) (b. 1412)
- May – John Stafford, Archbishop of Canterbury
- October – Nicholas Close, English bishop
- probable – Gemistus Pletho, Greek philosopher
