= Ferdinand II Hohenstein =

Ferdinand II von und zu Hohenstein (1681/1682 - 6 April 1706) was the last of the Silesian Piasts. The last ruling Duke of Silesia of the later referred to as Silesian Piasts, was George William, Duke of Liegnitz-Brieg and Wehlau.

Ferdinand II was the grand-grandson of Adam Wenceslaus, Duke of Cieszyn. Son of Ferdinand I Hohenstein and Anna Joanna Closen von Haidenburg, he had epilepsy and died before having any offspring.
