= Konrad II the Gray =

Duke of Oleśnica, Koźle (c. 1340 – 1403)

- Duke of Oleśnica, Koźle
- Coat-of-arms of Oleśnica
- Born: c. 1340
- Died: 10 June 1403
- Noble family: Silesian Piasts of Oleśnica
- Spouse: Agnes of Cieszyn
- Issue: Konrad III the Old
- Father: Konrad I of Oleśnica
- Mother: Euphemia of Bytom

Konrad II the Gray (Polish: Konrad II Siwy) (c. 1340 – 10 June 1403) was a Duke of Oleśnica, Koźle and half of Bytom since 1366 and Duke of half of Ścinawa since 1397 until his death.

He was the second child but only son of Duke Konrad I of Oleśnica by his second wife Euphemia, daughter of Władysław, Duke of Koźle-Bytom.

== Life ==
After the death of his father in 1366, Konrad II inherited all his lands as one and only ruler. Little is known about his rule. In 1377 he named his only son and heir, the future Konrad III, as his co-ruler.

In 1397 he received half of Ścinawa as payment after the death of Henry VIII the Sparrow.

== Marriage and issue ==
By 23 February 1354 Konrad II married with Agnes (b. 1338 – d. by 27 April 1371), daughter of Casimir I, Duke of Cieszyn. They had one son:

1. Konrad III the Old (b. ca. 1359 – d. 28 December 1412).

Preceded by Konrad I	Duke of Oleśnica with Konrad III (since 1377); 1366–1403	Succeeded by Konrad III the Old
Preceded by Konrad I	Duke of Koźle with Konrad III (since 1377); 1366–1403	Succeeded by Konrad III the Old
Preceded by Konrad I	Duke of Bytom (1/2) with Konrad III (since 1377); 1366–1403	Succeeded by Konrad III the Old
Preceded by Henry VIII the Sparrow	Duke of Ścinawa (1/2) with Konrad III; 1397–1403	Succeeded by Konrad III the Old
