= Kąty Wrocławskie =

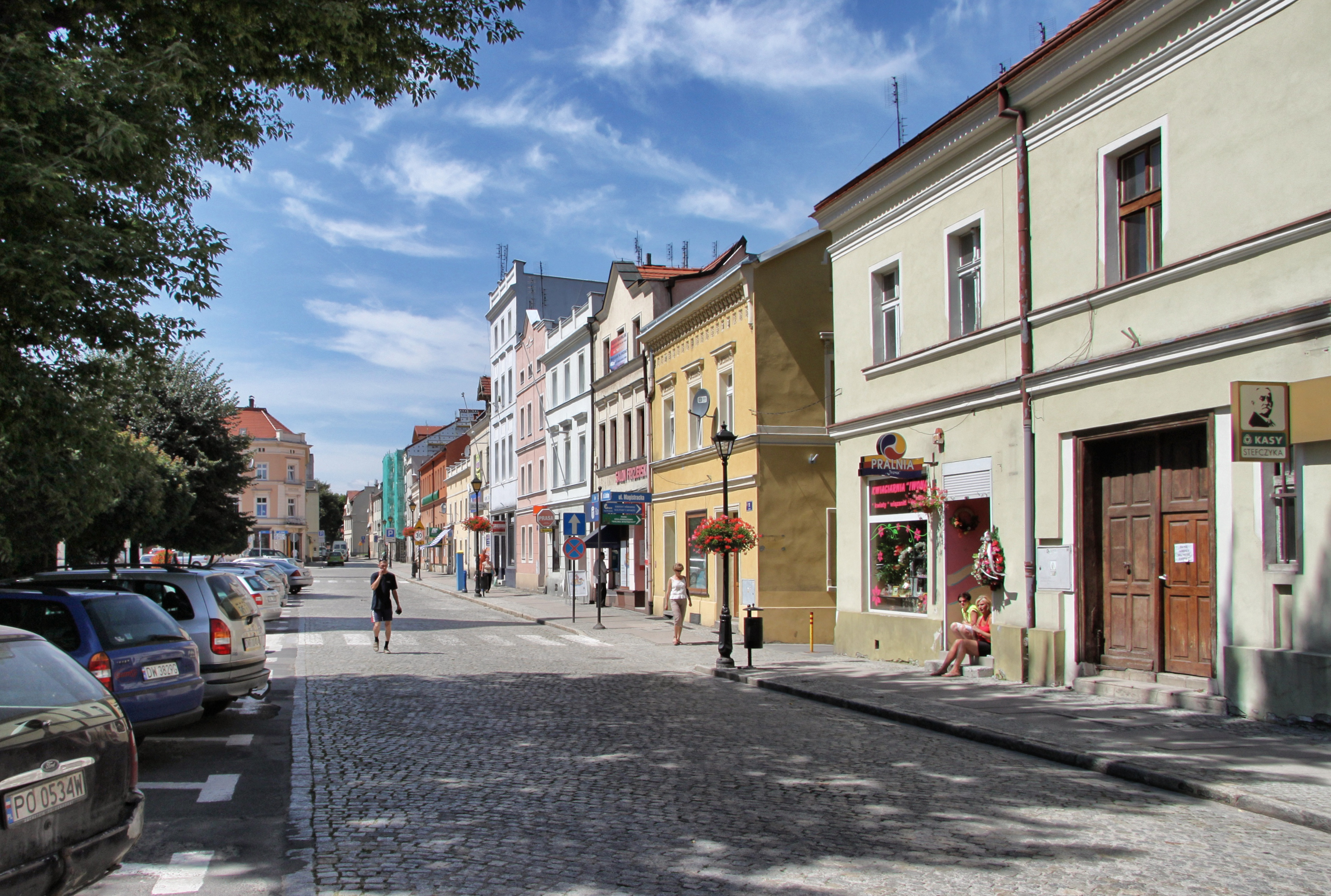
- Fragment of the town square

- Flag Coat of arms

- Location within Poland
- Coordinates: 51°2′N 16°46′E
- Country: Poland
- Voivodeship: Lower Silesian
- County: Wrocław
- Gmina: Kąty Wrocławskie
- Town rights: 1297

Area
  - Total: 6.35 km^{2} (2.45 sq mi)
- Elevation: 138 m (453 ft)

Population (2019-06-30)
  - Total: 6,994
  - Density: 1,100/km^{2} (2,850/sq mi)
- Time zone: UTC+1 (CET)
  - Summer (DST): UTC+2 (CEST)
- Postal code: 55-080
- Vehicle registration: DWR
- Website: katywroclawskie

Kąty Wrocławskie (Polish: [ˈkɔntɨ vrɔˈt͡swafskʲɛ]; German: Kanth), often abbreviated to Kąty, is a town in Wrocław County, Lower Silesian Voivodeship, in south-western Poland. It is the seat of the administrative district (gmina) called Gmina Kąty Wrocławskie. The river Bystrzyca, a tributary of the Oder, flows through the town on the eastern side.

As of 2019, the town has a population of 6,994. It is part of the larger Wrocław metropolitan area.

== History ==
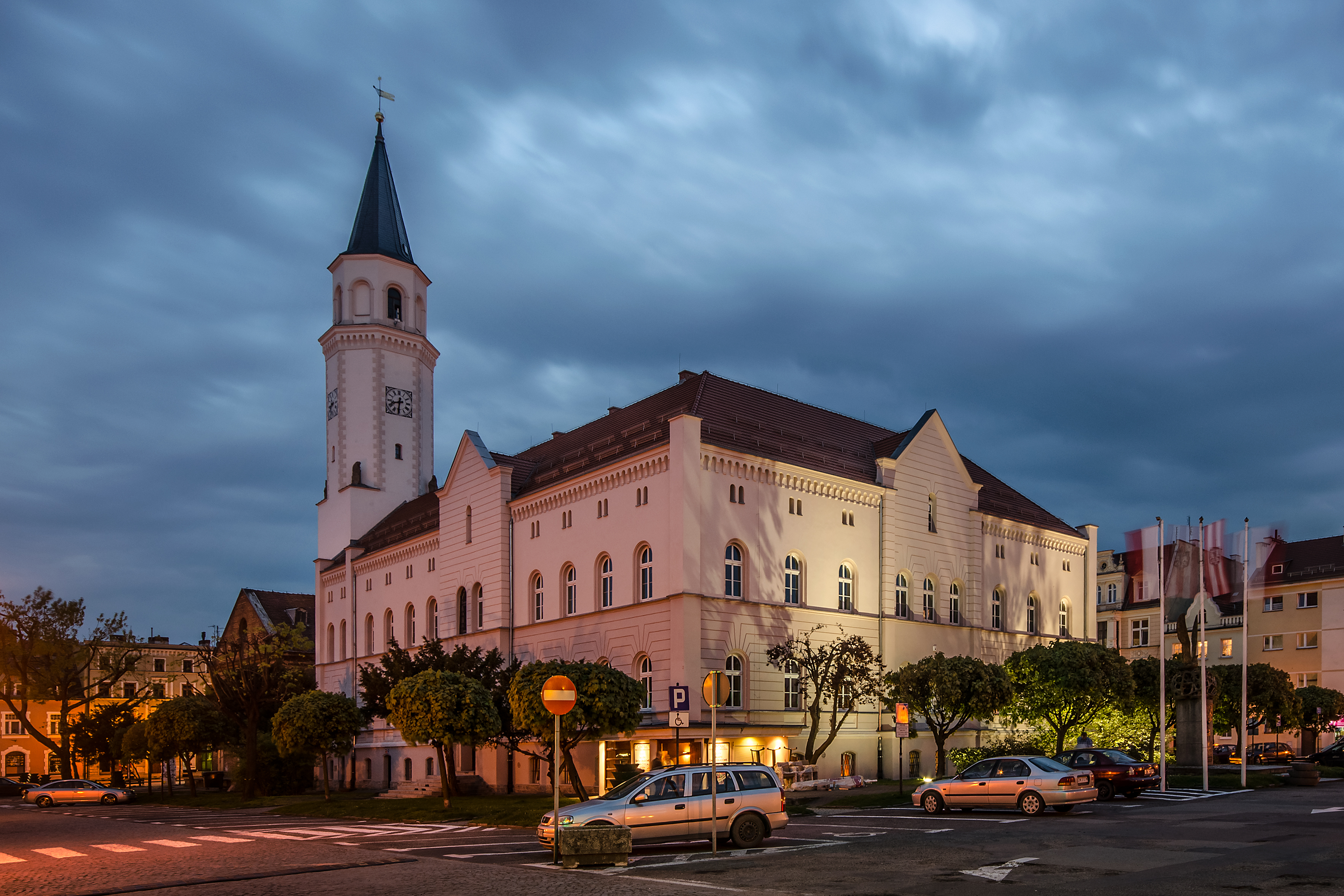
Town hall at the Market Square

In the Early Middle Ages, the region in which Kąty Wrocławskie is in today was inhabited by the Silesians, one of the Polish tribes, which became part of the Polish state after its establishment in the 10th century. The Polish settlement with a wooden church probably already existed in 1101, as mentioned in later centuries. As a result of the 12th-century fragmentation of Poland it was part of various Polish duchies of Lower Silesia, the first being the Duchy of Silesia. A castle already existed in 1293, and remained in possession of the Polish Piast dynasty until 1474.

In 1297 Duke Bolko I the Strict granted town rights modeled after the nearby town of Środa Śląska. In 1298, records show that a town, named Kant was already established. In 1302, more records mention the presence of a hereditary vogt ruling over the town, as well as the existence of a Catholic parish church of Saints Peter and Paul.

In the first years of its existence, Kąty Wrocławskie was ruled by the Polish dukes of Wrocław, and it was only until later that the town became fully sovereign. In 1310, the town became a notable center of trade in the region. The success of the town was helped by the existence of a nearby ford in the river Bystrzyca. In 1322, the town was gifted to the daughter of the Henry VI the Good, who married Konrad I of Oleśnica. From 1329, the town belonged to the Duchy of Jawor-Świdnica, later coming under the control of the Duchy of Ziębice. In 1339, the duke Bolko II the Small sold the town to Konrad II the Gray. In 1419, Konrad IV the Elder, in exchange for a loan, gave the town to the Bishop of Wrocław. Because the loan never got paid back, Kąty Wrocławskie became the property of the Diocese of Wrocław.

In the mid-15th century, Hussites invaded and partially destroyed the town and its walls. Later in the 15th century, a fire severely damaged the town. During the Thirty Years' War the town was plundered several times by various armies, including the Swedes in 1632 and Austrians in 1633. Until 1810 the town remained under the suzerainty of the Diocese of Wrocław. In 1843 a railway connection with Wrocław was opened, the second oldest in Silesia.

== Transport ==
Kąty Wrocławskie railway station serves the town.

== Twin towns – sister cities ==
See twin towns of Kąty Wrocławskie.
