= Konrad VII the White =

- Duke of Oleśnica, Koźle
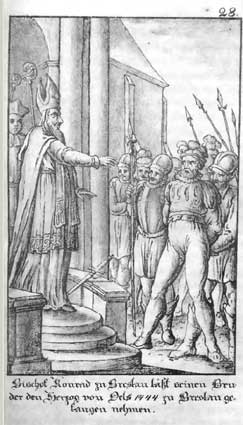
- Conrad IV arrests his brother Conrad VII
- Born: aft. 1396
- Died: 14 February 1452
- Noble family: Silesian Piasts of Oleśnica
- Spouses: Katharina ?Dorothea of Warsaw
- Father: Konrad III the Old
- Mother: Judith

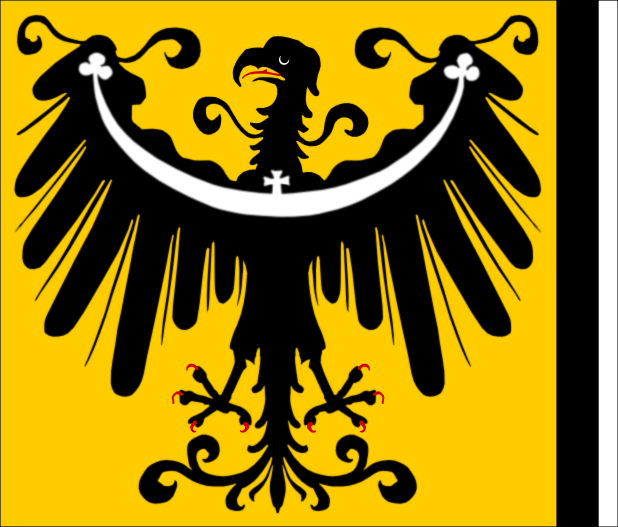
Banner of Konrad the White of Oels

Konrad VII the White (aft. 1396 – 14 February 1452) was a Duke of Oels / Oleśnica, Koźle, half of Bytom and half of Ścinawa during 1416–1427 (with his brothers as co-rulers), sole Duke of Koźle and half of Bytom during 1427–1450, Duke of Oleśnica during 1421–1450 (until 1439 with his brother as co-ruler) and sole Duke of half of Ścinawa during 1447–1450.

He was the fourth son of Konrad III the Old, Duke of Oleśnica, by his wife Judith. Like his three older and one younger brothers, at the baptism he received the name of Konrad, which was characteristic in this branch of the House of Piast.

== Life ==
At a young age, he fought in the famous Battle of Grunwald (1410) on the side of the Teutonic Order and was taken captive by the Polish, but was soon released.

Konrad VII began his rule over the family lands only in 1416, when all his brother (including him) attained his majority. The older brother, Konrad IV renounced in favor of his brothers the government over the Duchy. Konrad VII and his brothers remained as co-rulers until 1427, when a second division of the Duchy was made: Kornad VII obtained Koźle and half of Bytom.

After the death of his brother Konrad V Kantner in 1439, Konrad VII obtain Oleśnica, this time as a regent on behalf of his nephews, Konrad V's sons, who were effectively excluded from the government. After the death of Konrad VIII the Younger (5 September 1444), Konrad VII inherited half of Ścinawa; three years later (9 August 1447), Konrad VII also inherited Kąty (Kanth bis Canth) and Bierutów after Konrad IV's death.

In 1449 he obtained Wołów after the death of his sister-in-law Margareta (widow of Konrad V), who ruled this land as her dower; however, one year later, in 1450, he was finally deposed by the sons of Konrad V. He died two years later.

== Marriages ==
By 2 February 1437 Konrad VII married firstly Katharina (d. bef. 20 Jun 1449), whose origins are unknown. They had no children.

By 7 March 1450 Konrad VII remarried. According to some sources the name of his second wife is unknown, and others stated that she was Dorothea (d. aft. 16 July 1450), daughter of Janusz the Younger, eldest son and heir of Duke Janusz I of Warsaw. Like his first marriage, this union was also childless.

Preceded by Konrad IV the Elder and Konrad V Kantner	Duke of Oleśnica with Konrad V, Konrad VI and Konrad VIII; 1416–1427	Succeeded by Konrad V Kantner
Preceded by Konrad IV the Elder and Konrad V Kantner	Duke of Ścinawa (1/2) with Konrad V, Konrad VII and Konrad VIII; 1416–1427	Succeeded by Konrad VIII the Younger
Preceded by Konrad IV the Elder and Konrad V Kantner	Duke of Koźle with Konrad V, Konrad VI and Konrad VIII (until 1427); 1416–1450	Succeeded by Konrad IX the Black and Konrad X the White
Preceded by Konrad IV the Elder and Konrad V Kantner	Duke of Bytom (1/2) with Konrad V, Konrad VII and Konrad VIII (until 1427); 1416–1450	Succeeded by Konrad IX the Black and Konrad X the White
Preceded by Konrad V Kantner	Duke of Oleśnica; 1439–1450	Succeeded by Konrad IX the Black and Konrad X the White
Preceded by Konrad VIII the Younger	Duke of Ścinawa (1/2); 1444–1450	Succeeded by Konrad IX the Black and Konrad X the White
