= Ścinawa =

Town in Lower Silesian Voivodeship, Poland

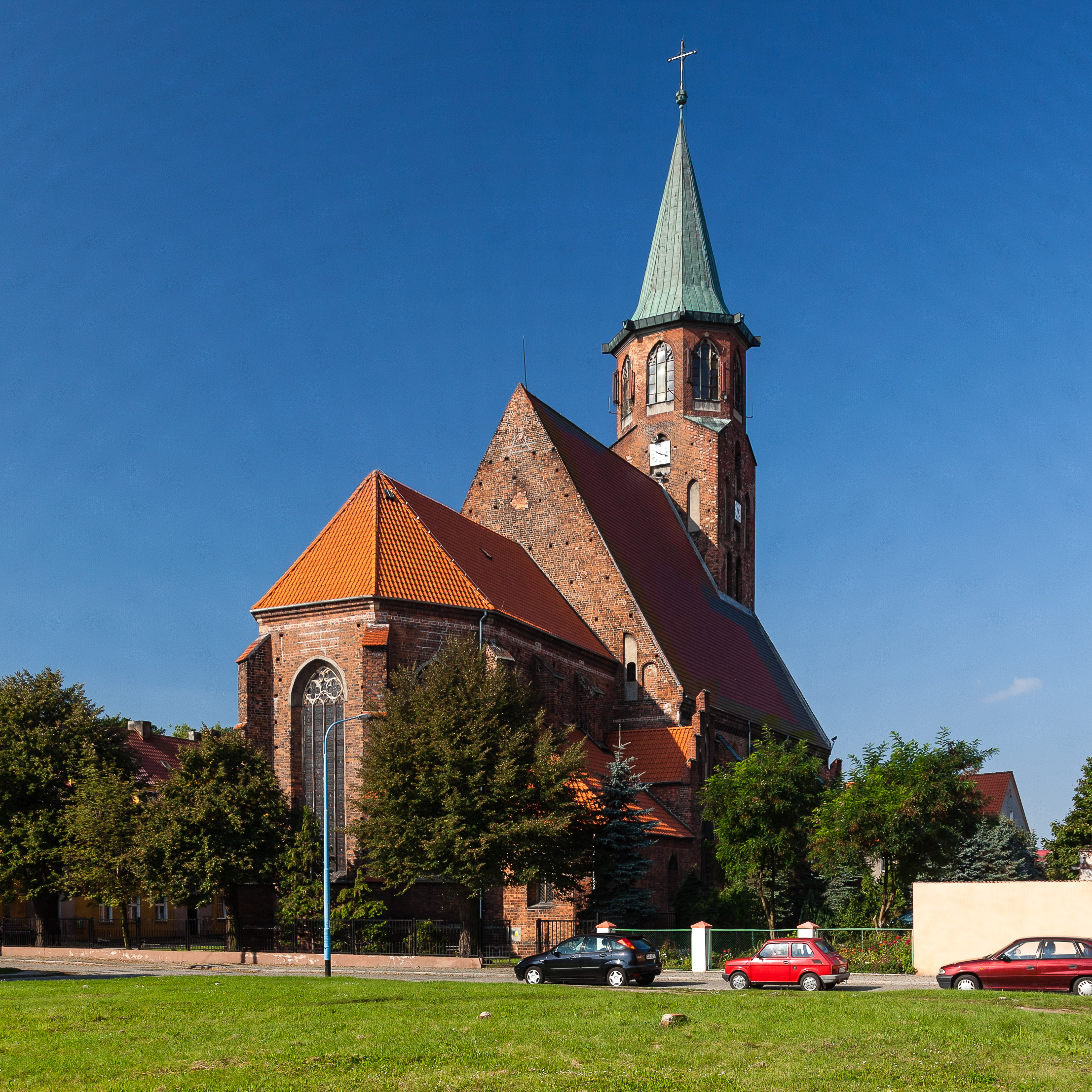
- Exaltation of the Holy Cross Church in Ścinawa

- Coat of arms

- Location within Poland
- Coordinates: 51°24′40″N 16°25′23″E
- Country: Poland
- Voivodeship: Lower Silesian
- County: Lubin
- Gmina: Ścinawa

Government
  - Mayor: Bartek Ratajczak

Area
  - Total: 13.54 km^{2} (5.23 sq mi)

Population (2019-06-30)
  - Total: 5,582
  - Density: 412.3/km^{2} (1,068/sq mi)
- Time zone: UTC+1 (CET)
  - Summer (DST): UTC+2 (CEST)
- Area code: +48 76
- Vehicle registration: DLU
- Website: http://www.scinawa.pl/

Ścinawa (Polish pronunciation: [ɕt͡ɕiˈnava]; German: Steinau an der Oder) is a town and municipality on the Oder river in the Lower Silesian region of Poland. The Ścinawa train station is a key gateway for travel throughout the region, connecting major destinations such as Wrocław and Głogów. As of 2019, the town's population is 5,582. It is part of Lubin County in Lower Silesian Voivodeship, and is the seat of the municipality called Gmina Ścinawa.

== History ==
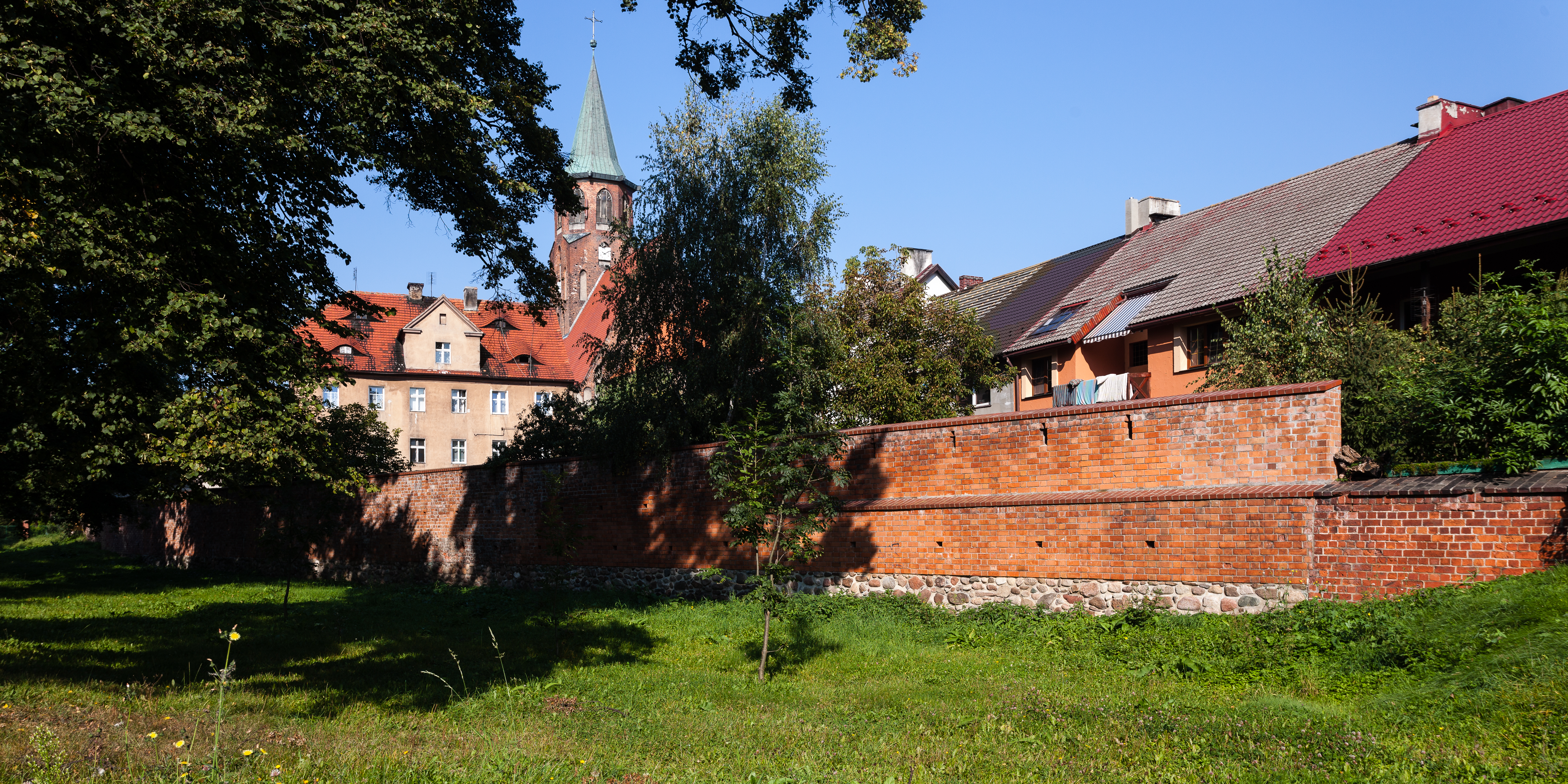
Partially preserved medieval city walls

Ścinawa was first documented as a possession of the newly established Trzebnica Abbey in a deed issued by Pope Innocent III, which dates back to 1202, when it was part of fragmented Poland. Town privileges were first granted between 1248 and 1259 by Konrad I, Duke of Głogów. The town church of St John's was first constructed in 1209.

After the partition of the Duchy of Głogów by Konrad's sons in 1273, Ścinawa became the capital of a duchy in its own right under the rule of Konrad II the Hunchback. It was again united with the Duchy of Głogów under Duke Henry III in 1290. His son John, sole ruler at Ścinawa from 1317, titled himself the "heir of the Kingdom of Poland". He paid homage to King John the Blind in 1329, after which his duchy became a fiefdom of Bohemia. Though the Polish king Casimir III the Great had renounced his claims to Silesia with the 1335 Treaty of Trencin, he campaigned Silesia and in 1343 laid fire to Ścinawa until in 1348 the conflict was finally settled by the Treaty of Namysłów. In 1358 Jan sold half of the Ścinawa to his cousin Duke Bolko II the Small of Świdnica, the only ruler of the Silesian Piasts who had refused to become a Bohemian vassal. Nevertheless, upon Bolko's death in 1368, his half was annexed by Emperor Charles IV. The town was a center of linen and cloth production. The remaining half of the Ścinawa lands fell to Duke Henry V of Iron at Żagań in 1365 and in 1397 was acquired by Duke Konrad II the Gray of Oleśnica.

With the Lands of the Bohemian Crown, Ścinawa since 1526 belonged to the Habsburg monarchy. Under the rule of Duke Frederick II of Legnica, Ścinawa became part of the united duchies of Wołów and Brzeg in 1528. It was heavily devastated during the Thirty Years' War, when in October 1633 Albrecht von Wallenstein's troops nearby routed a Swedish corps under Jindřich Matyáš Thurn. The populace fled to Poland during the war.

Upon the death of the last Piast duke George William in 1675, his lands fell to the House of Habsburg as reverted fiefs. Many craftsmen emigrated afterwards, during the Counter-Reformation. With most of Silesia, Ścinawa was annexed by Prussia in 1742 and became part of the German Empire in 1871. The town obtained rail connections with Głogów and Wrocław in 1874, and Legnica and Rawicz in 1898.

During World War II the Germans established there forced labour camps for French and Soviet prisoners of war, and a forced labour subcamp of the Nazi juvenile prison in Wołów. The Germans turned the town into a defensive fortress by building about 60 shelters on its outskirts. Fiercely embattled between the Wehrmacht and the Red Army on 30–31 January 1945, it was captured by the latter, with some 75% of the buildings destroyed. The German population of Ścinawa was expelled in accordance to the Potsdam Conference. First Poles displaced from Soviet-annexed eastern Poland came to Ścinawa in May and June 1945.

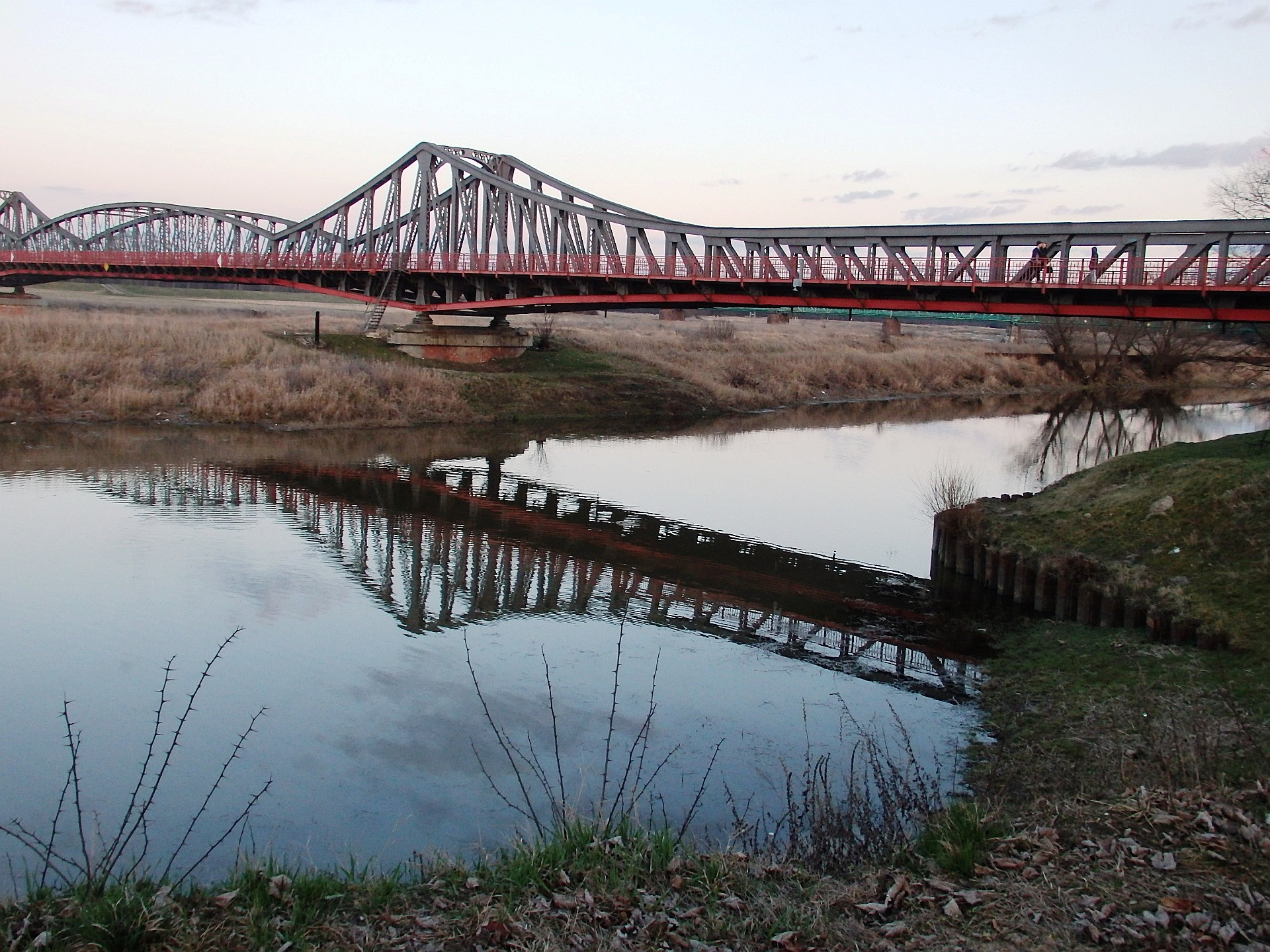
The Oder bridge

In 1947, a soap and washing powder factory was established, as well as a branch of a dairy cooperative in Lubin, which produced butter for the Polish market and casein exported to Switzerland, the Netherlands and Japan. The food industry was the most important in Ścinawa. A fruit and vegetable processing plant was established in 1958, which produced pickles, kompot, salads and honey, over 30% of which were exported. A new butchery and modernized bakery were built in 1962 and 1968, respectively. Between 1975 and 1998, Ścinawa was administratively located in Legnica Voivodeship.

The town was affected by the 2010 Central European flood. Ścinawa was partially flooded during the 2024 Central European floods.

== Sights ==
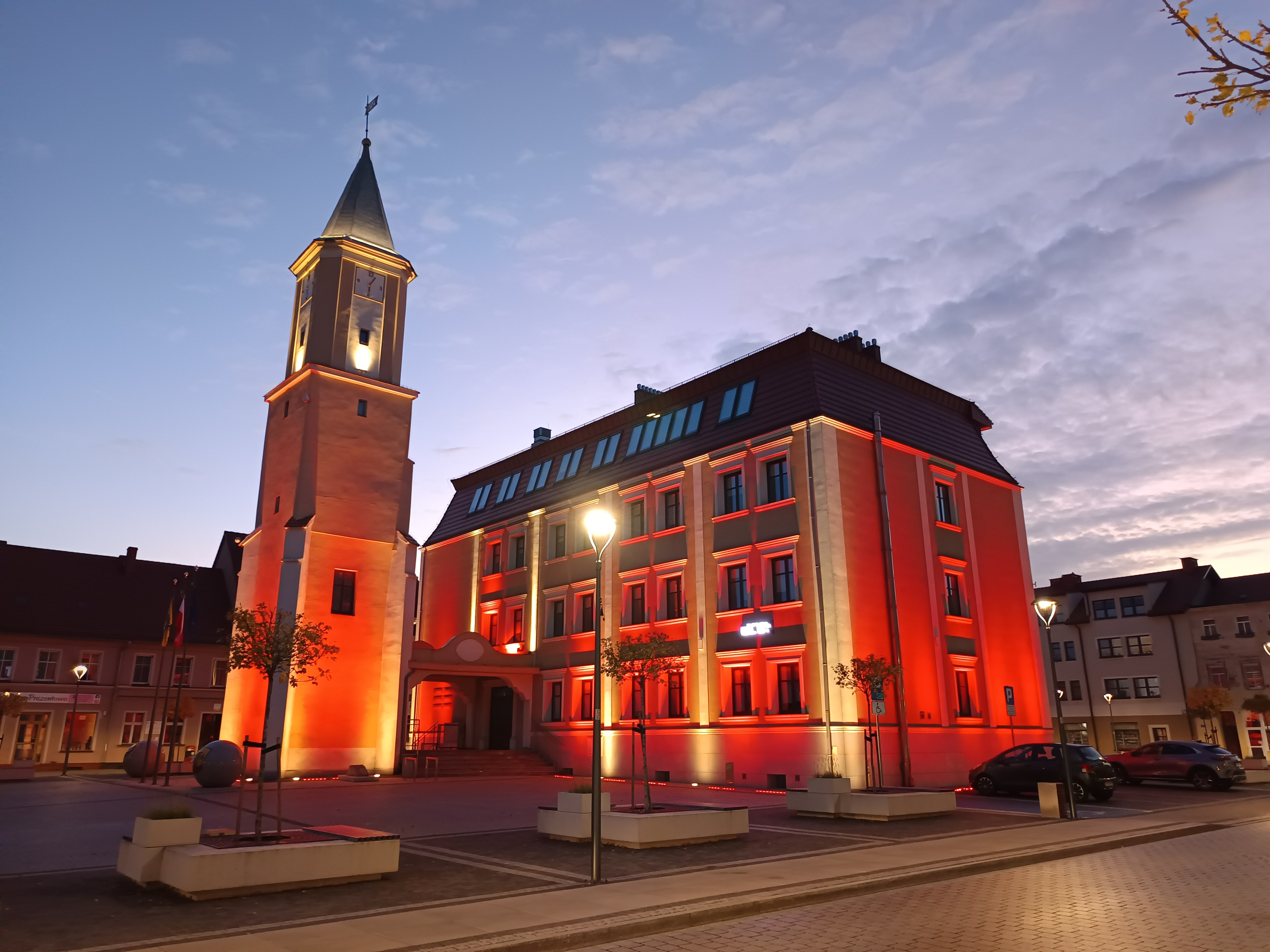
Town Hall

The town features a number of historic monuments including the Gothic church of the Exaltation of the Holy Cross, dating back to 1209, the town hall tower (19th century) and the partially preserved medieval city walls.

== Transport ==
National road 36 bypasses Ścinawa to the south. National road 36 connects Lubin to the west and to Rawicz to the east.

Vovoideship 292 also bypasses the town to the south and west.

Ścinawa has a station on the Zielona Góra-Wrocław railway line.

== Sports ==
The town's soccer team, Odra Ścinawa, was established in 1946. Ścinawa also has a karate club named "GOJU-RYU" which has been very successful in regional, national and international competitions. In addition, each year Ścinawa holds swimming championships at the local pool. There is also a fishing club and a chess club in Ścinawa. Apart from organized sports, locals enjoy playing soccer, volleyball and basketball.

Ryszard Komornicki, a former Poland player and a former manager of FC Aarau, was born in the town.

== Education ==
Ścinawa's educational institutions include an elementary school and a junior high school. The town is also home to a local day care.

== Alzheimer's Treatment Center ==
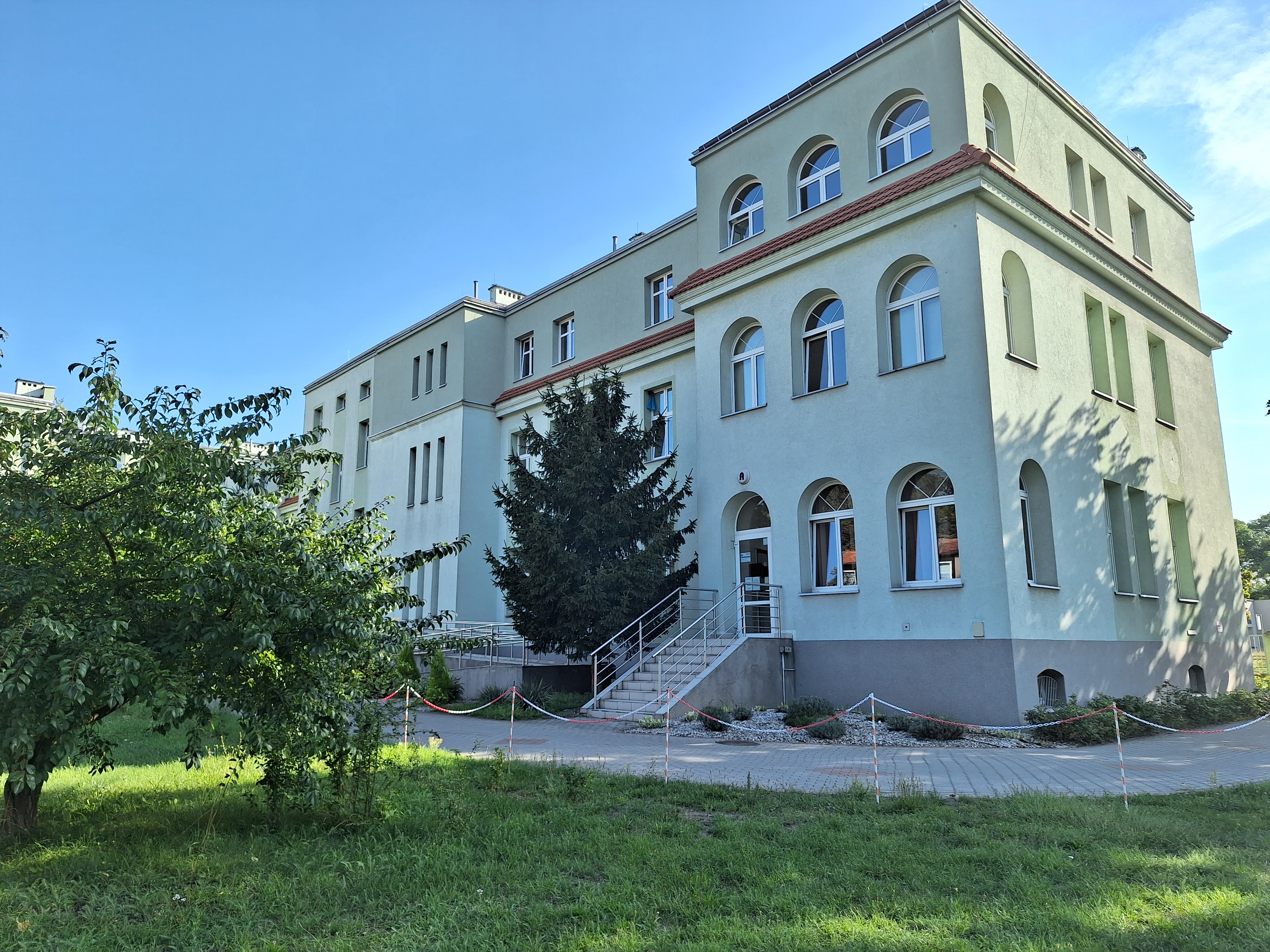
Alzheimer's Treatment Center

In 2007, the Wrocław Medical Academy established an Alzheimer's Treatment Center in Ścinawa. The facility is the first of its kind in Poland and only the second in all of Europe. The building, which cost over 3 million US dollars to remodel, once served as a general hospital as well as an orphanage.

== Twin towns – sister cities ==
See twin towns of Gmina Ścinawa.

== Bibliography ==
- Kowalak, Czesław; Moryń, Jerzy; Nir, Edward (1990). Ścinawa 1945–1989 (in Polish). Legnica: Wojewódzki Urząd Statystyczny w Legnicy.
