= Koźle =

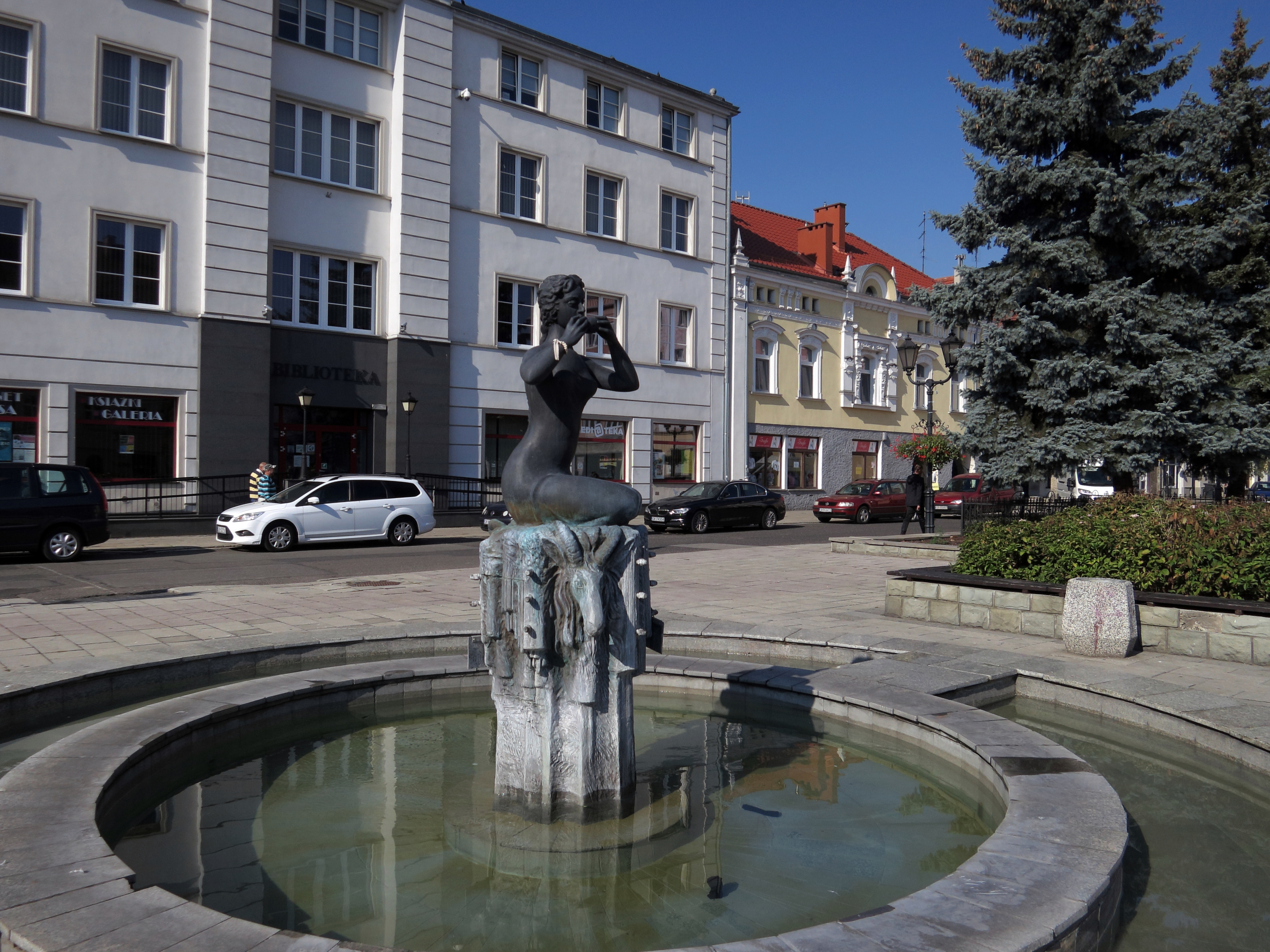
- Rynek (Market Square) in Koźle

- Coat of arms

- Location within Poland Location within Opole Voivodeship
- Coordinates: 50°20′7″N 18°8′45″E
- Country: Poland
- Voivodeship: Opole
- County: Kędzierzyn-Koźle
- Urban Gmina: Kędzierzyn-Koźle
- First mentioned: 12th century
- Town rights: 1281
- Merged into Kędzierzyn-Koźle: 1975
- Time zone: UTC+1 (CET)
  - Summer (DST): UTC+2 (CEST)
- Vehicle registration: OK

Koźle (German: Cosel) is a district of Kędzierzyn-Koźle, Poland, located in the western part of the city at the junction of the Kłodnica and Oder rivers, c. 50 km southeast of Opole. The district has a Roman Catholic church, a medieval chateau, remains of a 19th-century fortress and a high school. Koźle's industries include a shipyard and an inland port.

== History ==
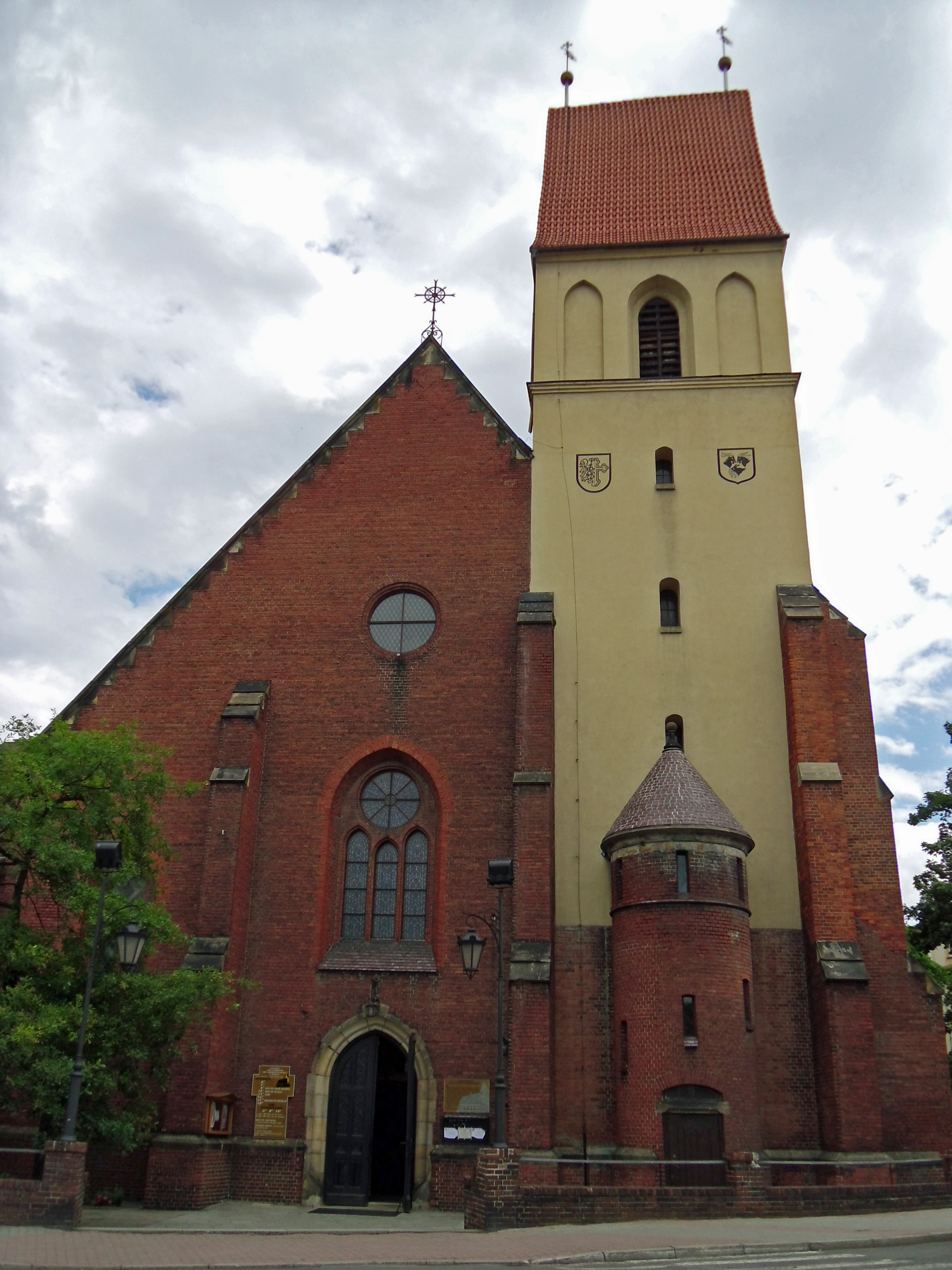
Saint Sigismund church

The settlement was first mentioned in the early 12th-century Gesta principum Polonorum, the oldest Polish chronicle. Its name comes from the Polish word kozioł, which means "goat". As a result of the fragmentation of Poland, from 1281 to 1355 Koźle was the seat of a splinter eponymous duchy ruled by a local branch of the Piast dynasty. Also in 1281, Koźle obtained town rights. After 1355, it remained under the rule of other branches of the Polish Piast dynasty until 1532, when it was absorbed to Bohemia. In 1431, Duke Konrad VII the White founded a Monastery of the Order of Friars Minor in Koźle. It was besieged several times during the Thirty Years War, and in 1645, it returned to Polish rule under the House of Vasa.

It fell to Prussia by the 1742 Treaty of Breslau. Frederick II converted it into a fortress which held against Austrian sieges in 1758, 1759, 1760 and 1762. In 1807 it almost withstood a siege by the Deroy brigade of the Bavarian Army, while Bavaria was allied with Napoleonic France. From 1871 it was part of the German Empire. The Polish Bank Ludowy and a local branch of the Polish Sokół movement were founded in the town in 1903 and 1904, respectively. Polish insurgents captured the part of the town east of the Oder during the 1921 Third Silesian Uprising, however, the town remained part of Germany in the interbellum. Local Polish activists were intensively persecuted by the Germans since 1937.

During World War II, the Germans operated three forced labour subcamps (E2, E153, E155) of the Stalag VIII-B/344 prisoner-of-war camp in the town. In total 176 slave-labor camps were known in Upper-Silesia with up to in total 120.000 slave laborers.

Between August and December 1942, 39 trains, headed for Auschwitz or Birkenau from Holland, Belgium and France, were halted at the Cosel (Kozle) freight station, about 80 kilometers before Auschwitz. This was part of the forced labor policy of the Dienststelle Schmelt, which organised the forced labor in that part of Upper Silesia, (named after SS Brigadeführer Albrecht Schmelt). Men and boys between the age of 15 until 50,mainly Jewish and fit for work, were taken from these trains. They were taken to Sankt-Annaberg, a transfer camp (durchgangslager) from where they were put to work in several slave-labor camps like Blechhammer, Kdo Bobrek or Heydebreck . In total 176 names of labor camps from the Schmelt-organisation are known. They were also forced to work at the construction of the highway (Reichs Autobahn) there as well as chemical factories (Oberschlesische Hydrierwerke AG) being built there.

In total a number of about 9600 men and boys were taken from these trains (around 5000 from France, 3400 from Holland and 1200 from Belgium). Hardly any survived the war (only 874 returned home after the war). For most of them their place of death is "Somewhere in Central Europe" in mainly anonymous mass graves. On April 1, 1944 the camps of "Aktion Schmelt", was taken over by the SS and the camps became sub-camps of Auschwitz. From many victims the date of death is put at March 31 1944 because they simply weren't there anymore to be registered.

In the final stages of the war, in 1945, a German-conducted death march of thousands of prisoners of several subcamps of the Auschwitz concentration camp passed through the town towards the Gross-Rosen concentration camp. With the bulk of Silesia, it was among territories regained by Poland after World War II. However, 6,000 bomb craters were recorded in the Koźle Basin ranging from 16 feet (4.9 m) to 49 feet (15 m) in diameter, as American and British bombers dropped a total of 39,137 bombs in the region starting from February 1943, which was used by the German government for industrial fuel production.

In the wake of Polish takeover of the region, many of the townspeople were expelled and some were arrested for speaking German.

== Notable residents ==
- Theodor von Scheve (1851–1922), chess master
- Moritz Hadda (1887–1942), Jewish-German architect
- Heinrich Tischler (1892–1938), German painter
- Irene Eisinger (1903–1994), singer
- Georg Wahl (1920–2013), equestrian
- Hanno von Graevenitz (1937–2007), German diplomat
- Ullrich Libor (1940–), German sportsman
- Mathias Fischer (1971–), sportsman
