= Přemek I of Opava =

Přemek I, Duke of Opava
- Přemek's seal
- Born: c. 1365
- Died: 28 September 1433
- Noble family: Přemyslid dynasty
- Spouses: Anna of Lutz; Catherine of Münsterberg; Helena of Bosnia
- Issue: Wenceslaus II; Nicholas IV; Agnes; William of Opava; Ernest of Opava; Jutta; Przemko II; Catherine; Hedwig
- Father: Nicholas II, Duke of Opava
- Mother: Jutta of Opole-Falkenberg

Přemek I, Duke of Opava' (or Przemko I) (Czech: Přemysl I. Opavský; German: Přemysl I. von Troppau; c. 1365 – 28 September 1433) was a member of the Opava branch of the Bohemian Přemyslid dynasty. He was Duke of Opava from 1367 until his death and Głubczyce from 1394 until his death.

== Life ==
His parents were Duke Nicholas II of Opava and his third wife, Jutta (died: c. 1365), daughter of Duke Boleslaw II of Opole-Falkenberg. Nicholas died shortly after Přemek was born, and so Přemek stood under the regency and guardianship of his oldest half-brother John, who was the sole heir of the Duchy of Racibórz.

After disputes over their inheritance, the four brothers decided in 1367 to divide the Duchy of Opava. In 1377, a new division was performed, in which John kept the Duchy of Racibórz, and also received the duchies of Krnov and Freudenthal. The Duchy of Głubczyce was split off for Nicholas III, with Přemek and Wenceslaus sharing the reduced Duchy of Opava. Wenceslaus died in 1381, and Přemek then ruled Opava alone. Before Nicholas III died in 1394, he had pledged Głubczyce, Zlaté Hory, Hlučín and Krzanowice to the Duchy of Oels. Přemek was later able to redeem Głubczyce.

Přemek also found himself in financial difficulties and had to pledge the Lordship of Hradec nad Moravicí to Wok Lacek of Krawarn. However, he managed to redeem this possession in 1394. In the same year, he found the Chapel of the Holy Cross in Kateřinky.

During a period of turmoil in Moravia, Přemek maintained close relations with Jobst of Moravia, whose mother was Přemek's half-sister. Because Přemek sided politically with King Wenceslaus, he joined the Silesian League at the meeting in Wrocław in 1402.

After Wenceslaus's death, Přemek supported King Sigismund and provided him with military support during the Hussite wars. The Hussites responded by destroying the Duchy of Opava in February 1428. Přemek's oldest son Wencelaus II managed to avert the destruction of Głubczyce by signing a treaty with the Hussites. In March 1428, Přemek joined forces with Duke Rupert II of Lubin and the Bishop of Wrocław. they fought the Hussites at Nysa, but could not prevail. Their army was overrun by the Hussites, however, Půta III of Častolovice could prevent the Hussites from taking Nysa itself. In December 1428, Přemek's son Wenceslaus participated in the Battle of Stary Wielisław, where the Hussites again prevailed. In March 1430, Přemek could prevent further destruction of the Duchy of Opava by concluding another treaty with the Hussites. The Hussites then destroyed Racibórz and Koźle instead. In 1431, a large part of the City of Opava was destroyed by fire.

Shortly before his death, Přemek wrote a will, stipulating that after his death, his eldest son Wenceslaus II should act as guardian and regent for his three younger sons from his second and third marriage. He also stipulated that they should not divided the duchy among themselves, however, in 1445, his sons divided the duchy anyway.

== Marriage and issue ==
Around 1395, Přemek married Anna of Lutz (d. 1405). They had three children:

- Wenceslaus II (d. 1446), Duke of Głubczyce, married around 1420 by Elizabeth of Kravař
- Nicholas IV (d. 1437), Duke of Opava and Lord of Zlaté Hory
- Agnes (died c. 1440), married firstly John of Kravař, and second George of Sternberg

After Anna's death, Přemek married to Catherine (died: 23 May 1422) of Münsterberg, a sister of John, who was the last Duke of Münsterberg from the Silesian Piasts dynasty. With her, he had three more children:

- William of Opava (d. 1452), Duke of Opava and Münsterberg
- Ernest of Opava (d, 1464), Duke of Opava and Münsterberg
- Jutta (d. 1445), married around 1435 Count George II of Bosing (d. 1467)

In 1425, Přemek married his third wife, Helena of Bosnia (d. 1435). She gave birth to the children:

- Przemko II (d. 1478), Canon in Wrocław
- Catherine (d. 1475), married John of Cimburg
- Hedwig (died c. 1500), abbess of the Sanctuary of St. Jadwiga in Trzebnica
