= Euphemia of Münsterberg =

German princess (c. 1385–1447)

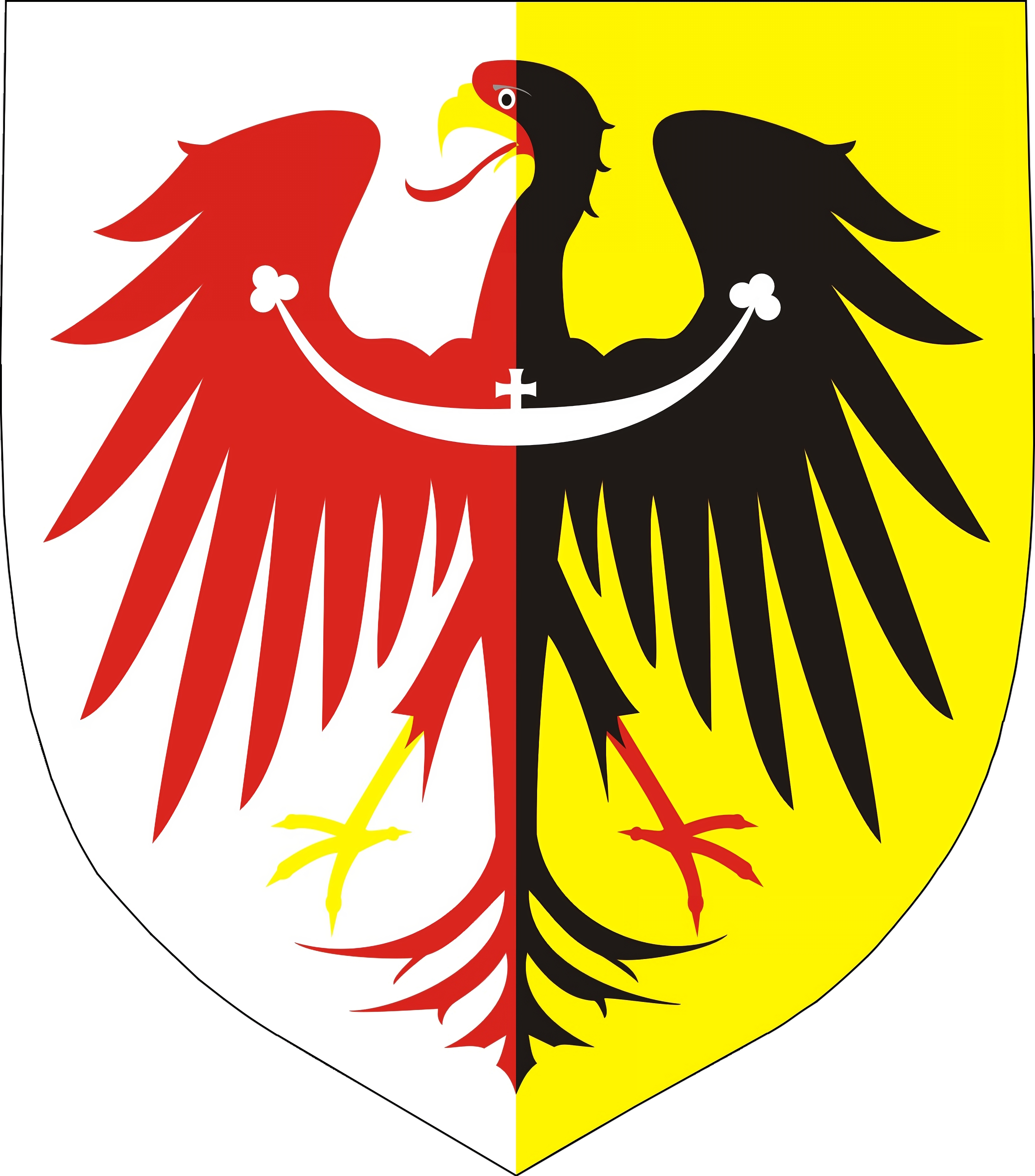
The Coat of Arms of The Piast dynasty, Muensterberg principality, Silesia.

Euphemia of Münsterberg (c. 1385 – 17 November 1447), also known as Euphemia, Countess of Oettingen, was a princess from the Münsterberg (Ziębice) branch of the Piast dynasty, by marriage Countess of Öttingen and sovereign Duchess of Münsterberg during 1435–1443.

She was the third child and eldest daughter of Duke Bolko III of Münsterberg and Euphemia, daughter of Duke Bolesław of Bytom.

== Life ==
In 1397 Euphemia married the widower Count Frederick III of Oettingen. They had nine children, five sons and four daughters. Perhaps under her influence, a German translation of the "Life of St. Hedwig of Andechs" with rich colors and illustrations was made, which remained in the Comital Library of Oettingen. After the death of her husband (23 January 1423), Euphemia returned to Münsterberg.

After the death of her brother John in 1428, the Duchy of Ziębice was incorporated into the Bohemian Kingdom and one year later (1429) granted to the magnate Půta III of Častolovice, Starost of Kłodzko. Shortly after, Euphemia loaned the Emperor Sigismund the sum of 4,000 guilders and bought with another 100 guilders the claims of Půta III's mother (Anna of Oświęcim) and eldest daughters (Anna and Katharina of Častolovice). On 11 November 1435, Euphemia was formally invested as Duchess of Ziębice.

Nicholas, Abbot of Heinrichau (Henryków), was strongly opposed to Euphemia's rule; it was suspected that he was a Hussite. In revenge, the Duchess ordered Sigismund of Rachenau, the castellan of Neuhaus (Chałupki) to plunder and burn the monastery of Heinrichau in 1438.

The disputes with Půta III's widow Anna of Koldice and her second husband Hynek Krušina of Lichtenburg continued during Euphemia's reign. Finally, a settlement was made in 1443: Münsterberg was given to Duke William of Opava, Euphemia's nephew (son of her late younger sister Katharina) and son-in-law of Půta III (husband of his younger daughter Salome).

After definitely losing the government of the Duchy, Euphemia returned to Germany. She died four years later.

Euphemia of Münsterberg House of Piast Born: c. 1385 Died: 17 November 1447
Preceded by Půta III of Častolovice	Duchess of Ziębice; 1435–1443	Succeeded by William
