= Puta =

Puta may refer to:

- Puta (deity), a minor Roman goddess of pruning
- Puta, Azerbaijan, a settlement in Azerbaijan
- Puta, 2021 album by Zahara
- Puta (Spanish profanity)

== People ==
- Emanuil Puta (1876–1963), Romaninan farmer and politician, member of the Great National Assembly of Alba Iulia
- Mircea Puta, Romanian mathematician
- Půta I of Častolovice, Bohemian nobleman
- Půta II of Častolovice (also Půta the Elder of Častolovice; died 1397), Bohemian nobleman
- Půta III of Častolovice (also Půta the Younger of Častolovice; died 1434), Bohemian nobleman, Landeshauptmann and pledge lord of the County of Kladsko and the Duchies of Ząbkowice Śląskie and Münsterberg
