= Hynek Krušina of Lichtenburg =

Hussite commander and governor

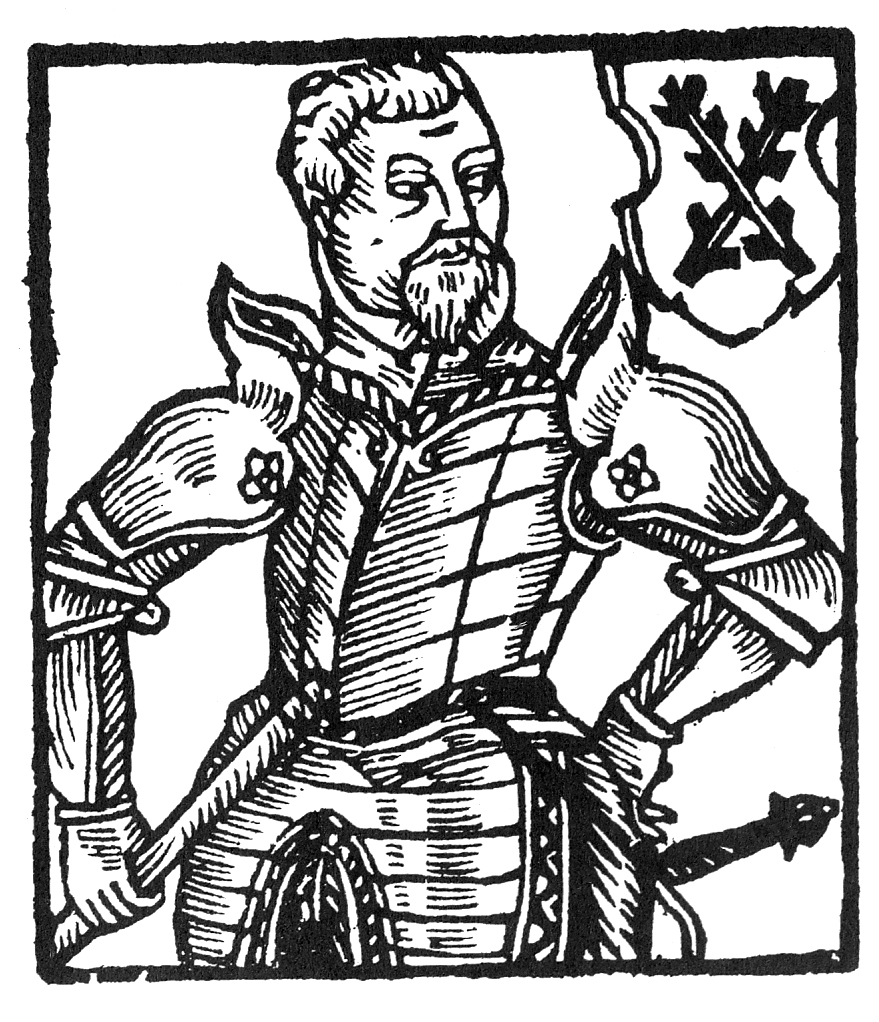
- Hynek Krušina IV. z Lichtenburka
- Born: 1392
- Died: 4 March 1454; Kladsko
- Buried: Augustinian monastery in Kladsko
- Noble family: Lichtenburg
- Spouses: Anna Zajíc of Hasenburg; Anna of Coldice
- Father: Jan Krušina of Lichtenburg
- Mother: Jitka

Hynek Krušina of Lichtenburg (also: Henry Kruschina of Lichtenburg, in Czech: Hynek Krušina IV. z Lichtenburka; 1392 – 4 March 1454, Kłodzko (Czech: Kladsko, German: Glatz)) was a knight, Hussite commander and governor and lien holders of the County of Kladsko, the Duchy of Münsterberg and the city of Ząbkowice Śląskie (German: Frankenstein).

== Origin, family and possessions ==
Hynek Krušina was a member of the Lichtenburg family, which in turn was a branch of the powerful Ronov dynasty. His father was John Krušina of Lichtenburg, who was a Royal Colonel and Chamberlain and Burgrave of the Duchy of Jawor.

After his father died, Hynek was influenced by Čeněk of Wartenberg. Čeněk probably persuaded Hynek to participate in the Bohemian Diet of 1415, where he protested against the condemnation of Jan Hus at the Council of Constance. Hynek and his brothers Alexander (who died c. 1422) and Jan inherited his possessions of Opočno, Kumburk Castle and Albrechtice. As Alexander and Jan were still minors, Hynek acted as their guardian and regent. However, Queen Sophie of Bavaria claimed Albrechtice as part of her jointure. Hynek would not accept the loss of Albrechtice and a military conflict broke out, which was decided in 1414 in favour of the Queen. Probably as a result of this conflict, Hynek found himself in financial difficulties and was forced to sell Opočno, which he had intended to give to Jan when the latter came of age. To compensate for this, he purchased the estate of Hostinné from Tristan of Redern.

In 1420 at Wrocław, Hynek and his brother Jan and other Bohemian nobles openly defied Emperor Sigismund. Shortly thereafter he was appointed captain of a Hussite army at the Battle of Vyšehrad. Later that year, at Mount Oreb in Třebechovice pod Orebem near Hradec Králové, he founded the Orebites, a federation of East Bohemian towns which was led by the priest Ambrož Hradecký and pursued egalitarian goals.

In 1425 or later Hynek married to Anna Zajíc of Hasenburg, a daughter of William Zajíc of Hasenburg, who was an outspoken opponent of the Hussites and sided with emperor Sigismund. Anna and Hynek had a son named William (born before 1430; died around 1487), whom they had named in honor of his maternal grandfather.

Hynek opposed the atrocities committed by the Taborites, but nevertheless participated in the Battle of Aussig in 1426. In 1428, he changed sides and submitted himself to the emperor. He then returned to his own estates.

Hynek's brother Jan was murdered in 1434, after a dispute with the city council of Broumov. After Jan's death, the estate of Hostinné fell back to Hynek. In 1437, King Sigismund gave him the Lordship of Miletín, which his father had already held from 1404 to 1407.

== Career ==
In February 1437 he attended the coronation of Emperor Sigismund's wife Barbara as Queen consort of Bohemia. After Sigismund died in December 1437, Hynek supported the candidacy of Sigismund's son-in-law Albert II. After Albert was elected as King of Bohemia, Hynek was allowed to bear the royal sword at the coronation ceremony on 29 June 1438 the St. Vitus Cathedral in Prague and took part as seneschal in the subsequent celebrations. In October 1438, Albert had to leave Prague to avert a Polish invasion in Silesia and afterwards travelled to Hungary to repel the Turks. He appointed a council to support governor Ulrich II, Count of Celje. Hynek was a member of this council, along with Meinhard of Neuhaus and Hanuš of Kolowrat.

In the late 1430s, Hynek tried to expand his possessions in eastern Bohemia. On 6 September 1440, he purchased the liens over the estate of Kladsko, the Duchy of Münsterberg, the city of Ząbkowice Śląskie and some East Bohemian possessions, from Anna of Koldice, the widow of Půta III of Častolovice. Her East Bohemian possessions included Nové Hrady, Rychmberk Castle, Potštejn, Albrechtice, Choceň, Hummel and Častolovice. Anna's mother-in-law, also named Anna (died in 1454 or earlier), the daughter of Jan II of Oświęcim and the widow of Půta II of Častolovice, still resided in Častolovice; Hynek conceded the usufruct of Častolovice to her for the rest of her life. He also took over Půta III's debt and undertook to raise Půta's three daughters, Anna, Catherine and Salome, befittingly.

The negotiations for the sale seem to have been accelerated by the kidnapping of Anna's eldest daughter (who was also called Anna). In the summer of 1440, she was taken by Sigismund of Reichenau from Kladsko Castle to Chałupki Castle, which he held as a fief of the bishop of Wrocław. Sigismund wanted to marry Anna (the daughter), in order to obtain part of her father's inheritance. Anna (the mother), instead sold her husband's possessions to Hynek and married him three weeks later, on 29 September 1440. She hoped that Hynek would be able to arrange the release of her daughter. Hynek began by negotiating with Konrad of Oels, the bishop of Wrocław. He demanded that Anna be released and Sigismund be punished. In order to put pressure on Konrad, Hynek began to loot the Duchy of Nysa. On 29 December 1440, Konrad promised to dispossess Sigismund, release Anna and transfer Chałupki Castle to Anna's relatives. However, Konrad hesitated to intervene. In early 1441, Hynek besieged Chałupki Castle and freed his stepdaughter. Sigismund and his accomplices managed to escape to another episcopal property, the nearby Kaltenštejn Castle. As Konrad had promised, Hynek could keep the castle. He installed his own vogt and some troops on the castle.

In July 1441, Emperor Sigismund's widow Barbara returned to Bohemia to take possession of her wittum. Hynek accompanied her on the route from Kladsko to Hradec Králové, where she was received by Hynek Ptáček of Pirkstein, and other Bohemian nobles. Hynek had approached Hynek Ptáček the year before, when the Utraquists met in Nymburk. In August 1441, Hynek joined the Landfrýd, a regional alliance of nobles and cities to keep the peace, at its meeting in Čáslav. At this meeting, he probably came into contact with the robber baron Jan Kolda of Žampach, who held Rychmberk Castle and the Lordship of Hummel illegally. These possessions were legally Hynek's, as he had purchased them from Anna of Koldice in 1440.

Discord remained between Hynek and Bishop Konrad, probably because of Hynek's utraquist sympathies and his Hussite past. Over the next few years, it led to military conflicts in which other Silesian princes were involved. Most of them rejected Hynek's claim on Duchy of Münsterberg, with the Estates of Münsterberg, headed by Captain Frederick Stosch playing a crucial role. In order to deter them and underline his claims on Münsterberg, Hynek sacked on 20 July 1442, the monastery at Henryków, to which the citizens of Münsterberg had a special relationship. When Hynek attacked again, aiming to conquer the Duchy, the citizens of Münsterberg were able to repel him.

On 25 April 1443, the citizens of Münsterberg elected Duke William of Opava (1410–1452) as their new sovereign. He was a member of the Přemyslid dynasty and his mother Catherine was a sister of Duke John I, who had been the last Duke of Münsterberg of the Piast line. Although William had married Hynek's stepdaughter Salome, the daughter of Anna of Koldice and the late Půta of Častolovice, a short time earlier, he became one of Hynek's opponents.

On 15 and 16 July 1443, Duke William of Opava and Münsterberg, Bishop Konrad of Wrocław and their allies besieged Chałupki Castle and took it. The city of Ząbkowice Śląskie, which at the time belonged to the Lordship of Kladsko, was also besieged. Karpień Castle, which Hynek has used as his base when he attacked the Diocese of Wrocław, was captured and destroyed.

The situation calmed down in the summer of 1444. By the end of 1444, the dispute between Hynek and William of Münsterberg, although he never gave up his claim on Münsterberg. Also in 1444, Hynek finally gained control over the Lordship of Hummel, which he had legally owned since 1440. Hummel Castle, however, remained a den of thieves. Soldiers holding he castle charged high tariffs from merchants and travellers who passed the castle on their way to Hummel Pass.

In 1446 in the parliament at Prague, Hynek signed a petition to the Pope, asking him to acknowledge the Compact of Prague and recognize Jan Rokycana as archbishop.

On 27 April 1452, Hynek attended the parliament at Prague where George of Poděbrady was elected as regent of Bohemia. It was intended that George would exercise this role until the newly elected King Ladislaus Postumus came of age. However, Ladislaus died in 1457 and in 1458, George was himself elected King of Bohemia. On 16 October 1452, Parliament adopted a motion, which was then brought to Vienna by a high-level delegation, which included Hynek.

== Legacy ==
Hynek spent his final years in Kladsko, and died there in 1454. In Kladsko, he was respected, because he had managed to keep the country out of the wars in the 1441 to 1445 time frame. He also enjoyed a reputation of religious tolerance. He was buried in the Augustinian monastery in Kladsko. He had been the monastery's benefactor and had always had good relationships with it. On 9 December 1455 Hynek's widow Anna endowed a benefice that hymns may be sung at Krušina's grave every Tuesday. In an obituary published by the monastery at Kamieniec Ząbkowicki, Hynek was described as a loyal patron (fidelis fautor monasterii).

A few weeks after Hynek's death, his son William — probably due to a preliminary contract concluded by Hynek — sold the possessions that had belonged to the Častolovice family, including the estate of Hummel, the lien of Kladsko and the city of Ząbkowice Śląskie to George of Poděbrady, who would later be elected King of Bohemia and who already owned the adjacent estate of Náchod. This allowed George to extend his family's possessions in Eastern Bohemia. In 1456, he purchased the Duchy of Münsterberg from Ernest of Opava, thereby increasing his influence in Silesia. In 1459, George raised the Lordship of Kladsko to a County, known in German as the County of Glatz.

William did not initially sell the estate of Hostinné and Kumburk, the original possessions of the Lichtenburg family. For reasons unknown, William later sold Hostinné to his stepmother, Anna of Coldice. He only retained the estate of Kumburk with Kumburk Castle, which his heirs retained until the end of the 15th century, and the estate of Miletín, which his heirs sold in 1522.

William Krušina's sons Jan, Hynek, Bernhard and Smil acquired Trutnov in 1527. Bernhard had two sons, also named Hynek and Jan. Jan died childless in 1539, leaving Hynek's son Jan Bernhard (who died in 1590), as the last member of the Krušina branch of the Lichtenburg family.
