= Przemko III of Opava =

Przemko III, Duke of Opava
- Born: c. 1450
- Died: 17 February 1493
- Buried: St. Othmar church in Mödling
- Noble family: Přemyslids
- Father: William, Duke of Opava
- Mother: Salome of Častolovice

Przemko III, Duke of Opava (also known as Přemek III or Primislaus III; Czech: Přemysl III. Opavský; German: Přemysl III. von Troppau; c. 1450 – 17 February 1493) was a member of the Opavian branch of the Bohemian Přemyslid dynasty. He was titular Duke of Opava and canon of Wrocław, Olomouc and Vienna, as well as Provost of the St. Othmar parish in Mödling. In the older literature Przemko III is often confused with his uncle Przemko II.

== Life ==
His parents were Duke William of Opava and Salome, a daughter of the Bohemian nobleman Půta III of Častolovice.

After his father's death in 1452, his brother Ernest took up the guardianship of Przemko and his four siblings. Przemko III and his brothers Frederick and Wenceslas III inherited a two thirds share of the Duchy of Opava; their cousin John II held the remaining third. Their father had held the Duchy of Münsterberg for a while, however, Przemko and his brothers did not inherit it, because their father had swapped it with Ernest for the latter's third of Opava. The brothers nevertheless sometimes used the title of "Duke of Münsterberg". Ernest, in his capacity as their guardian, sold the brothers' two-thirds of Opava in 1464 to Duke Bolko V of Opole. John II retained his share.

As Przemko III had no prospect of a steady income, his uncle destined him for a career in the clergy. In 1464, he enrolled at the Jagiellonian University in Kraków under the name Preclarus princeps Przyemislaus dux Oppawie d. T.. He became a member of the Cathedral chapter in Wrocław, together with his uncle Przemko II, Duke of Opava (dux junior and dux senior). The archives of Wrocław describe him as "Duke of Münsterberg" in 1466. He also became canon of Olomouc, probably around the same time.

During the winter semester of 1471, Przemko III studied at the University of Vienna, where he probably received his bachelor's degree. In 1479, he succeeded Paul Laubmann and Cathedral Dean in Vienna. In the certificate of his appointment, he is called Primislaus dux Oppaue. He also succeeded Paul Laubmann as provost of the St. Othmar parish in Mödling. He received this appointment from Emperor Frederick III, together with an apartment at the ducal court, where he lived for the rest of his life. His coat of arms can still be seen in this apartment. He appears to have taken his job as pastor very seriously. In the episcopal archive in Vienna, several documents from the years 1481-1484 describe his work. Although he had been financially ruined by the destruction in the Duchy of Opava, his university degree made him one of the more outstanding and accomplished Moravian and Silesian noblemen of his time.

Przemko II died unmarried and childless on 17 February 1493. He was buried in the St. Othmar church in Mödling. A red marble grave plate can still be found on the northern wall. It bears the inscription: Anno Domini 1493. 17. februarii obiit hic illustris princeps Primislaus Opavie dux. Wratislaviensi Olemucensis et Wiennensis. Ecclesiarum canonicus plebanus hic in Medling atque decanus Wienne Austrie, cuius anima vivat Deo. Amen.
