= Půta of Častolovice =

Půta of Častolovice may refer to:

- Půta I of Častolovice, Bohemian nobleman
- Půta II of Častolovice (also Půta the Elder of Častolovice; died 1397), Bohemian nobleman
- Půta III of Častolovice (also Půta the Younger of Častolovice; died 1434), Bohemian nobleman, Landeshauptmann and pledge lord of the County of Kladsko and the Duchies of Ząbkowice Śląskie and Münsterberg
