= Frederick, Duke of Opava =

- Born: c. 1440
- Died: 1470
- Noble family: Přemyslids
- Father: William, Duke of Opava
- Mother: Salome of Častolovice

Frederick, Duke of Opava (Czech: Bedřich Opavský; German: Friedrich von Troppau; c. 1440 – 1470) was a member of the Opava branch of the Bohemian Přemyslid dynasty. He was co-ruler of Opava from 1452 to 1456.

== Life ==
His parents were Duke William of Opava and his wife Salome (d. 1489), and daughter of the Bohemian nobleman Půta III of Častolovice.

After his father died in 1452, his uncle Ernest took up the guardianship of Frederick and his two brothers and two sisters. The three brothers (Frederick, Wenceslas III, and Przemko III) had jointly inherited two thirds of the Duchy of Opava. The remaining third was held by their cousin John II. Their father had held the Duchy of Münsterberg for a while, however, Frederick and his brothers did not inherit it, because their father had swapped it with Ernest for the latter's third of Opava. Ernest, in his capacity as their guardian, sold the brothers' two-thirds of Opava in 1464 to Duke Bolko V of Opole. John II retained his third.

Little is known about Frederick's life. His mother did not have sufficient income to maintain a proper ducal court. To help her, Duke Conrad X of Oels gave her the usufruct of Ścinawa in 1460. It is not known whether Frederick lived at Ścinawa, like his brother Wenceslas.

Frederick died unmarried and childless in 1470, aged around 30.
