= De Re Rustica =

De Re Rustica (Latin for "On Rural Affairs" or "On Agriculture") is a name shared by several treatises on agriculture.

It may refer to:

- De Re Rustica by Varro (1st century BC), also known as the Res Rusticae or Rerum Rusticarum
- De Re Rustica by Columella (1st century)
- De Re Rustica by Palladius (4th or 5th century), also known as the Opus Agriculturae
