= Albert of Koldice =

- Died: 1448
- Noble family: Kolditz
- Spouse: Anna of Saida
- Father: Thimo VII of Koldice
- Mother: Anna of Kittlitz

Albert of Koldice (also spelled Kolditz) (died 1448) was a Bohemian nobleman. He was governor of Upper Lusatia and of the Silesian duchies of Jawor and Wroclaw.

== Life ==
Albert was a member of the old Saxon noble Kolditz family. He was a son of Thimo VII of Koldice and his wife Anna of Kittlitz.

After the death of King Wenceslaus IV of Bohemia, he was governor of the hereditary Duchy of Jawor from 1419 until his death. From 1420 to 1424, he was also governor of the Duchy of Wroclaw; and from 1425 until his death, he was also governor of Upper Lusatia.

In his capacity as governor, he fought on the Catholic side in the Hussite wars. In 1428, he participated with his own army in the Battle of Wielisław, on the side of his son-in-law Půta III of Častolovice and Duke John I of Münsterberg. In 1433, in order to prevent Chojnik Castle from falling into Hussite hands, he handed the castle to the city of Jelenia Góra and demanded that the city commit to razing the castle and no rebuilding it.

He died in 1448, and was succeeded as governor of Upper Lusatia by his Hans of Koldice, the son of his elder brother Sigmund of Koldice.

== Marriage and issue ==
Albert married Anna of Saida. They had two children:

- Thimo IX (before 1425–1448)
- Anna (died 1 February 1467), married:
  1. in 1396 to Půta III of Častolovice (died 1434), with whom she had three daughters
  2. on 29 September 1440 to Hynek Krušina of Lichtenburg (1392–4 March 1454)
