= Wenceslaus II of Opava =

Wencelaus II, Duke of Opava
- Born: c. 1397
- Died: between 1445 and 1447
- Noble family: Přemyslids
- Spouse: Elisabeth of Kravař
- Issue: John I John II the Pious
- Father: Przemko I, Duke of Opava
- Mother: Anna of Lutz

Duke Wenceslaus II of Opava (also known as Wenceslaus of Głubczyce; Czech: Václav II. Opavský; c. 1397 – between 1445 and 1447) was a member of the Opavian branch of the Přemyslid dynasty. He was Duke of Opava from 1433 until his death. From 1435 until his death, he was also Duke of Głubczyce and Lord of Fulnek.

== Life ==
His parents were Duke Przemko I of Opava and his first wife, Anna of Lutz (d. 1405). Around 1420, Wenceslaus II married to Elisabeth of Kravař.

After his father's death in 1433, Wenceslaus II took up the guardianship of his younger half-brothers William, Ernest and Przemko II, while his younger brother Nicholas IV styled himself Lord of Zlaté Hory. Although their father had stipulated in his will that they should rule the duchy jointly, the brothers divided their inheritance around 1435. William and Ernest received shares of Opava; the Duchy of Głubczyce was split off for Wenceslas and a palace at Charles Square in Prague. The youngest brother, Przemko II, was destined for an ecclesiastical career and did not receive a share of the duchy. When Nicholas IV died in 1437, Wenclaus II inherited Zlaté Hory.

In late February 1428, during the Hussite Wars, Wenceslaus II managed to stave off the complete destruction of Głubczyce by concluding a treaty with the Hussites. On 27 December 1428, he participated in the Battle of Stary Wielisław, in which John I, the last Piast duke of Münsterberg, died. In 1436, Duke Nicholas V of Krnov occupied Głubczyce without giving any justification. Wenceclaus II then occupied the city of Żory in return. In 1437, a compromise was reached. Due to financial difficulties, Wenclaus had to mortgage Zlaté Hory and Edelštejn Castle to Duke Bolko V of Opole in 1440.

Wenceslaus II died between 1445 and 1447. His possessions were inherited by his sons John I and John II. John I died in 1454 and John II inherited his share. John II sold his share of Opava in 1464 to George of Poděbrady, who had already purchased the other shares in 1454 from Wenceslaus's half-brother Ernest.

== Marriage and issue ==
Wenceslaus II married Elisabeth of Kravař around 1420. They had three children:

- John I Hanuš (1420–1454)
- John II the Pious, Duke of Opava and Głubczyce (d. c. 1485), married with a Catherine of unknown parentage
- Anna (d. 1478; according to other sources, cited in cs:Václav II. Opavský, she died in 1505), married around 1460 with John Zajícové z Hazmburka (d. 1495), who had earlier been married to Catherine, a daughter of Půta III of Častolovice.
