= Henry II of Münsterberg =

Henry II
- Duke of Ziębice/Münsterberg
- Coat-of-arms of Ziębice.
- Born: c. 1396
- Died: 11 March 1420
- Noble family: Silesian Piasts
- Father: Bolko III of Ziębice
- Mother: Euphemia of Bytom

Henry II of Münsterberg (c. 1396 – 11 March 1420) was Duke of Münsterberg (Ziębice) since 1410 until his death (as co-ruler of his brother John I).

He was the third son of Duke Bolko III of Münsterberg by his wife Euphemia, daughter of Duke Bolesław of Bytom.

== Life ==
There is little known about his life. Henry II only appeared in the official documents with his older brother and main ruler John I. He died unmarried and childless and was probably buried in the Cistercian monastery of Heinrichau (Henryków). After his death, his brother John I ruled alone.

Henry II of Münsterberg House of Piast Born: c. 1396 Died: 11 March 1420
Preceded by Bolko III	Duke of Münsterberg; 1410–1420; With: John I	Succeeded by John I
