= Georgius Merula =

Italian scholar

Giorgio Merlani (c. 1430 – 1494), commonly known as Georgius Merula, was an Italian humanist and classical scholar.

== Life ==
Merlani was born in Alessandria in Piedmont between late 1430 and early 1431. He later took the Roman cognomen Merula, claiming descent from the ancients. The greater part of his life was spent in Venice and Milan, where he held a professorship and continued to teach until his death. While he was teaching at Venice, he was the subject of a personal polemic by Cornelio Vitelli, directed at his scholarship; and Vitelli replaced him in 1483.

== Works ==
Merula produced the editiones principes (first editions) of Plautus (1472), of the Scriptores rei rusticae, Cato, Varro, Columella, Palladius (1472) and possibly of Martial (1471). He also published commentaries on portions of Cicero (especially the De finibus), on Ausonius, Juvenal, Curtius Rufus, and other classical authors.

Merula wrote also Bellum scodrense (1474), an account of the siege of Shkodra (1474) (Scutari) by the Turks, and Antiquitates vicecomitum, The history of the Visconti, dukes of Milan, down to the death of Matteo the Great (1322). He violently attacked Politian (Poliziano), whose Miscellanea (a collection of notes on classical authors) were declared by Merula to be either plagiarized from his own writings or, when original, to be entirely incorrect.
