= Przemko II of Opava =

Przemko II, Duke of Opava
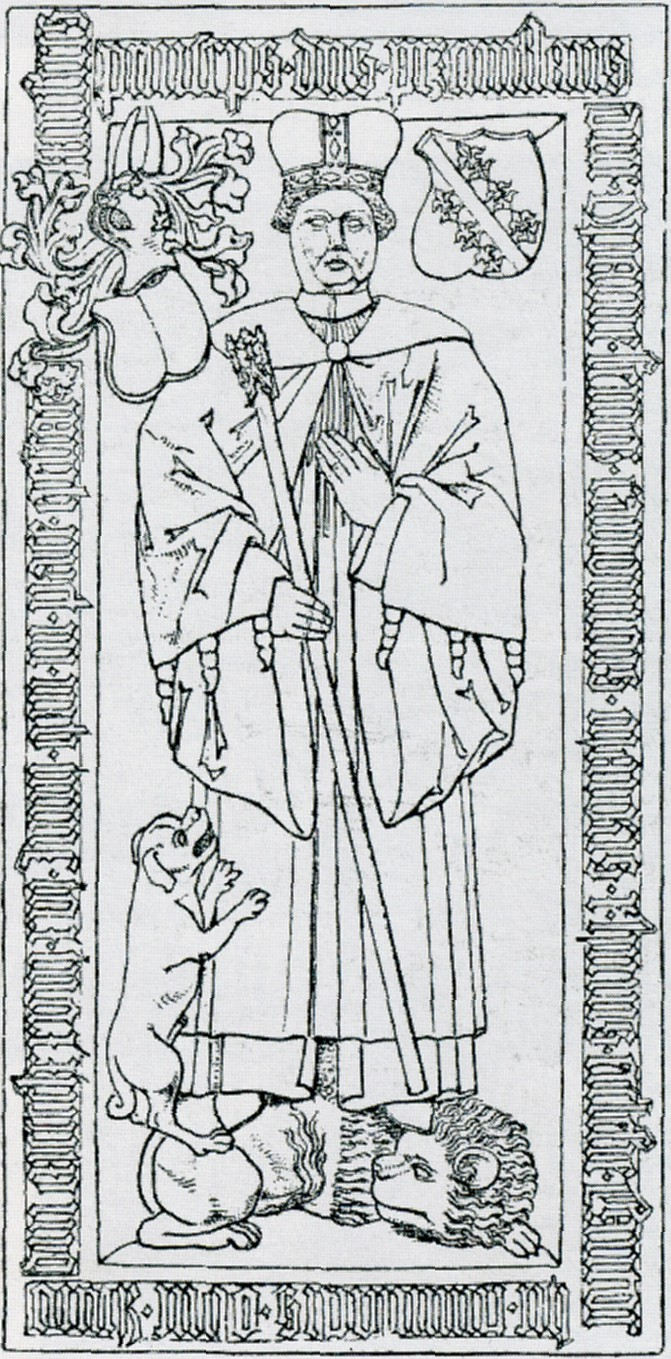
- Tomb of Przemko II
- Born: c. 1423-1425
- Died: June 16, 1478
- Buried: Church of the Holy Cross in Wrocław
- Noble family: Přemyslid dynasty
- Father: Przemko I, Duke of Opava
- Mother: Helena of Bosnia

Przemko II of Opava (Primislaus of Troppau, Czech: Přemysl II. Opavský, Polish: Przemek II Opawski; (c. 1423-1425 – 16 June 1478) was a member of the Opava branch of the Přemyslid dynasty. He was Duke of Opava from 1433 until his death. From 1466, he was also a member of the cathedral chapter of Wrocław. In older literature, he is sometimes confused with his nephew Przemko III.

== Life ==
Przemko II's parents were Duke Przemko I of Opava and his third wife, Helena of Bosnia (who died on 2 March 1435).

After Przemko I's death in 1433, his eldest son, Wenceslas II, took up the guardianship of his three younger half-brothers William, Ernest and Przemko II. His second-eldest, Nicholas IV, who had already reached adulthood, was given the Lordship of Zlaté Hory. Although their father had stipulated in his will that his territory should not be fragmented further, the brothers nevertheless divided their inheritance in 1435. At the time, Przemko II was destined for a career in the clergy, and he probably received no territory in the 1435 division.

Przemko II studied theology at the Universities of Krakow and Vienna. In Vienna, he wrote the astrological treatise Practice verissima domini ducis Przsenikonis data per dominum Petrum presbiterumde Oppavia Ludvico ad faciendam veram et perfectum lunam. Around 1455, he returned to Wrocław, where he had been a member of the cathedral chapter since 1446. In 1462, he was appointed provost of the Church of the Holy Cross in Wrocław.

In 1464 he got into a dispute with his nephew, John of Opava, about the ownership of Fulnek. In the same year, he had to give up his claim on a share of the Duchy of Opava, because King George of Bohemia had become the sole ruler of the Duchy. Przemko nevertheless continued to use the title Duke of Opava. Around 1465, he became a canon at Wrocław.

After Bishop Jošt of Wrocław died in 1467, Przemko served as diocesan administrator. Although he was considered a likely candidate to succeed Jošt, the post was given to Rudolf of Rüdesheim, who had previously served as papal legate for Germany and Bohemia.

Przemko was a renowned scientist, educated in the fields of theology, astrology and alchemy. He died in 1478, unmarried, and was buried in the Church of the Holy Cross in Wrocław. His tomb has been preserved to this day.
