= Tremellius =

Tremellius or Tremelius may refer to:

- Tremellius Scrofa, one of several ancient Romans
- Immanuel Tremellius, scholar of the sixteenth century
