= Bolko III of Ziębice =

Bolko III
- Duke of Ziębice/Münsterberg
- Coat-of-arms of Ziębice
- Born: c. 1348
- Died: 13 June 1410
- Noble family: Silesian Piasts
- Spouse: Euphemia of Bytom
- Issue: Nicholas; John I of Münsterberg; Euphemia of Ziębice; Katharina; Henry II of Ziębice; Agnes
- Father: Nicholas the Small
- Mother: Agnes Krušina of Lichtenberg

Bolko III of Ziębice or Bolko III of Münsterberg (c. 1348 – 13 June 1410) was a Duke of Ziębice (Münsterberg) from 1358 until his death, and ruler over Gleiwitz (Gliwice) during 1369–1373.

He was the eldest son of Nicholas the Small, Duke of Münsterberg, by his wife Agnes, daughter of Herman Krušina of Lichtenberg.

== Life ==
A minor at the time of his father's early death in 1358, Bolko III and his younger brother Henry I were placed under the regency of their mother, the Dowager Duchess Agnes. By 1360, Bolko III was able to rule by himself and take the guardianship of his brother, who in fact never participated actively in the government of the Duchy.

Bolko III followed the politics of both his father and grandfather, and sold most parts of his domains. In order to secure his marriage with the daughter of Duke Bolesław of Bytom, Euphemia, Bolko III was forced to pledge his main city of Münsterberg. However, thanks to this union, Bolko III could take possession over Gleiwitz in 1369; but four years later, in 1373, he sold the district to Konrad II the Gray, Duke of Oels (Oleśnica).

In 1379 Bolko III also sold the town of Kanth (Kąty Wrocławskie) to Konrad II the Gray, by the amount of 4,000 fines. Six years later, in 1385, he sold Strehlen (Strzelin) to Przemyslaus I Noszak, Duke of Cieszyn.

In 1368, after the death of Bolko II the Small without issue, Bolko III claimed his succession as the next male relative. However, without resources to pressed his claims, he finally renounced to all his pretensions on 28 January 1370 for a monetary compensation.

Bolko III was a faithful vassal of Emperor Charles IV, in whose court he spent some time. His contact with the House of Luxembourg permitted him to hold during 1396–1400 the post of Court Judge, under the reign of Charles IV's son, King Wenceslaus IV.

Bolko III died on 13 June 1410 and was buried in the Cistercian monastery of Heinrichau (Henryków).

== Marriage and issue ==
In 1369 Bolko III married with Euphemia (born c. 1350/52 – died 26 August 1411), daughter of Duke Bolesław of Bytom and widow of Duke Wenceslaus of Falkenberg. They had eight children:

1. Nicholas (born c. 1371 – died 9 November 1405)
2. John (born c. 1380 – killed in battle, Altwilmsdorf (Stary Wielisław), 27 August 1428)
3. Euphemia (born c. 1385 – died 17 November 1447), married in 1397 to Count Frederick III of Oettingen
4. Katharina (born c. 1390 – died 23 April 1422), married by 1410 to Duke Przemko I of Troppau (Opawa)
5. Henry II (born c. 1396 – died 11 March 1420)
6. Agnes (born c. 1400? – died bef. 25 April 1443)
7. Hedwig (d. young)
8. Elisabeth (d. young).

Bolko III of Ziębice House of Piast Born: c. 1348 Died: 13 June 1410
Preceded by Nicholas the Small	Duke of Ziębice with Henry I (until c. 1366); 1358–1410	Succeeded by Jan and Henry II
