= Nikola IV =

Nikola IV may refer to:

Several members of the House of Frankopan:

- Nikola IV Frankopan (1360–1432)
- Nikola IV Zrinski (1507–1566)

== See also ==
- Frankopan family tree
- Nicholas IV (disambiguation)
- Nikola (disambiguation)
