= Bolko III =

Bolko III may refer to:

- Bolko III of Strzelce (c.1337–1382)
- Bolko III of Münsterberg (c.1348–1410)
