= Jan II =

Jan II may refer to:

- Jan II of Oświęcim (c. 1344/51 – 1376)
- John II, Duke of Opava-Ratibor (after 1365 – 1424)
- Jan II the Mad (1435–1504)
- Jan II the Good (c. 1460 – 1532)
- Jan II Kazimierz Vasa (1609–1672), King of Poland
