= Půta I of Častolovice =

Czech nobleman

- Died: 1397
- Noble family: Častolovice

Půta I of Častolovice (also known as Půta the Elder or Půta the Eldest; first name sometimes spelled as Puota or Puotha, last name sometimes spelled as Častolowitz or Czastolowitz; Czech: Půta starší z Častolovic; d. 1397) was an east Bohemian nobleman. He was a member of the noble Častolovice family and held high office in Bohemia.

== Life ==
Půta was mentioned for the first time in 1342, when King John of Bohemia granted the village of Častolovice, which Půta owned, the status of a market town. In 1352, Emperor Charles IV appointed Půta to Burgrave of Potštejn. From 1350 to 1369, Půta held Liebenau castle in Czarny Bór in the Wałbrzych mountains.

From 1368 to 1377, he held various positions at the court in Prague. In 1377, he was appointed governor of Ząbkowice Śląskie. From 1366 to 1378, he was also governor of Kladsko. From 1372 to 1380, he administered Lower Lusatia and in 1377 a part of Brandenburg. Under Charles IV's successor Wenceslaus, Půta served as governor of Luxembourg from 1384 to 1386 and from 1395 until his death, he was governor of Lower Lusatia again.

In 1387, Půta and Boček II of Poděbrady purchased the Lordship of Skuhrov nad Bělou and Rychmberk Castle in the foothills of the Orlické Mountains from the brothers Jan and Jaroslav of České Meziříčí. In 1396, he transferred ownership of these possessions to his daughter-in-law; this suggests that he was the sole owner at that time.

== Marriage and descendants ==
Půta was married to Machna of unknown parentage and had with her a son of the same name, who was called during the life of his father "Půta the Younger", later, to distinguish from his own son, "Půta the Elder". Půta II of Častolovice married Anna, a daughter of Duke Jan II of Oświęcim. Their son, Půta III or Půta the Younger (d. 1434) was later Landeshauptmann and later pledge lord of the County of Kladsko and the Duchies of Ząbkowice Śląskie and Münsterberg.
