= Nicholas IV =

Nicholas IV can refer to:

- Patriarch Nicholas IV of Constantinople (1147–1151)
- Pope Nicholas IV (1288–1292)
- Patriarch Nicholas IV of Alexandria (1412–1417)
- Nicholas IV, Duke of Opava (c. 1400 – 1437)
