= William, Duke of Opava =

- Born: c. 1410
- Died: 15 August 1452
- Buried: Holy Spirit Church in Opava
- Noble family: Přemyslids
- Spouse: Salome of Častolovice
- Issue: Frederick; Wenceslas III; Przemko III; Catherine; Anna
- Father: Przemko I, Duke of Opava
- Mother: Catherine of Münsterberg

Duke William of Opava (Czech: Vilém Opavský; c. 1410 – 15 August 1452) was a member of Opava branch of the Bohemian Přemyslid dynasty. He was Duke of Opava from 1433 to 1452 and Duke of Münsterberg from 1443 to 1452.

== Life ==
His parents were Przemko I, Duke of Opava (d. 1433) and his second wife, Catherine of Münsterberg (d. 1422).

His father died in 1433, leaving five sons. The oldest brother, Wenceslaus II took up the guardianship for his younger half-brothers William, Ernest and Przemko II, while Wenceslaus's younger brother Nicholas IV styled himself Lord of Zlaté Hory. Although their father had stipulated in his will that they should rule the duchy jointly, the brothers divided their inheritance around 1435. William and Ernest received shares of Opava; the Duchy of Głubczyce was split off for Wenceslas. The youngest brother, Przemko II, was destined for an ecclesiastical career and did not receive a share of the duchy. The duchy was now so fragmented that the revenue did not cover the Duke's cost of living. William saw no option but to become a robber baron.

Hynek Krušina of Lichtenburg acquired the Duchy of Münsterberg in 1440. The Estates, however, rejected him as their sovereign. After length negotiations, they elected William of Opava as their new Duke. William's claim to Münsterberg was based on two relationships: his mother had been the sister of John I, the last Duke of Münsterberg from the Piast dynasty, and he was married to Salome, a daughter of Půta III of Častolovice, who had been the lawful pledge lord of Münsterberg until he died in 1434. William accepted his election and changed from a robber baron into a defender of the peace. Together with Dukes Nicholas V (d. 1452) of Krnov, Przemyslaus II of Cieszyn and Henry IX of Żagań-Głogów he fought as captain of Wrocław against highway robbers and robber barons.

In 1443, he formed an alliance with Archbishop Conrad of Wrocław and the Dukes of Wrocław, Jawor and Legnica against Hynek Krušina of Lichtenburg. Although Hynek had never given up his claims on Münsterberg, the dispute was resolved in 1444 and the Duchy of Münsterberg was granted to William, except the district of Ząbkowice Śląskie. The citizens of that district had fought on Hynek's side during the conflict and Hynek was allowed to retain the district.

In 1451, William transferred his ownership of Münsterberg to his brother Ernest, in exchange for a 1/3 share in the ownership of the Duchy of Opava. Since William had received another 1/3 share when his father's inheritance had been divided in 1435, he now owned 2/3 of Opava.

William died in 1452. His brother Ernest took up the guardianship of William's children. As their guardian, he sold William's 2/3 share of Opava to Duke Bolko V of Opole, in or after 1454. On 8 March 1456, Ernest sold the Duchy of Münsterberg to George of Poděbrady, who would be elected King of Bohemia in 1458. George purchased the 1/3 share of Opava after Bolko's death from the latter's brother Nicholas I and in 1464, he purchased the other 2/3 in Opole in 1464 from John II, thereby considerable increasing his political and economic influence in Silesia.

William of Troppau died in 1452. He was buried in the Holy Spirit Church in Opava.

== Family ==
William was married with Salome, a daughter of the East Bohemian nobleman Půta III of Častolovice and his wife, Anna, the daughter of Albert of Koldice. They had the following children:

- Frederick (d. 1470)
- Wenceslas III (d. 1474)
- Przemko III (d. 1493)
- Catherine (1443–1505), married to John II, Duke of Żagań
- Anna (d. 1515), abbess of the Sanctuary of St. Jadwiga in Trzebnica
