= Agriculture in ancient Rome =

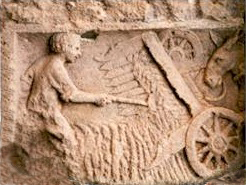
Relief depicting a Gallo-Roman harvester

Roman agriculture describes the farming practices of ancient Rome, during a period of over 1000 years. From humble beginnings, the Roman Republic (509 BC–27 BC) and the Roman Empire (27 BC–476 AD) expanded to rule much of Europe, northern Africa, and the Middle East and thus comprised many agricultural environments of which the Mediterranean climate of dry, hot summers and cool, rainy winters was the most common. Within the Mediterranean area, a triad of crops were most important: grains, olives, and grapes.

The great majority of the people ruled by Rome were engaged in agriculture. From the beginning of small, largely self-sufficient landowners, rural society became dominated by latifundium, large estates owned by the wealthy and using mostly slave labor. The growth in the urban population, especially of the city of Rome, required the development of commercial markets and long-distance trade in agricultural products, especially grain, to supply the people in the cities with food.

== Background ==
The main texts of the Greco-Roman agricultural tradition are mostly from the Roman agronomists: Cato the Elder's De agri cultura, Columella's De re rustica, Marcus Terentius Varro and Palladius. Attributed to Mago the Carthaginian, the agricultural treatise Rusticatio, originally written in Punic and later translated into Greek and Latin, is now lost. Scholars speculate whether this text may have been an early source for agricultural traditions in the Near East and Classical world.

== The "delightful" life ==
Agriculture in ancient Rome was not only a necessity but was idealized as a way of life. Cicero considered farming the best of all Roman occupations. In his treatise On Duties, he declared that "of all the occupations by which gain is secured, none is better than agriculture, none more profitable, none more delightful, none more becoming to a free man." When one of his clients was derided in court for preferring a rural lifestyle, Cicero defended country life as "the teacher of economy, of industry, and of justice" (parsimonia, diligentia, iustitia). Cato, Columella, Varro and Palladius wrote handbooks on farming practice.

In his treatise De agricultura ("On Farming", 2nd century BC), Cato wrote that the best farms contained a vineyard, followed by an irrigated garden, willow plantation, olive orchard, meadow, grain land, forest trees, vineyard trained on trees, and lastly acorn woodlands. Though Rome relied on resources from its many provinces acquired through conquest and warfare, wealthy Romans developed the land in Italy to produce a variety of crops. "The people living in the city of Rome constituted a huge market for the purchase of food produced on Italian farms."

Land ownership was a dominant factor in distinguishing the aristocracy from the common person, and the more land a Roman owned, the more important he would be in the city. Soldiers were often rewarded with land from the commander they served. Though farms depended on slave labor, free men and citizens were hired at farms to oversee the slaves and ensure that the farms ran smoothly.

== Crops ==
=== Grains ===
Staple crops in early Rome were millet, and emmer and spelt which are species of wheat. According to the Roman scholar Varro, common wheat and durum wheat were introduced to Italy as crops about 450 BC. Durum (hard) wheat became the preferred grain of urban Romans, because it could be baked into leavened bread and was easier to grow in the Mediterranean region than common (soft) wheat. Grains, especially baked into bread, were the staple of the Roman diet, providing 70 to 80 percent of the calories in an average diet. Barley was also grown extensively, dominating grain production in Greece and on poorer soils where it was more productive than wheat. Wheat was the preferred grain, but barley was widely eaten and also important as animal feed.

In De re rustica Columella wrote that emmer was more resistant to moisture than wheat. According to Columella four types of emmer were cultivated, including one variety that he calls Clusian (named for the town Clusium). Cato wrote that if sowing grain in humid or dewy soils was unavoidable, they should be sown alongside turnips, panic grass, millet and rapeseed.

Despite listing panicum and millet among the legumes Columella says they should be considered grain crops "for in many countries the peasants subsist on food made from them".

=== Legumes ===
Of legumes, Columella lists some that are preferred for cultivation: lentils, peas, lupinus, beans, cowpeas, and chickpeas (also listing sesame, panicum, cannabis, barley, and millet as legumes).

He writes the following about lupinus:

...it requires the least labor, costs least, and of all crops that are sown is most beneficial to the land. For it affords an excellent fertilizer for worn out vineyards and ploughlands; it flourishes even in exhausted soil; and it endures age when laid away in the granary. When softened by boiling it is good fodder for cattle during the winter; in the case of humans, too, it serves to warn off famine if years of crop failures come upon them.

=== Olives ===
The Romans grew olive trees in poor, rocky soils, and often in areas with sparse precipitation. The tree is sensitive to freezing temperatures and intolerant of the colder weather of northern Europe and high, cooler elevations. The olive was grown mostly near the Mediterranean Sea. The consumption of olive oil provided about 12 percent of the calories and about 80 percent of necessary fats in the diet of the average Roman.

=== Grapes ===
Viticulture was probably brought to southern Italy and Sicily by Greek colonists, but the Phoenicians of Carthage in northern Africa gave the Romans much of their knowledge of growing grapes and making wine. By 160 BC, the cultivation of grapes on large estates using slave labor was common in Italy and wine was becoming a universal drink in the Roman empire. To protect their wine industry, the Romans attempted to prohibit the cultivation of grapes outside Italy, but by the 1st century AD, provinces such as Spain and Gaul (modern-day France) were exporting wine to Italy.

=== Fodder ===
Columella mentions turnips as important, high-yielding food crop, especially in Gaul where they were used as winter fodder for cattle. As other "fodder crops" he lists Medic clover, vetch, barley, cytisus, oats, chickpea and fenugreek. Of Medic clover, he says it improves the soil, fattens lean cattle and is a high-yielding fodder crop.

Cato the Elder wrote that leaves from poplar, elm and oak trees should be gathered in the Fall before they have dried completely and stored for use as fodder. Turnips, lupines and forage crops were to be sown after the rainy season.

=== Other crops ===
The Romans also grew artichoke, mustard, coriander, rocket, chives, leeks, celery, basil, parsnip, mint, rue, thyme "from overseas," beets, poppy, dill, asparagus, radish, cucumber, gourd, fennel, capers, onions, saffron, parsley, marjoram, cabbage, lettuce, cumin, garlic, figs, "Armenian apricots," plums, mulberries, peaches, and hemp.

== Storage ==
Columella describes how produce is stored and gives advice to prevent spoilage. Liquids produced for market like oil and wine were stored on the ground floor and grain was stored in lofts with hay and other fodder. He instructs that granaries be well ventilated, cool, with minimal humidity, to prolong freshness. He describes certain methods of construction to avoid buildings developing cracks that would give animals and weevils access to the grains.

Press rooms, he advised, should be warm receiving light from the south to prevent the oil from freezing, which makes oil spoil faster.

== Land ==
Columella describes land as being classified into three types of terrain which he calls champaign (sloping plains), hills with a gradual but gentle rise, and wooded, verdant mountain highlands. Of soil, he says there are six qualities: fat or lean, loose or compact, moist or dry. The permutations of these qualities producing many varieties of soils. Columella quotes Vergil's comment that loose soil is "what we rival when we plough". Of the most preferred types of soil he says the best is fat and loose soil that is the least costly and most productive, then fat and dense which is productive though requiring more effort, and after these are the moist soils.

=== Religious practices and agricultural deities ===
Agricultural success in ancient Rome was closely linked with religious observance. The Romans worshipped a pantheon of agricultural deities, including Ceres, the goddess of grain and fertility, and Saturn, the god of sowing and time. Festivals such as the Cerialia were held in honor of Ceres, and the Saturnalia celebrated agricultural bounty and social inversion. These events were marked by sacrifices, games, and communal feasting, symbolizing the Romans’ belief in divine favor as essential to successful farming. According to Arnobius, Puta is the goddess who presided over pruning.

=== Tools and techniques ===
Roman farmers used a variety of tools, including the ard (a simple plough), sickles, and hoes. These tools were typically made of wood with iron tips. Innovations such as crop rotation and the use of organic fertilizers (manure and compost) were employed to maintain soil health. In dry regions, farmers constructed irrigation ditches and cisterns to manage water resources efficiently.

=== Agricultural economy and trade ===
The Roman economy was largely agrarian, with wheat, barley, olives, and grapes being staple crops. Grain was especially crucial, with major supply centers in Sicily, Egypt, and North Africa. Olive oil and wine became major export goods, transported via Rome’s extensive road and maritime trade networks. These products were traded across the empire, facilitating both economic and cultural exchange.

=== Slavery and agricultural labor ===
Slave labor was integral to Roman agriculture, especially on latifundia, large estates owned by the elite. These estates relied on enslaved people for planting, harvesting, and processing crops. The use of forced labor enabled vast agricultural output but also contributed to increasing economic inequality and social unrest.

=== Agricultural writings ===
Roman agricultural knowledge was preserved in detailed treatises, notably Cato the Elder’s De Agri Cultura, which provided practical advice on estate management and farming techniques. Later authors such as Varro and Columella expanded on these themes, discussing livestock, viticulture, and land use. Their writings reflect not only technical expertise but also the cultural and economic significance of agriculture in Roman society.

== Farming practices ==
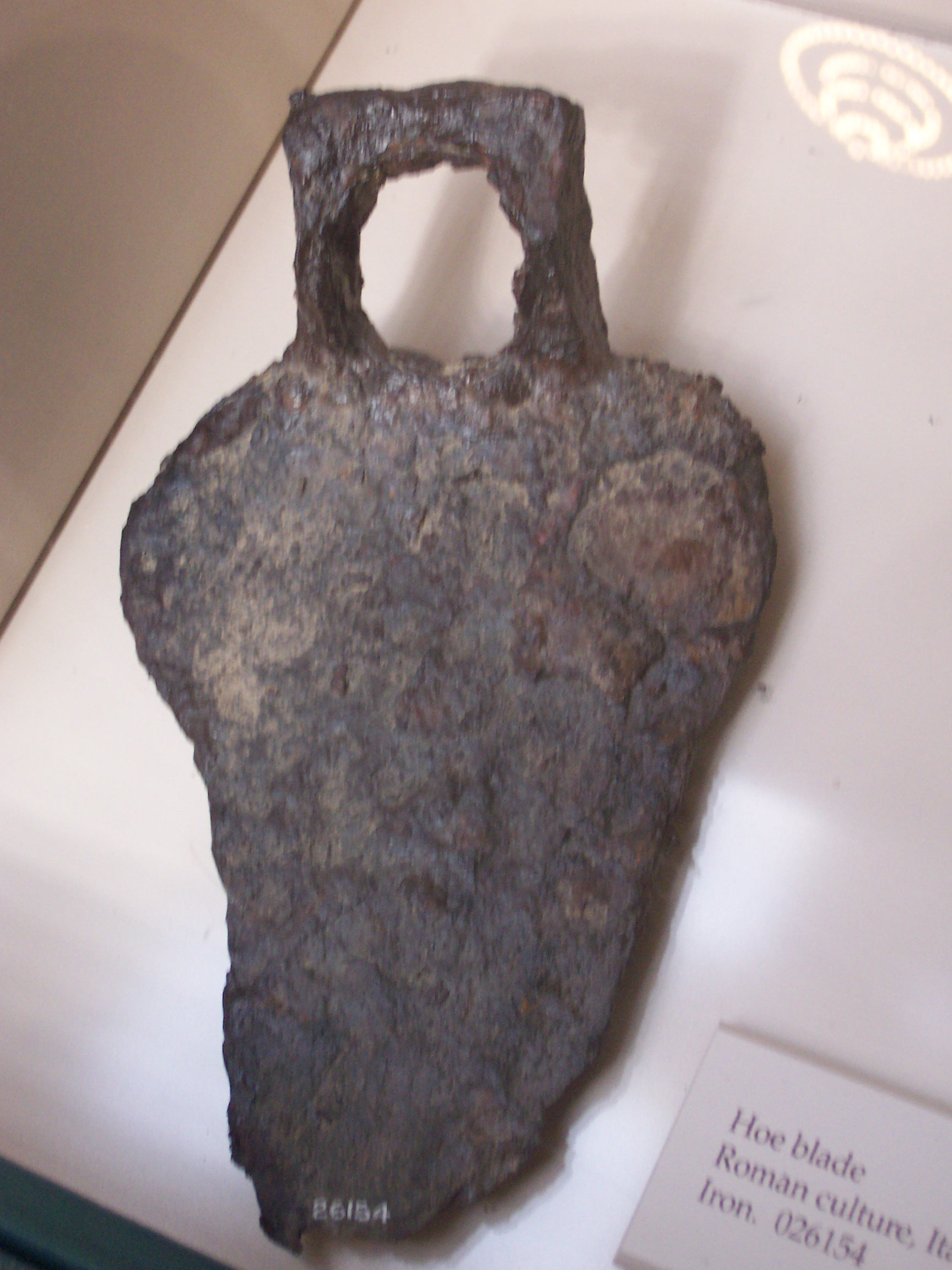
Roman hoe blade, from the Field Museum in Chicago

In the 5th century BC, farms in Rome were small and family owned. The Greeks of this period, however, had started using crop rotation and had large estates. Rome's contact with Carthage, Greece, and the Hellenistic East in the 3rd and 2nd centuries improved Rome's agricultural methods. Roman agriculture reached its height in productivity and efficiency during the late Republic and early Empire.

Farm sizes in Rome can be divided into three categories. Small farms were from 18 to 108 iugera. (One iugerum was equal to about 0.65 acres or a quarter of a hectare). Medium-sized farms were from 80 to 500 iugera. Large estates (called latifundia) were over 500 iugera.

In the late Republican era, the number of latifundia increased. Wealthy Romans bought land from peasant farmers who could no longer make a living. Starting in 200 BC, the Punic Wars called peasant farmers away to fight for longer periods of time. This is now disputed; some scholars now believe that large-scale agriculture did not dominate Italian agriculture until the 1st century BC.

Cows provided milk while oxen and mules did the heavy work on the farm. Sheep and goats were cheese producers and were prized for their hides. Horses were not widely used in farming but were raised by the rich for racing or war. Sugar production centered on beekeeping, and some Romans raised snails or rats as luxury food.

The Romans had four systems of farm management: direct work by owner and his family; tenant farming or sharecropping in which the owner and a tenant divide up a farm's produce; forced labour by slaves owned by aristocrats and supervised by slave managers; and other arrangements in which a farm was leased to a tenant.

Cato the Elder (also known as "Cato the Censor") was a politician and statesman in the mid- to late Roman Republic and described his view of a farm of 100 iugera in the De agri cultura. He claimed such a farm should have "a foreman, a foreman's wife, ten laborers, one ox driver, one donkey driver, one man in charge of the willow grove, one swineherd, in all sixteen persons; two oxen, two donkeys for wagon work, one donkey for the mill work." He also said that such a farm should have "three presses fully equipped, storage jars in which five vintages amounting to eight hundred cullei can be stored, twenty storage jars for wine-press refuse, twenty for grain, separate coverings for the jars, six fiber-covered half amphorae, four fiber-covered amphorae, two funnels, three basketwork strainers, [and] three strainers to dip up the flower, ten jars for [handling] the wine juice..." Cato's description is not indicative of the majority of farms in the early 2nd century BC. De agri cultura is a political document designed to show off Cato's character as much as it is a practical guide.

== Trade ==
There was much commerce between the provinces of the empire, and all regions of the empire were largely economically interdependent. Some provinces specialized in the production of grains including wheat, emmer, spelt, barley, and millet; others in wine and others in olive oil, depending on the soil type. Columella writes in his De re rustica, "Soil that is heavy, chalky, and wet is not unsuited to the growing for winter wheat and spelt. Barley tolerates no place except one that is loose and dry."

Pliny the Elder wrote extensively about agriculture in his Naturalis Historia from books XII to XIX, including chapter XVIII, The Natural History of Grain.

Greek geographer Strabo considered the Po Valley (northern Italy) to be the most important economically because "all cereals do well, but the yield from millet is exceptional, because the soil is so well watered." The province of Etruria had heavy soil good for wheat. Volcanic soil in Campania made it well-suited for wine production. In addition to knowledge of different soil categories, the Romans also took interest in what type of manure was best for the soil. The best was poultry manure, and cow manure one of the worst. Sheep and goat manure were also good. Donkey manure was best for immediate use, while horse manure wasn't good for grain crops, but according to Marcus Terentius Varro, it was very good for meadows because "it promotes a heavy growth of grass plants like grass."

== Economics ==
In the grain-growing area of north Africa, centered on the ancient city of Carthage, a family of six people needed to cultivate 12 iugera/ 3 hectares of land to meet minimum food requirements (without animals). If a family owned animals to help cultivate land, then 20 iugera was needed. More land would be required to meet subsistence levels if the family farmed as sharecroppers. In Africa Proconsularis in the 2nd century AD, one-third of the total crop went to the landowner as rent (See Lex Manciana).

Such figures detail only the subsistence level. It is clear that large scale surplus production was undertaken in some provinces, such as to supply the cities, especially Rome, with grain, a process known as the Cura Annonae. Egypt, northern Africa, and Sicily were the principal sources of grain to feed the population of Rome, estimated at one million people at its peak.

For yields of wheat, the number varies depending on the ancient source. Varro mentions 10:1 seed-yield ratio for wheat as normal for wealthy landowners. In some areas of Etruria, yield may have been as high as 15:1. Cicero indicates In Verrem a yield of 8:1 as normal, and 10:1 in exceptionally good harvest. Paul Erdkamp mentions in his book The Grain Market in the Roman Empire, that Columella was probably biased when he mentions a much lower yield of 4:1. According to Erdkamp, Columella wanted to make the point that "grain offers little profit compared to wine. His argument induces him to exaggerate the profitability of vineyards and at the same time to diminish the yields that were obtained in grain cultivation. At best Columella provides a trustworthy figure for poor soils; at worst, his estimate is not reliable at all."

Average wheat yields per year in the 3rd decade of the 20th century, sowing 135 kg/ha of seed, were around 1,200 kg/ha in Italy and Sicily, 1,710 kg/ha in Egypt, 269 kg/ha in Cyrenaica, Tunisia at 400 kg/ha, and Algeria at 540 kg/ha, Greece at 620 kg/ha. This makes the Mediterranean very difficult to average overall.

An agricultural unit was known as a latus fundus mentioned by Varro as a great estate, which can be interpreted as a latifundia or at 500 iugera or around 125 hectares because this is the land limit imposed by Tiberius Sempronius Gracchus as tribune in 133 BC.

With the incorporation of Egypt into the Roman empire and the rule of the emperor Augustus (27 BC–14 AD), Egypt became the main source of supply of grain for Rome. By the 70s AD, the historian Josephus was claiming that Africa fed Rome for eight months of the year and Egypt only four. Although that statement may ignore grain from Sicily, and overestimate the importance of Africa, there is little doubt among historians that Africa and Egypt were the most important sources of grain for Rome. To help assure that the grain supply would be adequate for Rome, in the second century BC, Gracchus settled 6,000 colonists near Carthage, giving them about 25 hectares (62 acres) each to grow grain.

Grain made into bread was, by far, the most important element in the Roman diet. Several scholars have attempted to compute the total amount of grain needed to supply the city of Rome. Rickman estimated that Rome needed 40 million modii (200,000 tonnes) of grain per year to feed its population. Erdkamp estimated that the amount needed would be at least 150,000 tonnes, calculating that each resident of the city consumed 200 kilograms (440 lb) of grain per year. The total population of Rome assumed in calculating these estimates was between 750,000 and one million people. David Mattingly and Gregory Aldrete estimated the amount of imported grain at 237,000 tonnes for 1 million inhabitants; This amount of grain would provide 2,326 calories daily per person not including other foods such as meats, seafood, fruit, legumes, vegetable and dairy. In the Historia Augusta, it is stated Severus left 27 million modii in storage – considered to be a figure for the canon at the end of the 4th century and enough for 800,000 inhabitants at 500 lbs of bread per person per annum

Pliny the Younger painted a picture that Rome was able to survive without Egyptian wheat in his speech the Panegyricus in 100 AD. In 99 there was an Egyptian crisis due to inadequate flooding.

Pliny the Younger stated that for "long it was generally believed that Rome could only be fed and maintained with Egyptian aid". However, he argued that "Now [that] we have returned the Nile its riches... her business is not to allow us food but to pay a proper tribute.

== Mechanization ==
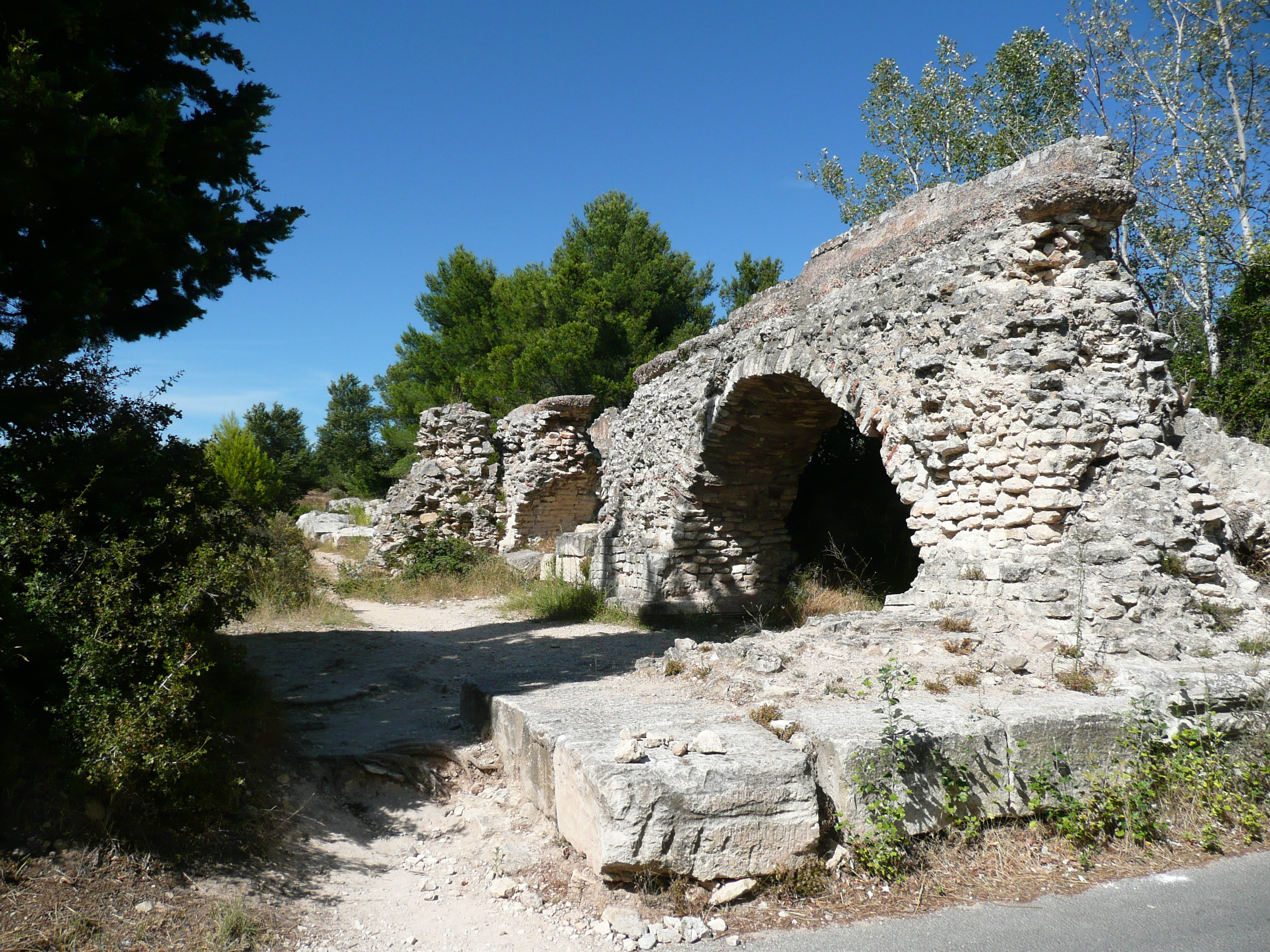
Arles aqueduct at the Barbegal mills

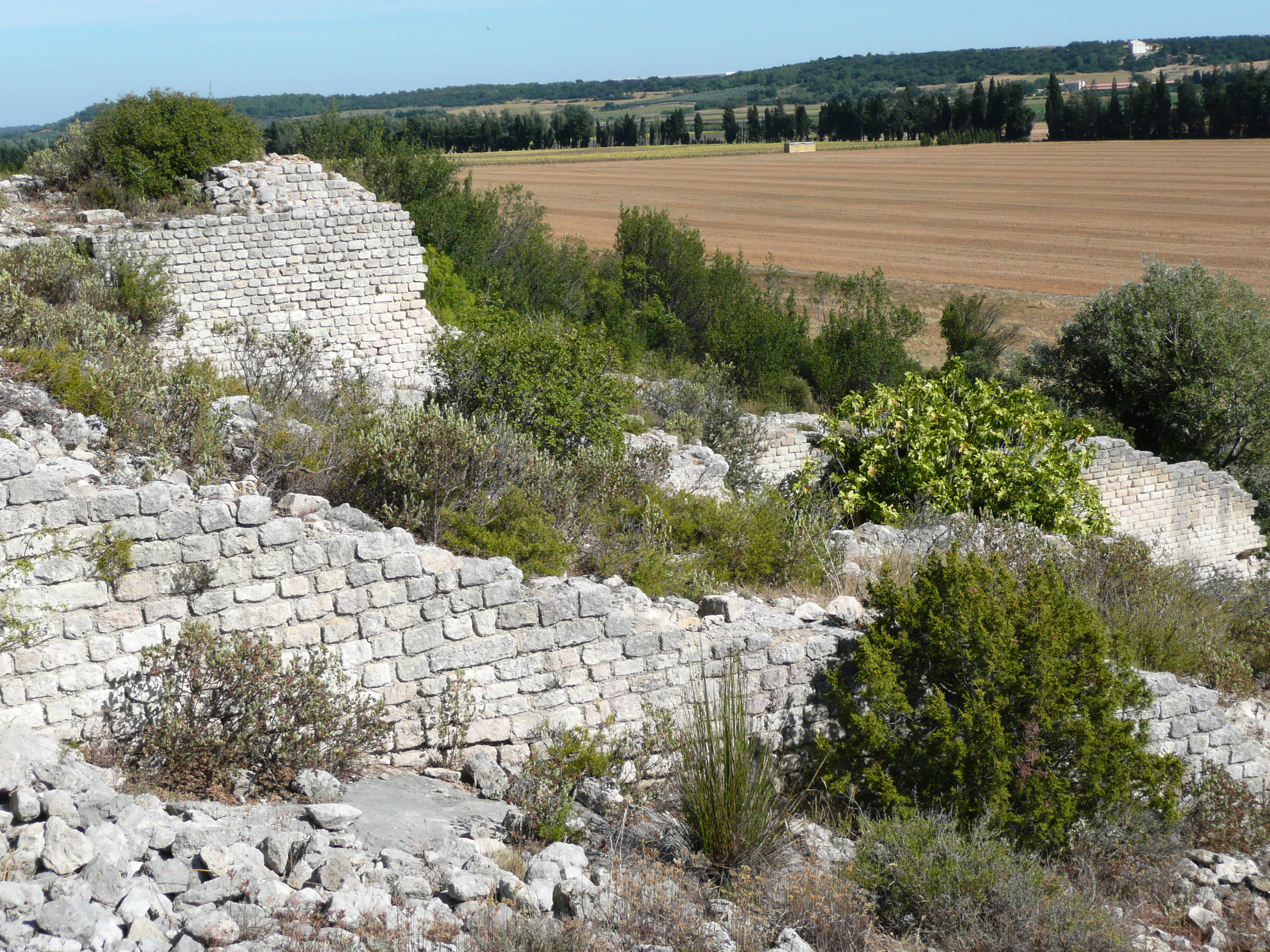
Part-reconstructed mills below rock-cut channel, Barbegal

The Romans improved crop growing by irrigating plants using aqueducts to transport water. Mechanical devices aided agriculture and the production of food. Extensive sets of mills existed in Gaul and Rome at an early date to grind wheat into flour. The most impressive extant remains occur at Barbegal in southern France, near Arles. Sixteen overshot water wheels arranged in two columns were fed by the main aqueduct to Arles, the outflow from one being the supply to the next one down in the series. The mills apparently operated from the end of the 1st century AD until about the end of the 3rd century. The capacity of the mills has been estimated at 4.5 tons of flour per day, sufficient to supply enough bread for the 12,500 inhabitants occupying the town of Arelate at that time.

Vertical water wheels were well known to the Romans, described by Vitruvius in his De architectura of 25 BC, and mentioned by Pliny the Elder in his Naturalis Historia of AD 77. There are also later references to floating water-driven grain mills in Rome and Byzantium and to water-driven sawmills on the river Moselle by the poet Ausonius. Multiple stacked sequences of reverse overshot water-wheels were used to provide motive power in many Roman mines.

There is evidence from bas-reliefs that farmers in northern Gaul (present day France) used a kind of automatic harvester or reaper when collecting ripe grain crops. The machine, called the "vallus" or "gallic vallus", was apparently invented and used by the Treveri people. It cut the ears of grain without the straw and was pushed by oxen or horses. Pliny the Elder mentions the device in the Naturalis Historia XVIII, 296. Possibly because the vallus was cumbersome and expensive, its adoption never became widespread and it fell into disuse after the 4th century AD. Scythes and sickles were the usual tools for harvesting crops.

== Acquiring a farm ==
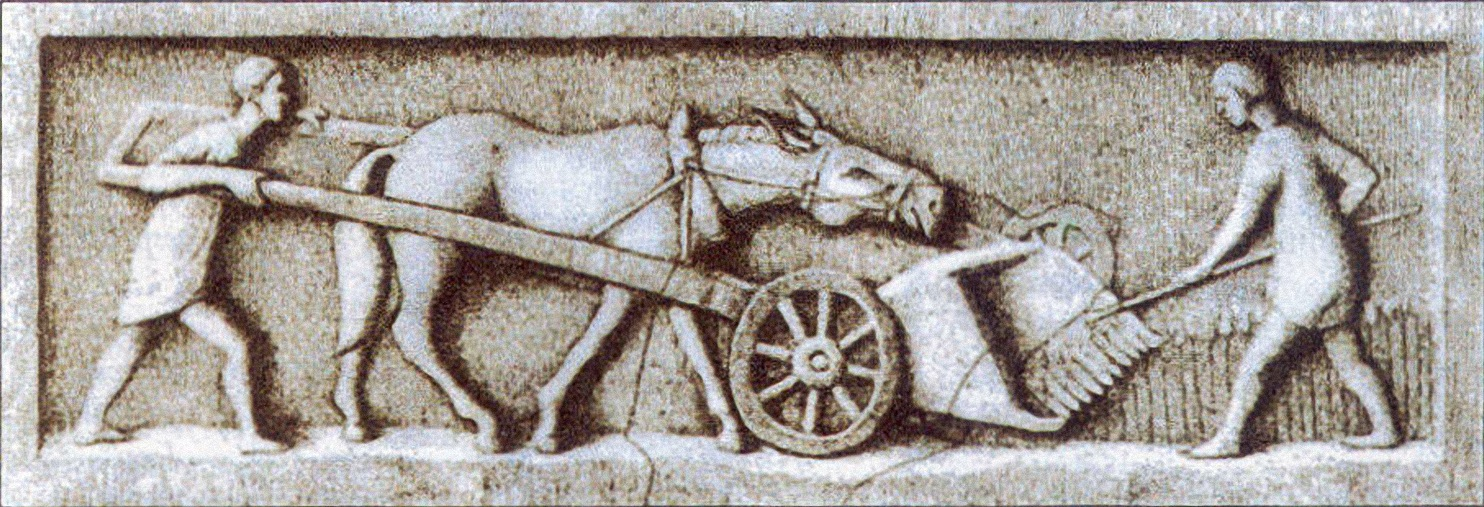
Gallo-Roman harvesting machine

Aristocrats and common people could acquire land for a farm in one of three ways. The most common way to gain land was to purchase the land. Though some lower-class citizens did own small pieces of land, they often found it too difficult and expensive to maintain. Because of the many difficulties of owning land, they would sell it to someone in the aristocracy who had the financial backing to support a farm. Though there were some public lands available to the common person for use, aristocrats also tended to purchase those pieces of land, which caused a great deal of tension between the two classes. “Mass eviction of the poor by the rich underlay the political tensions and civil wars of the last century of the Roman Republic.” Another way to acquire land was as a reward for going to war. High-ranking soldiers returning from war would often be given small pieces of public land or land in provinces as a way of paying them for their services. The last way to obtain land was through inheritance. A father could leave his land to his family, usually to his son, in the event of his death. Wills were drawn out that specified who would receive the land as a way of ensuring that other citizens did not try to take the land from the family of the deceased.

== Problems for farmers ==
Roman farmers faced many of the problems which have historically affected farmers, including the unpredictability of weather, rainfall, and pests. Farmers also had to be wary of purchasing land too far away from a city or port because of war and land conflicts. As Rome was a vast empire that conquered many lands, it created enemies with individuals whose land had been taken. They would often lose their farms to the invaders who would take over and try to run the farms themselves. Though Roman soldiers would often come to the aid of the farmers and try to regain the land, these fights often resulted in damaged or destroyed property. Landowners also faced problems with slave rebellions at times. "In addition to invasions by Carthaginians and Celtic tribes, slave rebellions and civil wars which were repeatedly fought on Italian soil all contributed to the destruction of traditional agricultural holdings.

== See also ==
- Ancient Egyptian agriculture
- Agriculture in ancient Greece
- Byzantine agriculture
- History of agriculture
- Deforestation during the Roman period
- Grain supply to the city of Rome
