= John I of Opava =

John I, Duke of Opava
- Born: c. 1420
- Died: 1454
- Noble family: Přemyslids
- Father: Wenceslaus II, Duke of Opava
- Mother: Elisabeth of Kravař

John I of Opava (also known as John of Fulnek, Czech: Hanuš z Fulneka, Hanuš Hlubčický, German: Johann I. von Troppau-Leobschütz; c. 1420 – 1454) was a member of the Opava branch of the Bohemian Přemyslid dynasty. He was co-ruler of Opava and Głubczyce from his father's death (between 1445 and 1447) and his own death. He was also Lord of Fulnek.

== Life ==
His parents were Duke Wenceslaus II of Opava and Głubczyce and Elisabeth of Kravař.

After his father's death (between 1445 and 1447) John I and his younger brother John II "the Pious" jointly inherited the Duchy of Głubczyce and one third of the Duchy of Opava.

John I died unmarried and childless in 1454. His brother inherited his possessions.
