= Lucius Junius Moderatus Columella =

1st century AD Roman writer on agriculture

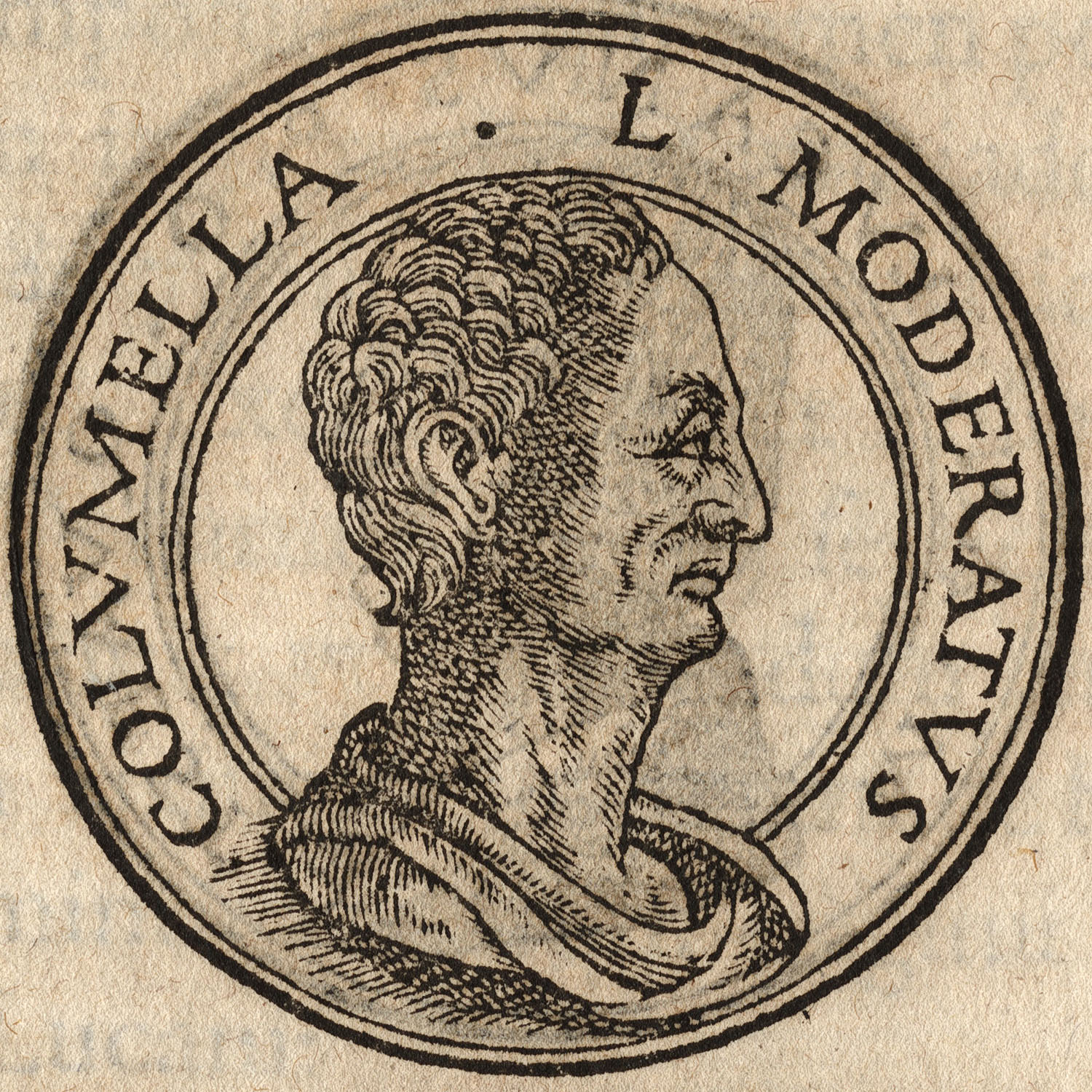
- Portrait of Lucius Junius Moderatus Columella by Jean de Tournes (Insignium aliquot virorum icones, Lyon, 1559)
- Born: 4 AD; Gades, Hispania Baetica
- Died: c. 70 AD
- Citizenship: Roman
- Writing career
- Notable work: De re rustica

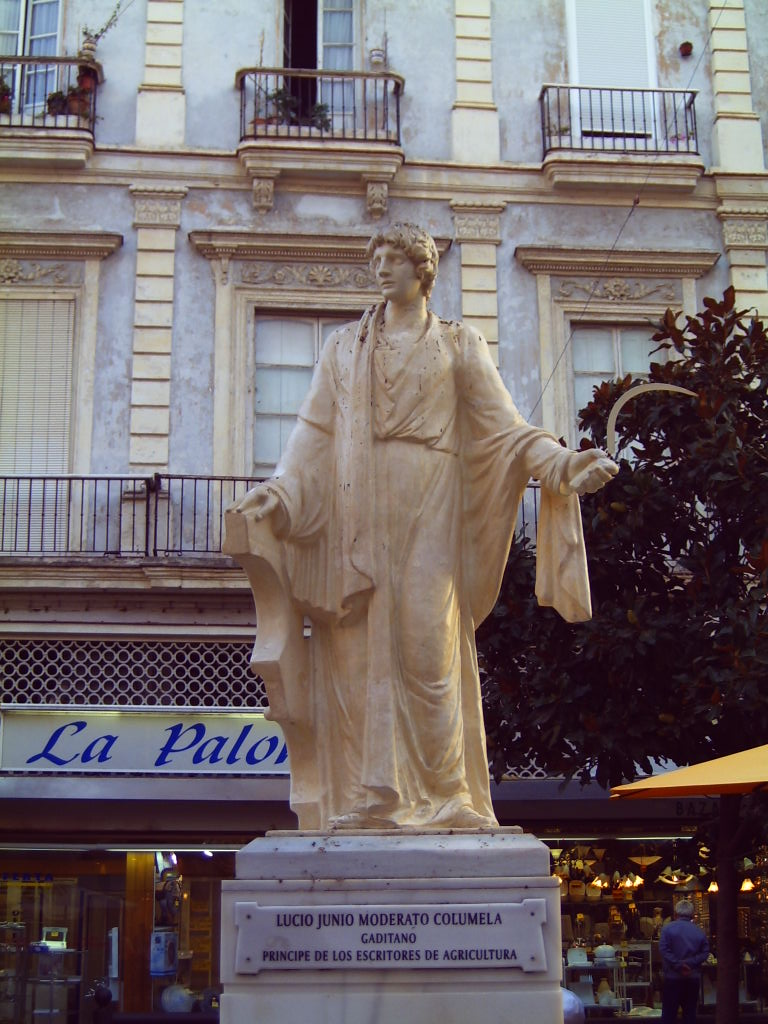
Statue of Columella, holding a sickle and an ox-yoke, in the Plaza de las Flores, Cádiz

Lucius Junius Moderatus Columella (/ˌkɒljəˈmɛlə/) was a Roman writer on agriculture in the Roman Empire.

His De re rustica in twelve volumes has been completely preserved and forms an important source on Roman agriculture and cuisine, together with the works of Cato the Elder and Marcus Terentius Varro, both of which he occasionally cites. A smaller book on trees, De arboribus, is usually attributed to him.

In 1794 the Spanish botanists José Antonio Pavón Jiménez and Hipólito Ruiz López named a genus of Peruvian asterid Columellia in his honour.

== Life ==
Little is known of Columella's life. He was probably born in Gades, Hispania Baetica (modern Cádiz). After a career in the army (he was tribune in Syria in 35 AD), he turned to farming his estates at Ardea, Carseoli, and Alba in Latium.

== Works ==
=== De re rustica ===
In ancient times, Columella's work "appears to have been but little read", cited only by Pliny the Elder, Servius, Cassiodorus, and Isidorus, and having fallen "into almost complete neglect" after Palladius published an abridgement of it.

This book is presented as advice to a certain Publius Silvinus. Previously known only in fragments, the complete book was among those discovered in monastery libraries in Switzerland and France by Poggio Bracciolini and his assistant Bartolomeo di Montepulciano during the Council of Constance, between 1414 and 1418.

Structure of De re rustica ("On Agriculture"):

- soils
- viticulture
- fruits
- olive trees
- big animals: cattle, horses and mules
- small animals: asses, sheep, goats, pigs, dogs
- fish and fowl: chickens, doves, thrushes, peacocks, Numidian chicken and guineafowl, geese, ducks, fish ponds
- wild animals: enclosures for wild animals, beekeeping, production of honey and wax
- gardens
- personnel management
- calendars
- household management

Book 10 is written entirely in dactylic hexameter verse, in imitation of, or homage to, Virgil. It may initially have been intended to be the concluding volume, books 11 and 12 being perhaps an addition to the original scheme.

A complete, but anonymous, translation into English was published by Andrew Millar in 1745. Excerpts had previously been translated by Richard Bradley.

=== De arboribus ===
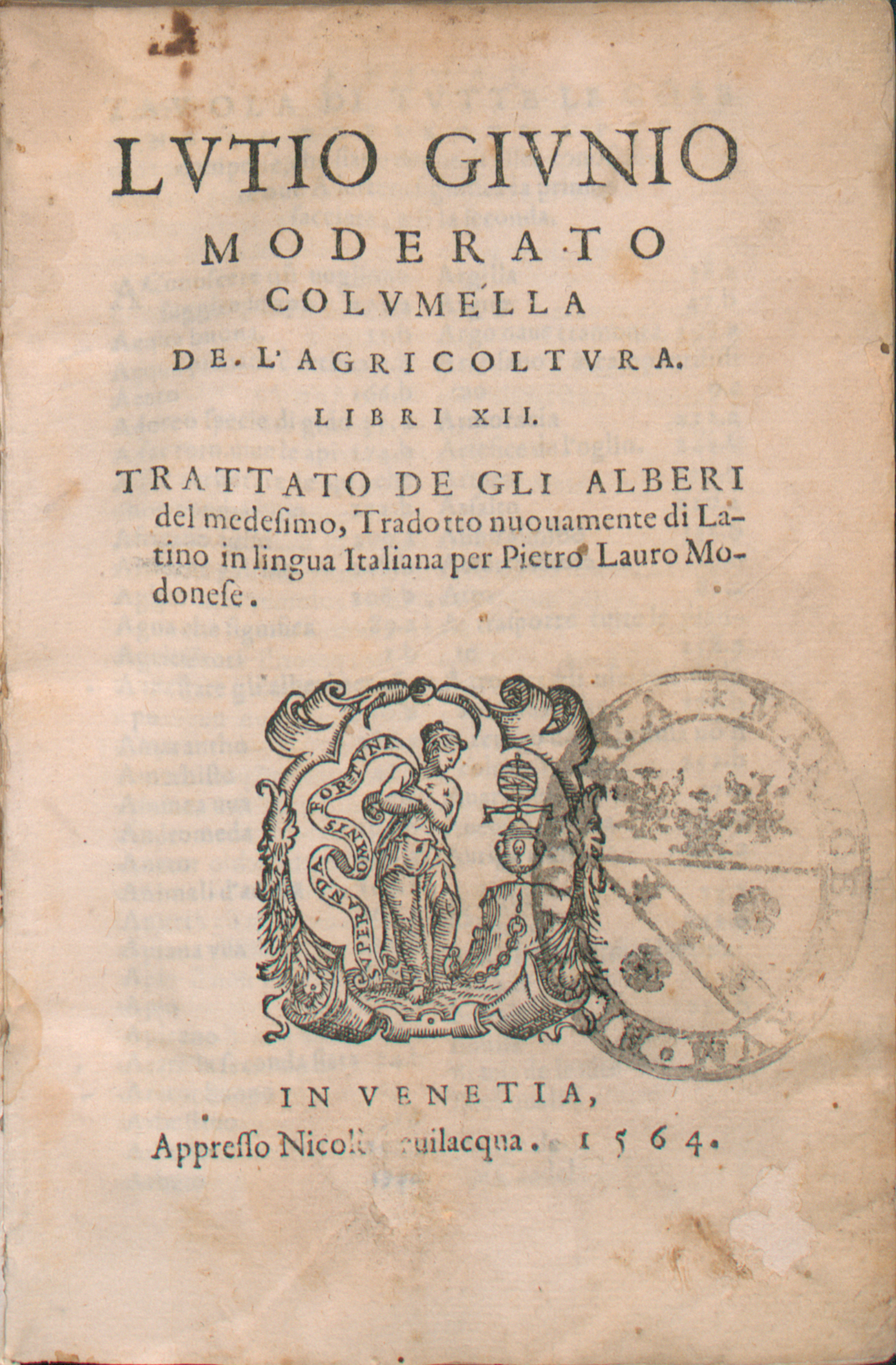
De re rustica, 1564

The short work De arboribus, "On Trees", is in manuscripts and early editions of Columella considered as book 3 of De re rustica. However, it is clear from the opening sentences that it is part of a separate and possibly earlier work. As the anonymous translator of the Millar edition notes, in De arboribus there is no mention of the Publius Silvinus to whom the De re rustica is addressed. A critical edition of the Latin text of the De re rustica includes it, but as incerti auctoris, by an unknown hand. Cassiodorus mentions sixteen books of Columella, which has led to the suggestion that De arboribus formed part of a work in four volumes.

=== Sources ===
In addition to Cato the Elder and Varro, Columella used many sources that are no longer extant and for which he is one of the few references. These include works by Aulus Cornelius Celsus, the Carthaginian writer Mago, Tremellius Scrofa, and many Greek sources. His uncle Marcus Columella, "a clever man and an exceptional farmer" (VII.2.30), had conducted experiments in sheep breeding, crossing colourful wild rams, introduced from Africa for gladiatorial games, with domestic sheep, and may have influenced his nephew's interests. Columella owned farms in Italy; he refers specifically to estates at Ardea, Carseoli, and Alba, and speaks repeatedly of his own practical experience in agriculture.

=== Editions ===
The earliest editions of Columella group his works with those on agriculture of Cato the Elder, Varro and Palladius. Some modern library catalogues follow Brunet in listing these under "Rei rusticae scriptores" or "Scriptores rei rusticae".

- Iunii Moderati Columellae hortulus [Rome: Printer of Silius Italicus, c. 1471] (book X only)
- Georgius Merula, Franciscus Colucia (eds.) De re rustica Opera et impensa Nicolai Ienson: Venetiis, 1472.
- Lucii Iunii Moderati Columellae de Cultu hortorum Liber .xi. quem .Pub. Virgilius .M. i[n] Georgicis Posteris edendum dimisit. [Padova]: D[ominicus] S[iliprandus], [ca. 1480]
- Opera Agricolationum: Columellæ: Varronis: Catonisque: nec non Palladii: cū excriptionibus .D. Philippi Beroaldi: & commentariis quæ in aliis impressionibus non extāt. Impensis Benedicti hectoris: Bonon., xiii. calen. octob. [19 Sept.], 1494
- Beroaldo, Filippo "il vecchio" Oratio de felicitate habita in enarratione Georgicon Virgilii et Columellae Bononiae: per Ioannemantonium De Benedictis, 1507
- Lucii Junii moderati Columell[ae] de cultu hortorum carme[n] : Necno[n] [et] Palladius de arboru[m] insitione una cu[m] Nicolai Barptholomaei Lochensis hortulo. Parisiis: Venundantur parisiis in aedibus Radulphi Laliseau [printed by Jean Marchant], [1512] (poetry sections only)
- Columella, Lucius Iunius Moderatus Columella De cultu ortorum. Interprete Pio Bononiensi. Impressum Bononiae: a Hieronymo de Benedictis bibliopola et calcographo, 1520 mense Augusto
- Libri De Re Rustica...Additis Nuper Commentariis Iunii Pompo. Fortunati in Librum De Cultu Hortorum, Cum Adnotationibus Philippi Beroaldi... Florence: Filippo Giunta, 1521
- De re rustica libri XII. Euisdem de Arboris liber, separatus ab aliis. Lyon, Sébastien Gryphe, 1541
- Columella, Lucius Iunius Moderatus De l'agricoltura libri XII. / Lutio Giunio Moderato Columella. Trattato de gli alberi, tradotto nuouamente di latino in lingua italiana per Pietro Lauro Modonese In Venetia: [Michele Tramezzino il vecchio], 1544
- Les Douze livres des choses rustiques. Traduicts de Latin en François, par feu maistre Claude Cotereau Chanoine de Paris. La traduction duquel ha esté soingneusement reveue & en la plupart corrigée, & illustrée de doctes annotations par maistre Jean Thierry de Beauvoisis Paris: Jacques Kerver, 1551, 1555
- Columella, Lucius Junius Moderatus Les douze liures ... des choses rustiques, tr. par C. Cotereau. La tr. corrigée & illustrée de doctes annotations par J. Thiery de Beauoisis Paris, 1555
- Columella, Lucius Iunius Moderatus Lutio Giunio Moderato Columella De l'agricoltura libri XII. Trattato de gli alberi del medesimo, tradotto nuouamente di latino in lingua italiana per Pietro Lauro modonese. In Venetia: per Geronimo Caualcalouo, 1559
  - Reprinted: In Venetia: appresso Nicolò Beuilacqua, 1564
- Orsini, Fulvio Notae ad M. Catonem, M. Varronem, L. Columellam de re rustica. Ad kalend. rusticum Farnesianum & veteres inscriptiones Fratrum Arvalium. Iunius Philargyrius in Bucolica & Georgica Virgilij. Notae ad Servium in Bucol. Georg. & Aeneid. Virg. Velius Longus de orthographia : ex bibliotheca Fulvi Ursini Romae: in aedib. S.P.Q.R. apud Georgium Ferrarium, 1587
- Bradley, Richard A Survey of the Ancient Husbandry and Gardening collected from Cato, Varro, Columella, Virgil, and others, the most eminent writers among the Greeks & Romans: wherein many of the most difficult passages in those authors are explain'd ... Adorn'd with cuts, etc. London: B. Motte, 1725
- Gesner, Johann Matthias (ed.) Scriptores Rei Rusticae veteres Latini Cato, Varro, Columella, Palladius, quibus nunc accedit Vegetius de Mulo-Medicina et Gargilii Martialis fragmentum (Ausoni Popinæ De instrumento fundi liber. J. B. Morgagni epist. IV.) cum editionibus prope omnibus et MSS. pluribus collati: adjectae notae virorum clariss, integræ ... et lexicon Rei Rusticae curante Io. Matthia Gesnero Lipsiae: sumtibus Caspari Fritsch, 1735 (full text)
- Lucius Junius Moderatus Columella (trans. Anon.) L. Junius Moderatus Columella of Husbandry, in Twelve Books: and his book, concerning Trees. Translated into English, with illustrations from Pliny, Cato, Varro, Palladius and other ancient and modern authors London: A. Millar, 1745
