= Karpień Castle =

Castle in Kłodzko County, Poland

Coordinates: 50.3310°N 16.9235°E

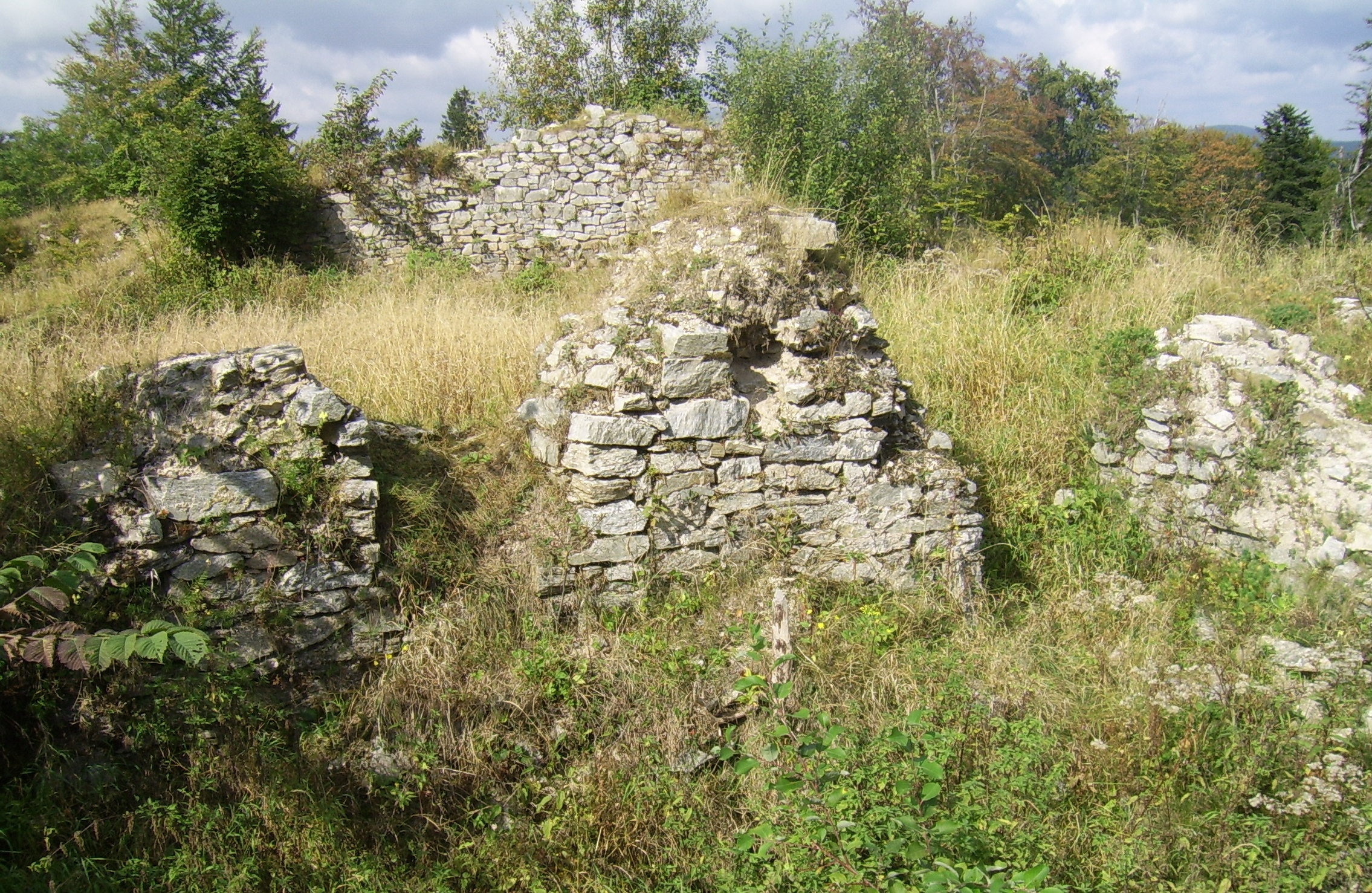
Castle ruin

A - inner courtyard B - castle courtyard S - stables W - watchtower 1 - donjon 2 - washroom 3 - kitchen 4 - food storage cellar

Karpień Castle (Polish: Zamek Karpień; German: Burg Karpenstein) is located in Kłodzko County in the Golden Mountains.

The castle was the seat of a small feudal state.
