= Nicholas IV, Duke of Opava =

Duke of Opava

- Born: c. 1400
- Died: 1437
- Noble family: Přemyslid dynasty
- Father: Przemko I, Duke of Opava
- Mother: Anna of Lutz

Duke Nicholas IV of Opava (Czech: Mikuláš IV. Opavský; German: Nikolaus IV. von Troppau; c. 1400 – 1437) was Duke of Opava and Lord of Zlaté Hory from 1433 until his death.

== Life ==
His parents were Duke Przemko I of Opava (d. 1433) and his first wife Anna of Lutz (d. 1405).

His father died in 1433 and left five sons. Nicholas IV, the second son, styled himself as Lord of Zlaté Hory. His elder brother Wenceslaus II acted as guardian for his younger half-brothers William, Ernest and Przemko II. Although their father had stipulated in his will that his Duchy should remain undivided, in 1435 the brothers divided the inheritance anyway. The Duchy of Głubczyce was split off from Opava for Wenceslaus II. Nicholas kept Zlaté Hory; William and Ernest shared the rest of Opava. The youngest brother, Przemko II, took up a career in the clergy and probably did not receive any land.

Nicholas IV died in 1437 unmarried and without issue. His eldest brother, Wenceslaus II, probably inherited Zlaté Hory.
