= Puta (mythology) =

Minor goddess in Roman mythology

In Roman mythology, according to Arnobius, Puta presided over the pruning of trees and was a minor goddess of agriculture.
