= Tremellius Scrofa =

List of several related Roman men

Tremellius Scrofa (sometimes, less properly, spelled Tremelius and Scropha) was the name of several related Roman men, among whom:

Lucius Tremellius Scrofa, quaestor in 143 BC, who served as a general in the war against Philip VII of Macedonia
Gnaeus Tremellius Scrofa, quaestor in 73 BC, defeated by Spartacus
Gaius Tremellius Scrofa, praetor in 52 BC
Gnaeus Tremellius Scrofa, an important Roman agronomist and author of the Augustan period, whose writings have not survived, but are known to us from scant passages in the De re rustica of Columella; he appears as a character in the similarly titled work by Varro.

An unusual etiological tale is told in Macrobius (Sat. I.6.30) of the origin of the family cognomen Scrofa (sow).
