= Rutilius Taurus Aemilianus Palladius =

4th/5th century Greco-Roman writer

Rutilius Taurus Aemilianus Palladius, also known as Palladius Rutilius Taurus Aemilianus or most often just as Palladius, was an ancient writer who wrote in Latin, and is dated variously to the later 4th century or first half of the 5th century AD. He is principally known for his book on agriculture, Opus agriculturae, sometimes known as De re rustica.

== Life ==
Since the Middle Ages, authors of agricultural treatises have referred often to Palladius. The Palladii were a prominent Gallic family, and the name Palladius is probably a family name (of Greek origin), with Aemilianus his cognomen (of Roman origin). In late antiquity, the convention of the tria nomina ("three names") for Roman men was no longer standard, and the greater variation in naming practice contributes to the uncertainty over the correct order of his names. Evidence for his life is scant. Manuscripts of his work call him a vir illustris, which would indicate high rank. Although Palladius relies heavily on earlier agricultural writers, he himself owned farms in Italy and Sardinia, and had considerable experience of farming, with a special interest in fruit trees.

== Works ==
The Opus agriculturae is a treatise on farming in 14 parts or books, written in the late fourth or early fifth century AD. The first book is general and introductory. Books 2 to 13 give detailed instructions for the typical activities on a Roman farm for each month of the year, starting with January. Each of these calendrical books has sections on field crops, vegetable gardens, fruit trees and other trees, and livestock. The fourteenth book, De Veterinaria Medicina, was rediscovered only in the 20th century, and gives instructions for the care of animals and elements of veterinary science. All of this is in prose, but Palladius also appended a poem, De Insitione, On Grafting, consisting of eighty-five couplets of elegiac verse.

Palladius' work stands in the tradition of Roman agricultural treatises, represented particularly by Cato the Elder, Marcus Terentius Varro, Columella, and Gargilius Martialis. His chief contribution was to reduce the exhaustive works of Columella and Martialis to an appropriate scale for the practical farmer, while at the same time re-organising them on a calendrical basis, to provide the farmer with a checklist of the tasks needing attention each month.

The work of Palladius was well known in the Middle Ages. A translation into Middle English verse survives from about 1420, entitled On Husbondrie; it can be seen as part of a genre of instructional agricultural writing that was to develop in England into works such as those of Thomas Tusser and Gervase Markham. Two notable thirteenth century works that draw on Palladius are the Commoda ruralia of Petrus de Crescentius, written c. 1305 and printed at Augsburg in 1471; and the Speculum Maius of Vincentius Bellovacensis (Vincent de Beauvais) written about 1250 and first printed in Strasbourg in 1473–76. There are a number of other incunabula or early editions.

=== Water-mills ===
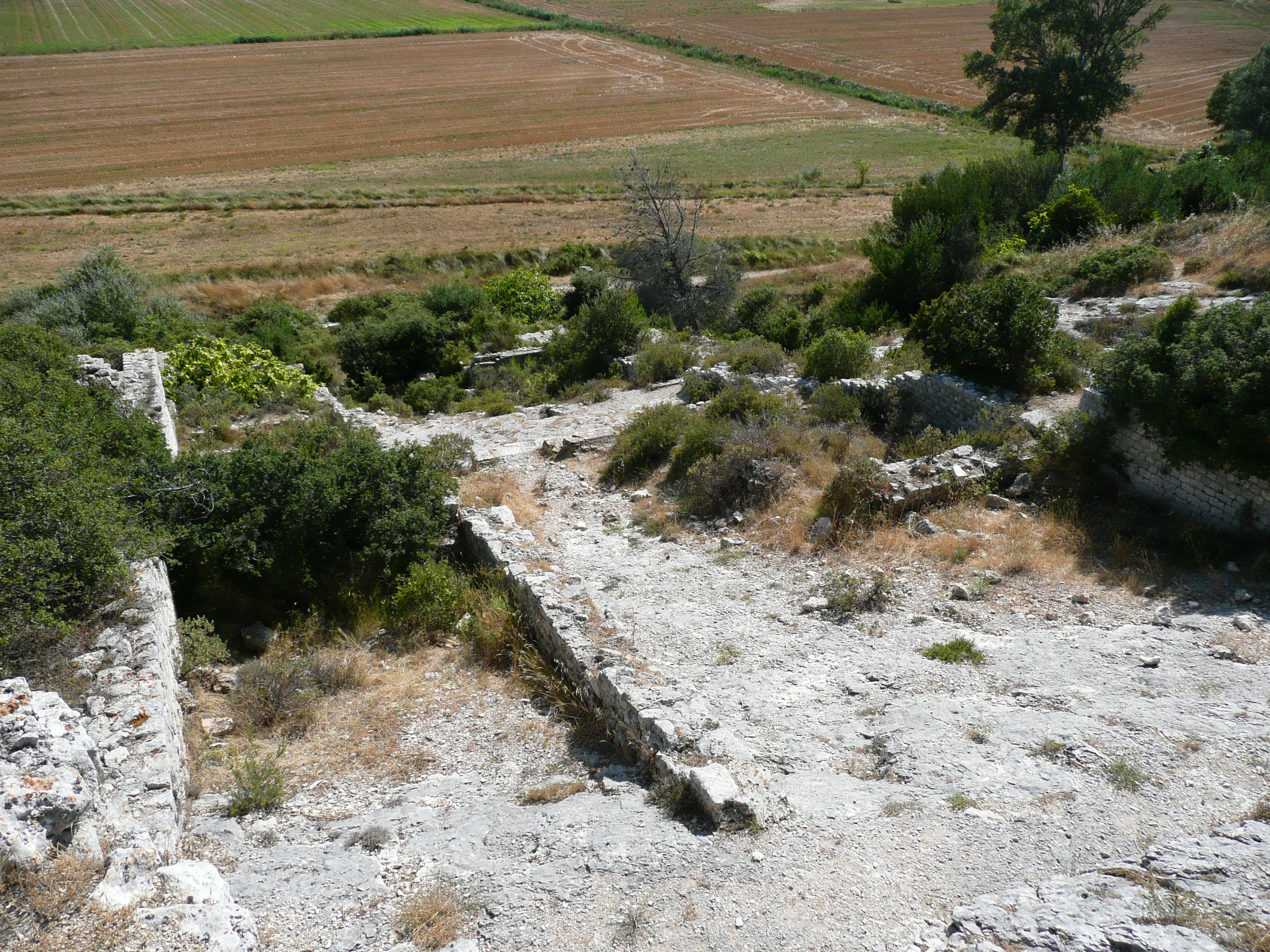
The sixteen overshot wheels at Barbegal are considered the largest ancient mill complex. Their capacity was sufficient to feed the whole nearby city of Arles

The book is known for reference to a water-mill in Book 1, ch. 41, where Palladius suggests that waste water from bath buildings should be used to drive a mill. Such mills had been described by Vitruvius in 25 BC, and there is a growing number of examples of such Roman water-mills. The most spectacular is the set of 16 mills at Barbegal in southern France, using water fed by a stone aqueduct along the line of the same aqueduct which supplied nearby Arles.

== Principal early editions ==
The earliest editions of Palladius group his works with those on agriculture of Cato the Elder, Varro and Columella. Some modern library catalogues follow Brunet in listing these under "Rei rusticae scriptores" or "Scriptores rei rusticae".

- Georgius Merula, Franciscus Colucia (eds.) De re rustica. Opera et impensa Nicolai Ienson: Venetiis, 1472
- Rei rusticae authores. Regii: opera et impensis Bartholomei Bruschi al' Botoni, Regiensis, 1482
- Opera Agricolationum: Columellæ: Varronis: Catonisque: nec non Palladii: cū excriptionibus. D. Philippi Beroaldi: & commentariis quæ in aliis impressionibus non extāt. Impensis Benedicti hectoris: Bonon., xiii. calen. octob. [19 September], 1494
- Lucii Junii moderati Columell[ae] de cultu hortorum carme[n]: Necno[n] [et] Palladius de arboru[m] insitione una cu[m] Nicolai Barptholomaei Lochensis hortulo. Parisiis: Venundantur parisiis in aedibus Radulphi Laliseau [printed by Jean Marchant], [1512]
- Libri De Re Rvstica: M. Catonis Lib. I. M. Terentii Varronis Lib. III. L. Ivnii Moderati Colv-mellae Lib. XII. Eiusdem de arboribus liber separatus ab alijs, quare autem id fa-ctum fuerit: ostenditur in epistola ad lectorem. Palladii Lib. XIIII. De duobus dierum generibus: simulq[ue] de umbris, & horis, quæ apud Palladium, in alia epistola ad lectorem. Georgij Alexandrini enarrationes priscarum dictionum, quæ in his libris Catonis: Varronis: Columellæ. Venetiis: In aedibus Aldi et Andreae soceri, mense Maio, 1514
- Libri de re rustica a Nicolao Angelio viro consumatissimo nuper maxima diligentia recogniti et typis excusi, cum indice & expositione omnium dictionum. Catonis, Varronis, Collumellæ, Palladij quæ aliqua enucleatione indigebant. M. Catonis Lib. I. M. Terentij Varronis Lib. III. L Junij Moderati Columellæ Lib XII. Ejusdem de arboribus liber separatus ab alijs. Palladij Lib XIIII. De duobus dierum generibus simulq[ue]; de umbris & oris, quæ apud Palladium. Impressum Florentiæ: Philippi Iuntæ, [1515]
- Richard Bradley A Survey of the Ancient Husbandry and Gardening collected from Cato, Varro, Columella, Virgil, and others, the most eminent writers among the Greeks & Romans: wherein many of the most difficult passages in those authors are explain'd ... Adorn'd with cuts, etc.. London: B. Motte, 1725
- Johann Matthias Gesner (ed.) Scriptores Rei Rusticae veteres Latini Cato, Varro, Columella, Palladius, quibus nunc accedit Vegetius de Mulo-Medicina et Gargilii Martialis fragmentum (Ausoni Popinæ De instrumento fundi liber. J. B. Morgagni epist. IV.) cum editionibus prope omnibus et MSS. pluribus collati: adjectae notae virorum clariss. integræ ... et lexicon Rei Rusticae curante Io. Matthia Gesnero. Lipsiae: sumtibus Caspari Fritsch, 1735

== See also ==
- Ancient Rome and wine
