= Půta II of Častolovice =

- Noble family: Častolovice
- Spouse: Anna of Oświęcim

Půta II of Častolovice (also known as Půta the Elder; first name sometimes spelled as Puota or Puotha, last name sometimes spelled as Častolowitz or Czastolowitz; Czech: Půta II. z Častolovic; d. after 1402) was an east Bohemian nobleman. He was a member of the noble Častolovice family.

Půta was mentioned for the first time in 1365, together with his father of the same name (Půta I of Častolovice). During the life of his father, he was called "Půta the Younger", later, to distinguish from his own son, "Půta the Elder".

He was married to Anna (d. between 1440 and 1454), a daughter of Duke Jan II of Oświęcim. They had a son and two daughters. Their son, Půta III or Půta the Younger (d. 1434) was Landeshauptmann and later pledge lord of the County of Kladsko and the Duchies of Ząbkowice Śląskie and Münsterberg.
