= John II of Opava =

John II, Duke of Opava
- Opava coat of arms
- Born: c. 1425
- Died: c. 1485
- Noble family: Přemyslid dynasty
- Spouse: Catherine
- Father: Wenceslaus II, Duke of Opava
- Mother: Elisabeth of Kravař

John II, Duke of Troppau (also known as John "the Pious" of Leobschütz, John of Głubczyce, Czech: Jan III Opavský or Jan Pobožný; c. 1425 – c. 1485) was a Duke of Silesia from the Opava branch of the Přemyslid dynasty. He was co-ruler of the Duchy of Opava from 1445/1457 to 1464 and of the Duchy of Głubczyce from 1445/1457 until his death.

== Life ==
His parents were Duke Wenceslas II of Opava and Głubczyce and his wife Elizabeth of Kravař.

His father died around 1445-1447 and John II inherited a third of the Duchy of Opava and, jointly with his elder brother John I, the Duchy of Głubczyce. John I died in 1464 and John II inherited his title of Lord of Fulnek.

The other two thirds of Opava were held by his paternal uncles William and Ernest. In 1451, William transferred his claim on the Duchy of Münsterberg to Ernest and received Ernest's third of Opava in return. Thus, William owned a two-thirds share of Opava. However, William died the following year and Ernest, acting as guardian for William's underage sons, sold this share to Duke Bolko V of Opole. Bolko V died in 1460, and his share of Opava fell to King George of Bohemia as a completed fief. In 1464, John II sold his one-third share to George, who thereby came into full possession of Opava, thus considerably expanding his sphere of influence.

In the armed conflict about George's succession, John II initially supported Vladislaus II. After Matthias Corvinus conquered Silesia in 1479, John II paid him homage.

In 1480, he founded a Franciscan monastery in Głubczyce.

John II was married to a Catherine of unknown descent. She died without issue in 1485. His nickname "the Pious" allegedly refers to the fact that he didn't remarry after her death.

John II died c. 1485. With his death the main Opava line of the Přemyslid dynasty died out, although the Opava-Ratibor line continued to exist until 1521. The Duchy of Głubczyce fell to King Matthias as a completed fief. Matthias gave it to 1490 Petr Haugwitz de Biskupitz.
