= Jan II of Oświęcim =

Jan II
- Duke of Oświęcim
- Coat-of-arms of Upper Silesia (Opole, Oświęcim, etc)
- Born: c. 1330
- Died: 19 February 1376
- Noble family: Silesian Piasts of Opole
- Spouse: Jadwiga of Brzeg
- Issue: Jan III of Oświęcim; Anna; Katarzyna
- Father: Jan I the Scholastic
- Mother: unknown

Jan II of Oświęcim (Polish: Jan II oświęcimski; c. 1330 – 19 February 1376) was a Duke of Oświęcim since 1372 until his death.

He was the only known son of Jan I the Scholastic, Duke of Oświęcim, by his unknown first wife.

== Life ==
Jan II took the full government over Oświęcim after his father's death on 29 September 1372. This was subsequently confirmed by the King Wenceslaus IV of Bohemia on 9 October of that year. The new Duke, however, had to accept named Przemysław I Noszak, Duke of Cieszyn his sole heir. In this case, was ignored the fact that Jan II had already a namesake son. Perhaps, just as in the case of Jan I, the future Jan III was originally destined for a Church career.

During almost all his rule, Jan II had considerable financial difficulties, because he was committed to repay the sum illegally obtained by his father from the Scholastic of Kraków.

Little is known about the rest of Jan II's reign. The last document he was mentioned in was from 1 June 1375. His wife was mentioned as a widow in document of his father-in-law Ludwik I the Fair from 8 September 1376. In the anniversary of the St. Jadwiga Collegiate Church in Brzeg there is mention about Jan, duke of Oświęcim, died on 19 February.

He could be buried in the Dominican church of Oświęcim, but there is no sources about his buried place.

== Marriage and issue ==
By 1366, Jan II married with Jadwiga (c. 1344–1351 – 30 January 1386 or 1396), daughter of Ludwik I the Fair, Duke of Brzeg. They had three children:

1. Jan III (c. 1366–1376 – 1405).
2. Anna (c. 1366–1376 – died between 6 September 1440 and 12 April 1454). married firstly before 1397 to Půta II of Častolovice and secondly before 1412 to some Alexander, a Dux. From her first marriage, she was the mother of Půta III of Častolovice, later Duke of Ziębice.
3. Katarzyna (c. 1366–1376 – after 5 November 1403).

Jan II of Oświęcim House of Piast Born: c. 1344/51 Died: 19 February 1376
Preceded by Jan I the Scholastic	Duke of Oświęcim; 1372–1376	Succeeded by Jan III
