= Henryków, Lower Silesian Voivodeship =

Henryków
- Village
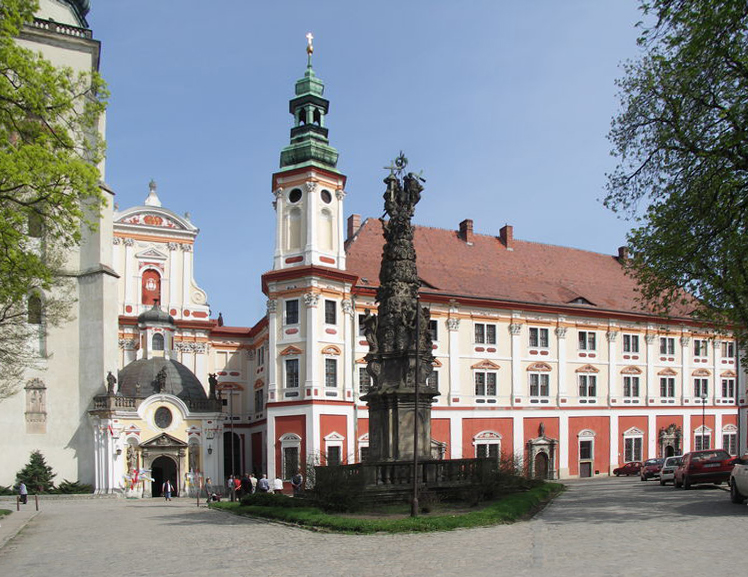
- Cistercian monastery

- Location within Poland
- Coordinates: 50°39′09″N 17°00′39″E
- Country: Poland
- Voivodeship: Lower Silesian
- County: Ząbkowice
- Gmina: Ziębice
- First mentioned: 1222
- Population: 1,400
- Time zone: UTC+1 (CET)
  - Summer (DST): UTC+2 (CEST)
- Vehicle registration: DZA

Henryków [xɛnˈrɨkuf] is a village in the administrative district of Gmina Ziębice, within Ząbkowice County, Lower Silesian Voivodeship, in south-western Poland.

The village contains the landmark Cistercian Monastery Complex. A Latin chronicle, the Book of Henryków, compiled at Henryków abbey in the 13th century contains the first known sentence written in the Polish language, it also contains a military-med katholic highschool.

There is a train station in Henryków.

== Gallery ==
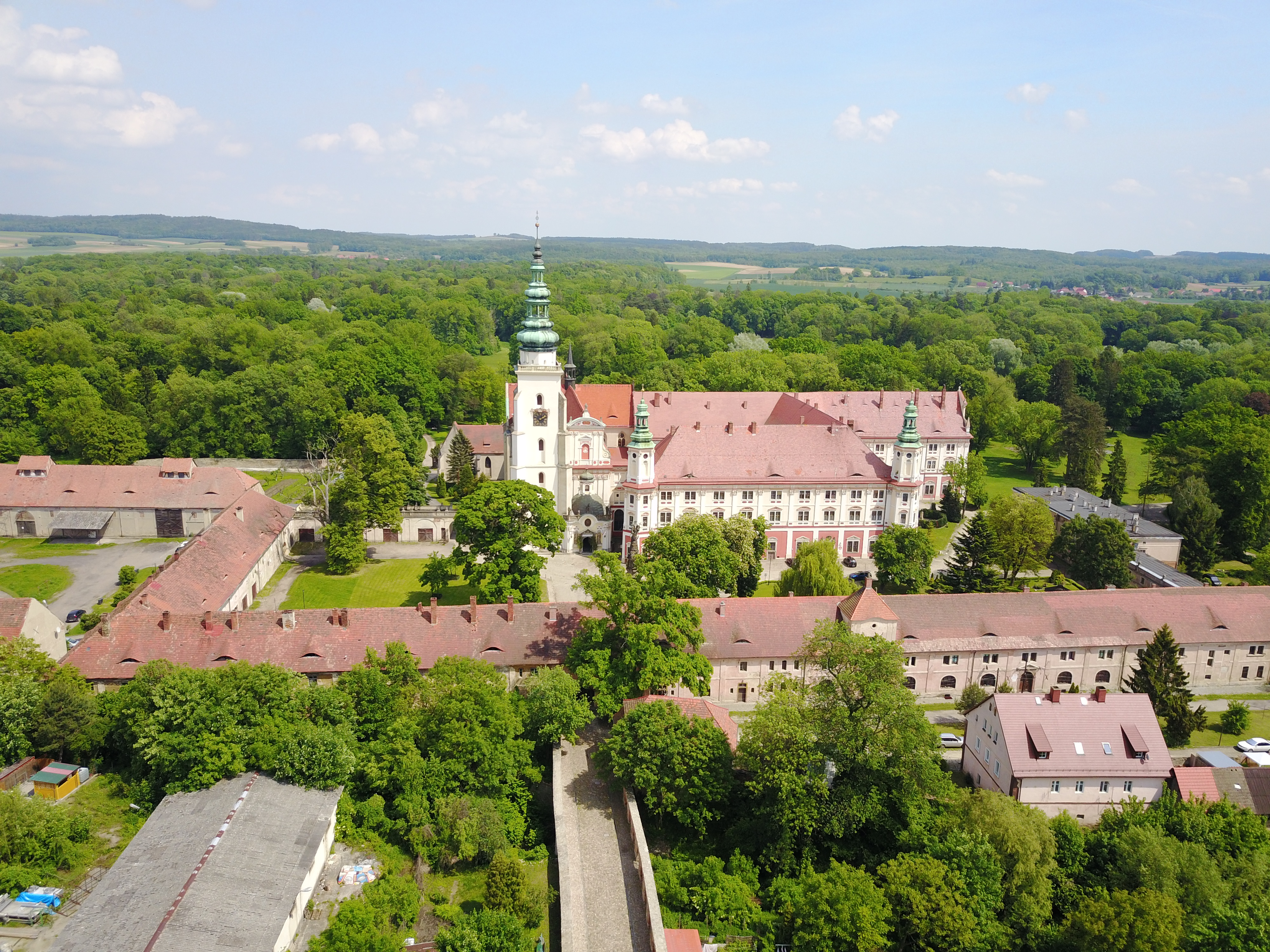
Aerial view of the Cistercian Monastery

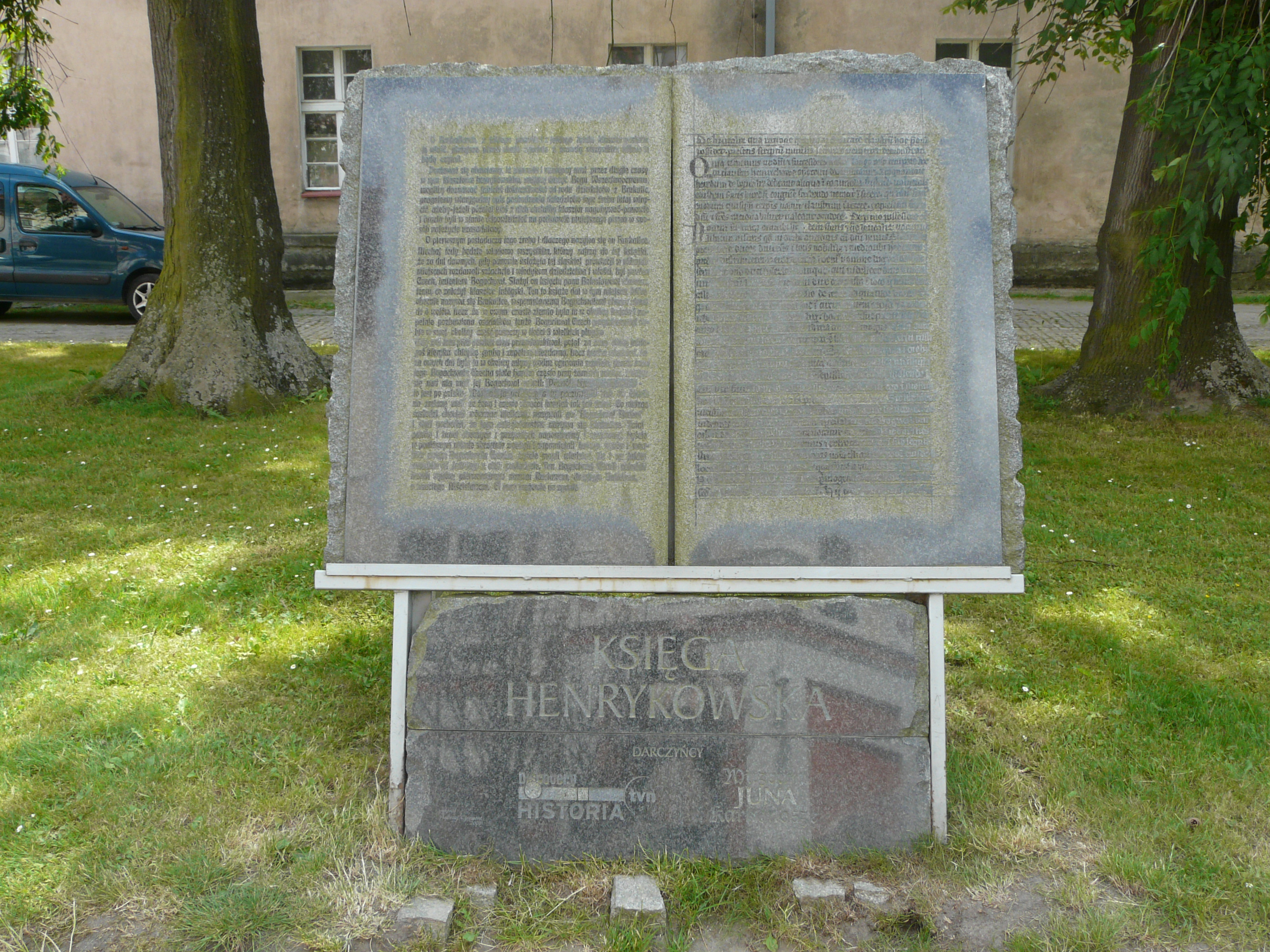
Monument to the Book of Henryków

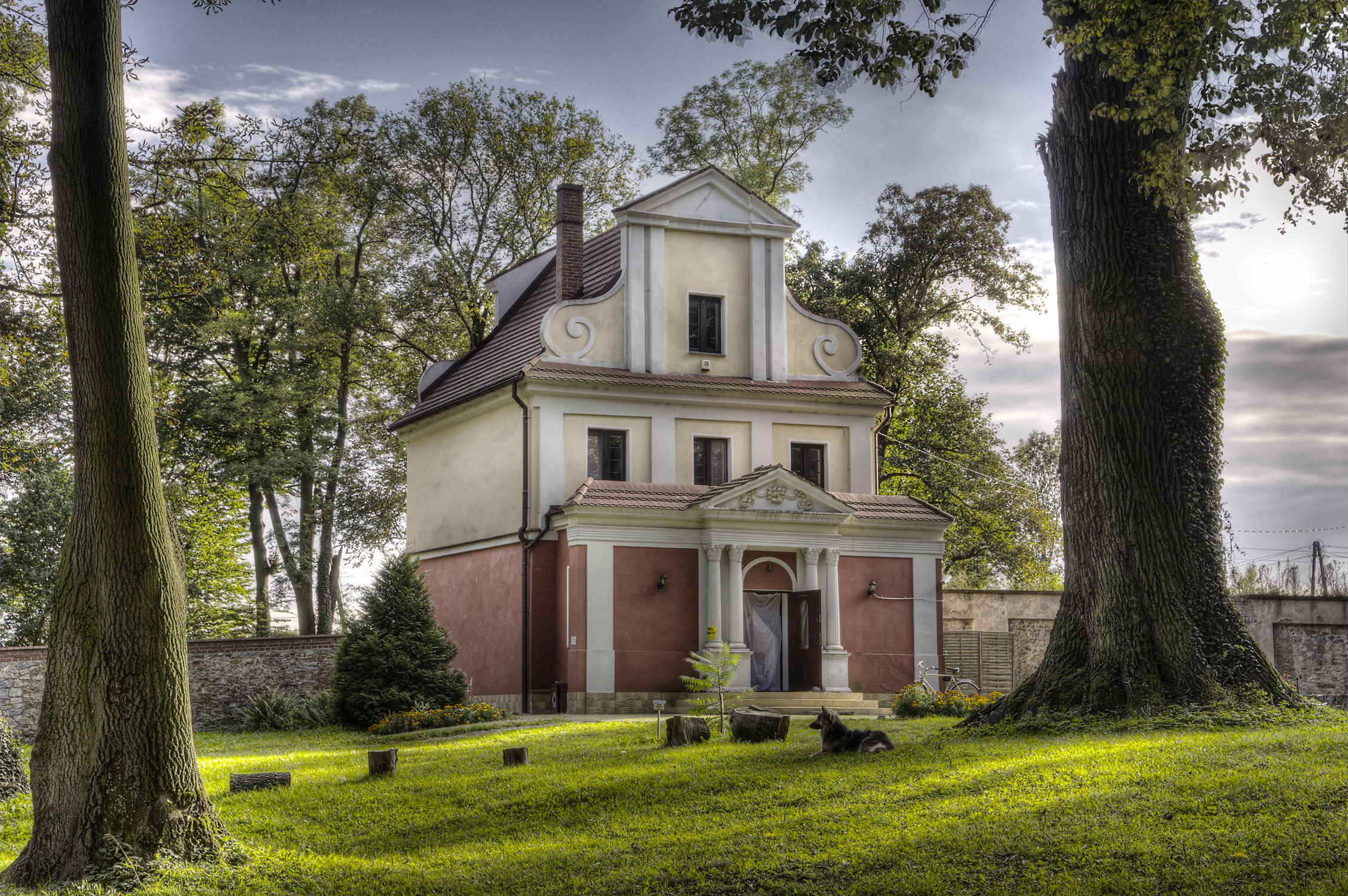
Brama Parkowa (Park Gate)

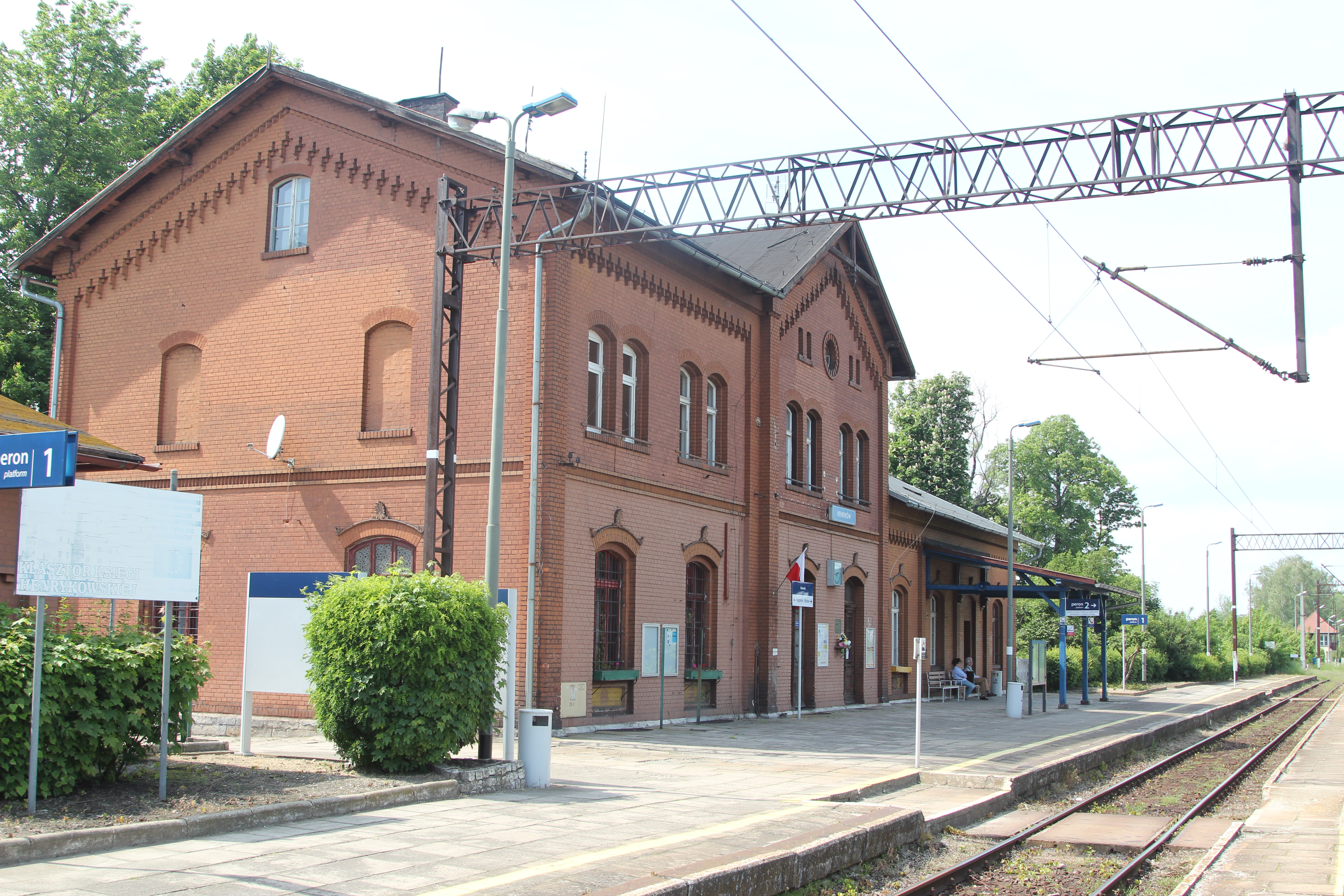
Train station

== Surroundings ==
- Cistercian Monastery Complex in Henryków
- Gola Dzierżoniowska Castle
- Niemcza (medieval town)
