= Ernest, Duke of Opava =

- Born: c. 1415
- Died: 1464
- Noble family: Přemyslids
- Father: Przemko I, Duke of Opava
- Mother: Catherine of Münsterberg

Ernest of Opava (German: Ernst von Troppau; Czech: Arnošt Opavský; c. 1415 – 1464) was a member of the Opava branch of the Přemyslid dynasty. He was Duke of Opava (German: Troppau) from 1433 to 1461 and Duke of Münsterberg (Czech: Ziębice) from 1452 to 1456.

== Life ==
His parents were Duke Przemko I of Opava and Catherine, the sister of John, who was the last Piast Duke of Münsterberg. When his father died in 1433, Ernest inherited jointly with his four brothers. Although his father had asked in his will that they rule jointly, the brothers divided their inheritance among themselves in 1434 or 1435.

In 1451, his elder brother William gave him the Duchy of Münsterberg in exchange for his one third share of the Duchy of Opava. This meant William possessed a 2/3 share of Opava.

After William's death in 1452, the Duchy of Münsterberg fell to Ernest, according to the agreement of 1451. Ernest also took up the guardianship of William's children. As their guardian, he sold William's 2/3 share of the Opava to Duke Bolko V of Opole, after 1454. On 8 March 1456, he sold the Duchy of Münsterberg to the provincial administrator and future King of Bohemia, George of Poděbrady.

Bolko V died in 1460 and his heir Nicholas I sold the 2/3 share of Opava to George of Poděbrady. In 1464, George purchased the remaining third from John II, thereby significantly increasing his political and economic influence in Silesia.

Ernest died in 1464, unmarried and without issue.
