= John I of Münsterberg =

John I
- Duke of Ziębice/Münsterberg
- Coat-of-arms of Ziębice
- Born: c. 1380
- Died: 27 December 1428
- Noble family: Silesian Piasts
- Spouse: Elizabeth Lackfi
- Father: Bolko III of Ziębice
- Mother: Euphemia of Bytom

John I of Münsterberg (c. 1380 – 27 December 1428) was a Duke of Münsterberg (Ziębice) from 1410 until his death; until 1420 with his brother as co-ruler.

He was the second son of Duke Bolko III of Münsterberg by his wife Euphemia, daughter of Duke Bolesław of Bytom.

== Life ==
The death of his older brother Nicholas (on 9 November 1405) made him his father's heir. Bolko III died in 1410 and was succeeded by John. Like his father, he did not need a regent, since he was an adult at the time. John nominally co-ruled with his younger brother Henry II, but he retained all the government in his hands. Henry II died childless in 1420 and since then John ruled over Münsterberg alone. Like his father and grandfather, he remained a faithful vassal of the House of Luxembourg.

During the first years of his rule the Polish–Lithuanian–Teutonic War took place. He participated there at the side of the Teutonic Order; however, his interference in the war was limited, especially after the Battle of Tuchola (4 November 1410), where he escaped from the battlefield with other noble and Teutonic knights.

On 6 January 1420 John was present in the Reichstag of Breslau (Wrocław), where he spent a major disincentive to the Polish sentence in the process against the Teutonic Order.

The previous politics of his predecessors was negligible, so when John assumed the government over his Duchy, he only had the town of Münsterberg. For this reasons, he married around 19 March 1408 with Elizabeth (d. 22 February/27 December 1424), widow of the powerful Polish magnate Spytek II of Melsztyn and daughter of Emeric I Lackfi, General Starost of Ruthenia, Ban of Dalmatia (Transylvanian Voivodship) and of Hungary. Thanks to this union, John obtain a huge dowry and the needed financial autonomy. The case was more strange by the fact that Elisabeth's first husband was one of the most closest advisers of King Władysław II Jogaila of Poland, the long-time enemy of John's sovereign, the Sigismund of Luxembourg, King of Hungary and Germany. Moreover, despite the hostile politics of King Sigismund, Elizabeth successfully continued with her many Polish contacts, even after her remarriage with the Duke of Münsterberg. The union proved to be childless, so John was the last male representative of Münsterberg branch of the Piast dynasty.

By 1428 Silesia was in the middle of the Hussite Wars. Initially, seeing no chances of victory, Duke Louis II of Brieg entered into an arrangement with John, under which he was compelled to not interfere with the movements of enemy troops. However, for unknown reasons, John broke the ceasefire, and with this he began his participation in the war.

John died on 27 December 1428 in the battle of Altwilmsdorf (Stary Wielisław), in the Valley of Glatz (Kłodzko), fighting against the Hussite leader Jan Kralovca. The cause of the disaster was a thoughtless attack of the Hussite troops, or earthwork built wagons from the battle. It's unknown where John was buried. On the alleged place of the Duke's death was built a Chapel during 1904–1905 designed by Ludwig Schneider.

After his death, and according to the treaty of 1343, the Duchy of Münsterberg was annexed by the Kingdom of Bohemia.

John I of Münsterberg House of Piast Born: c. 1380 Died: 27 August 1428
Preceded by Bolko III	Duke of Ziębice with Henry II (until 1420); 1410–1428	Vacant Annexed to the Kingdom of Bohemia Title next held by Půta III of Častolovice
