= Půta III of Častolovice =

Czech nobleman

- Died: 1434; Pressburg
- Noble family: Častolovice
- Spouse: Anna of Koldice
- Father: Půta II of Častolovice
- Mother: Anna of Oświęcim

Půta III of Častolovice (also known as Puota the Younger of Czastolowitz; Czech: Půta III. z Častolovic or Půta mladší z Častolovic; d. 1434 in Pressburg) was a member of the Bohemian Častolowitz family. He was Landeshauptmann and later pledge lord of the County of Kladsko and the Duchies of Ząbkowice Śląskie and Münsterberg.

== Life ==
His parents were Půta II of Častolovice and Anna, a daughter of Duke Jan II of Oświęcim. Like his father, he owned the Lordship of Častolovice and other territories in eastern Bohemia.

Půta was initially a supporter of the Hussites, but soon turned into one of their fiercest opponents. Probably because of the zeal he distinguished himself with in this war, King Sigismund of Bohemia appointed him in 1422 as royal governor of the County of Kladsko and the district of Ząbkowice Śląskie. In 1424, Půta concluded an alliance with Duke John I of Münsterberg against the Hussites. This was probably the reason why the Hussites attacked Kladsko and Silesia in December 1425. In 1426, Sigismund sold the mint right in Kladsko to Půta. In 1427, Půta fought with a Silesian army in eastern Bohemia against the Hussites. In 1428, Půta fought in the battle of Stary Wielisław, where Duke John I was killed. Münsterberg fell as a completed fief to King Sigismund, who mortgaged it to Půta on 13 August 1429. In 1431, he also mortgaged the County of Kladsko and the district of Ząbkowice Śląskie to him. In 1434, he enfeoffed him with the Duchy of Münsterberg.

Půta carried out several diplomatic missions for King Sigismund. Shortly before his death, he accompanied envoys from the Council of Basel to Sigismund's court.

Půta's political aim was to create a territory for his family on both sides of the border between Silesia and eastern Bohemia. In 1396, he married Anna of Koldice (d. 1467), a daughter of governor Albert of the Duchy of Jawor. This marriage created favourable conditions for his goal.

Půta III died in 1434 without a male heir. He left three underage daughters:

- Anna, married in 1446 to Ulrich of Zajíc of Hasenburg
- Catherine (d. before 1467), married:
  1. in 1441 or 1442 to Heralt II of Líšničtí, a member of the noble Kunštát family
  2. in 1447 to John Zajíc of Hasenburg, who after Catherine's death remarried to a daughter of Duke Wencelaus II
- Salome (d. 1489), married around 1442 to Duke William, Duke of Opava of Opava, a nephew of Duke John I

Půta's widow Anna, who held the mortgage bonds for Kladsko, Ząbkowice Śląskie and Münsterberg, administered her estates together with governor Marquard Ahrlik of Międzylesie. After negotiating with several interested parties, she sold her possessions to Hynek Krušina of Lichtenburg, who also took over her burdensome debts and the obligation to raise her daughters in style. Three weeks later, he married her.
