= Duke of Silesia =

Title in the Polish nobility

The Duke of Silesia was the title of sons and descendants of the Polish Duke Bolesław III Wrymouth. In accordance with the last will and testament of Bolesław, upon his death, his lands were divided into four or five hereditary provinces distributed among his sons, and a royal province of Kraków was reserved for the eldest, who was to be High Duke of all Poland. This was known as the fragmentation of Poland. Subsequent developments led to further splintering of the duchies.

At the beginning of the 14th century, fourteen independent Duchies existed in Silesia: Brzeg, Wrocław, Świdnica, Jawor, Ziębice, Głogów, Ścinawa, Żagan and Oleśnica in Lower Silesia; Koźle, Cieszyn, Bytom, Niemodlin, Opole, Strzelce, Racibórz and Opava in Upper Silesia and the ecclesiastical Duchy of Nysa. Between 1327 and 1329, most dukes accepted the overlordship of Bohemian king John of Bohemia, who acquired the right of succession for all of these duchies. In the coming centuries, all branches of the Silesian Piasts died out, and with the death of George William, Duke of Liegnitz the dynasty ceased to exist.

== Duchy of Silesia ==

The Duchy of Silesia, one of the hereditary provinces of Poland, Silesia, was granted to Bolesław III's eldest son, Władysław II the Exile, and was subsequently divided among his sons Bolesław I the Tall (Wrocław/Lower Silesia), Mieszko I Tanglefoot (Racibórz/Upper Silesia) and Konrad Spindleshanks (Głogów). After Konrad's death Głogów was again united with the Duchy of Wrocław/Lower Silesia.

=== Partitions of Silesia ===
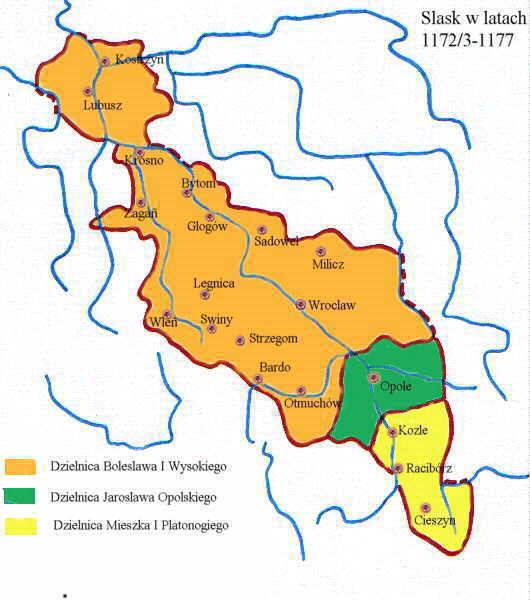

In 1173, Bolesław returned and he agreed to let Mieszko and Bolesław rule in their own Duchies, separated from the Duchy of Silesia. This led to the creation of the Duchy of Racibórz for Mieszko I and the Duchy of Opole for Jarosław, beginning the fragmentation of the Duchy of Silesia. The territories controlled by Mieszko I and Jarosław roughly corresponded to what is known as Upper Silesia, while the territories remaining with Bolesław I roughly corresponded to Lower Silesia.

==== Lower Silesia ====
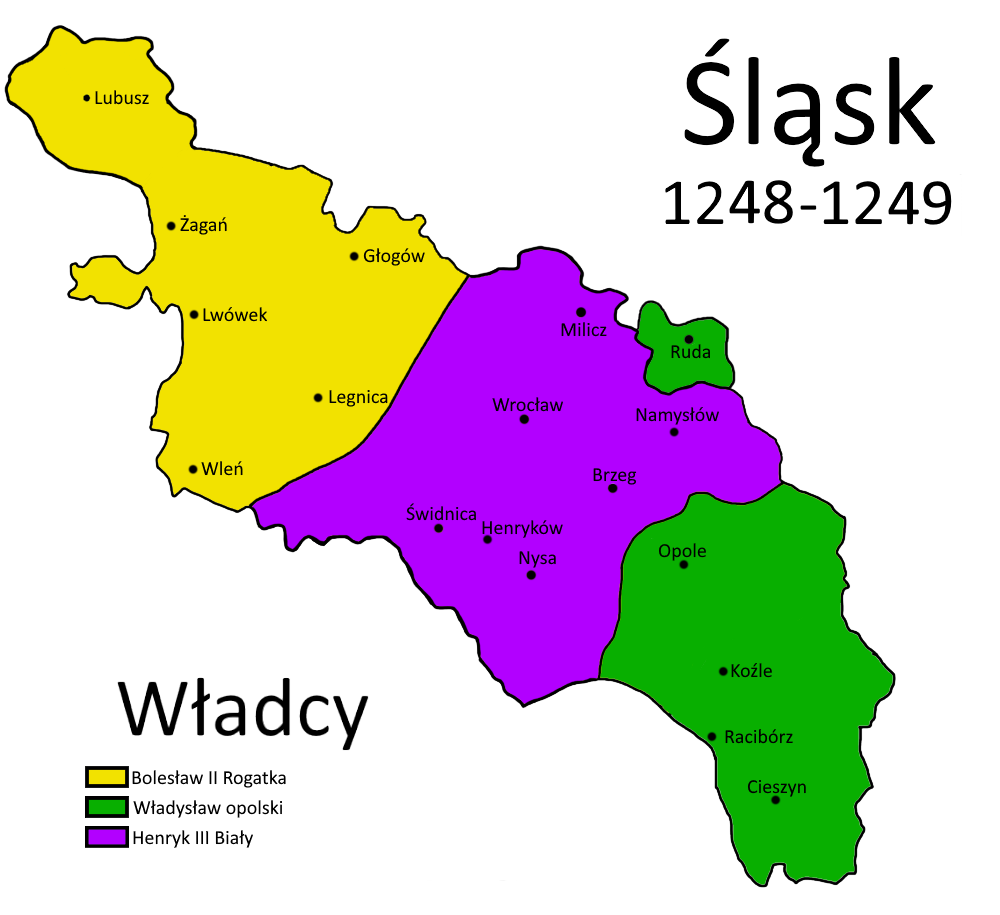

Duchy of Lower Silesia was a direct continuation of the Duchy of Silesia, but without the territories roughly corresponding to Upper Silesia; hence, it was composed of the territories roughly corresponding to Lower Silesia. Some sources refer to it as the Duchy of Silesia; some as the Duchy of Lower Silesia; others yet as the Duchy of Wrocław (Breslau). Wrocław was the capital of the Duchy of Silesia, yet this early (1172–1248) Duchy of Silesia should not be confused with the smaller Duchy of Wrocław that was created with further fragmentation in 1248.

The Duchy went through various border changes in the coming years, sometimes losing and sometimes gaining territory. In 1248, Lower Silesia was divided when Bolesław II had to cede the Duchy of Wrocław to his younger brother Henry III.

==== Upper Silesia ====
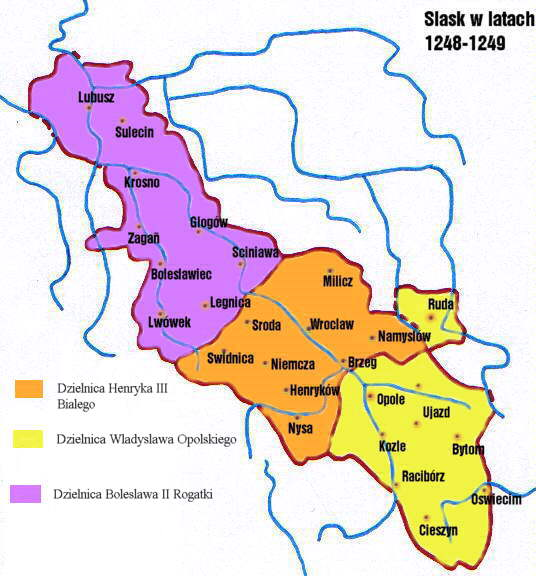

Upper Silesia was divided into the Duchies of Cieszyn and Opole-Racibórz. In 1340, the Duchy of Racibórz was united with Opava, a Bohemian fief.

=== Piast Dukes of Silesia ===
==== Partitions of Polish Silesia under the Piast dynasty ====
Below follows a simplified table of Silesia's partitions:

Duchy of Silesia (1138–1163)
									Opole-Racibórz (Upper Silesia) (1st creation) (1163–1282)
Wrocław (Lower Silesia) (1163–1335)					Legnica (1st creation) (1241–1449)				Opole (1282–1521)	Bytom (1282–1357)	Racibórz (1282–1340)
Wrocław (Lower Silesia) (1163–1335)	Głogów (1st creation) (1274–1331)	Oleśnica (1312–1492)	Żagań (1309–1504)		Legnica (1st creation) (1241–1449)		Świdnica-Jawor (1274–1392)	Ziębice (1312–1442)	Opole (1282–1521)	Bytom (1282–1357)	Racibórz (1282–1340)		Oświęcim (1315–1457) and Zator (1445–1513)
Wrocław (Lower Silesia) (1163–1335)	Annexed to Bohemia (1331–49)	Oleśnica (1312–1492)	Żagań (1309–1504)		Legnica (1st creation) (1241–1449)		Świdnica-Jawor (1274–1392)	Ziębice (1312–1442)	Opole (1282–1521)	Bytom (1282–1357)	Racibórz (1282–1340)	Cieszyn (1281–1653)	Oświęcim (1315–1457) and Zator (1445–1513)
Annexed to Bohemia	Shared inheritance of Żagań (1349–1480), with Świdnica-Jawor (1349–1368), Bohemia (1368–1384) and Cieszyn (1384–1480); full inheritance with Żagań (1480–1488)	Oleśnica (1312–1492)	Żagań (1309–1504)		Legnica (1st creation) (1241–1449)		Świdnica-Jawor (1274–1392)	Ziębice (1312–1442)	Opole (1282–1521)	Bytom (1282–1357)	Annexed to Bohemia; Recovered by Opole (1521)	Cieszyn (1281–1653)	Oświęcim (1315–1457) and Zator (1445–1513)
Annexed to Bohemia	Shared inheritance of Żagań (1349–1480), with Świdnica-Jawor (1349–1368), Bohemia (1368–1384) and Cieszyn (1384–1480); full inheritance with Żagań (1480–1488)	Oleśnica (1312–1492)		Lubin (1342–1550)		Brzeg (1st creation) (1342–1450)	Świdnica-Jawor (1274–1392)	Ziębice (1312–1442)	Opole (1282–1521)	Shared inheritance of Oleśnica (1357–1498) with Cieszyn (1357–1459); Full inheritance with Oleśnica (1459–1498); Recovered by Opole	Annexed to Bohemia; Recovered by Opole (1521)	Cieszyn (1281–1653)	Oświęcim (1315–1457) and Zator (1445–1513)
Annexed to Bohemia	Shared inheritance of Żagań (1349–1480), with Świdnica-Jawor (1349–1368), Bohemia (1368–1384) and Cieszyn (1384–1480); full inheritance with Żagań (1480–1488)	Oleśnica (1312–1492)		Lubin (1342–1550)		Brzeg (1st creation) (1342–1450)	Annexed to Bohemia	Ziębice (1312–1442)	Opole (1282–1521)	Shared inheritance of Oleśnica (1357–1498) with Cieszyn (1357–1459); Full inheritance with Oleśnica (1459–1498); Recovered by Opole	Annexed to Bohemia; Recovered by Opole (1521)	Cieszyn (1281–1653)	Oświęcim (1315–1457) and Zator (1445–1513)
Annexed to Bohemia	Shared inheritance of Żagań (1349–1480), with Świdnica-Jawor (1349–1368), Bohemia (1368–1384) and Cieszyn (1384–1480); full inheritance with Żagań (1480–1488)	Oleśnica (1312–1492)		Lubin (1342–1550)	Annexed to Bohemia	Annexed to Opole	Annexed to Bohemia	Annexed to Bohemia	Opole (1282–1521)	Shared inheritance of Oleśnica (1357–1498) with Cieszyn (1357–1459); Full inheritance with Oleśnica (1459–1498); Recovered by Opole	Annexed to Bohemia; Recovered by Opole (1521)	Cieszyn (1281–1653)	Oświęcim (1315–1457) and Zator (1445–1513)
Annexed to Bohemia	Annexed to Poland (1488)	Oleśnica (1312–1492)		Lubin (1342–1550)			Annexed to Bohemia	Annexed to Bohemia	Opole (1282–1521)	Shared inheritance of Oleśnica (1357–1498) with Cieszyn (1357–1459); Full inheritance with Oleśnica (1459–1498); Recovered by Opole	Annexed to Bohemia; Recovered by Opole (1521)	Cieszyn (1281–1653)	Oświęcim (1315–1457) and Zator (1445–1513)
Annexed to Bohemia	Annexed to Poland (1488)	Annexed to Bohemia		Legnica (2nd creation) (1454–1672)		Brzeg (2nd creation) (1488–1672)	Annexed to Bohemia	Annexed to Bohemia			Annexed to Bohemia; Recovered by Opole (1521)	Cieszyn (1281–1653)	Oświęcim (1315–1457) and Zator (1445–1513)
Annexed to Bohemia	Annexed to Poland (1488)	Annexed to Bohemia	Annexed to Saxony	Legnica (2nd creation) (1454–1672)		Brzeg (2nd creation) (1488–1672)	Annexed to Bohemia	Annexed to Bohemia	Opole-Racibórz (Upper Silesia) (2nd creation) (1521–1532)			Cieszyn (1281–1653)	Annexed to Poland
Annexed to Bohemia	Annexed to Poland (1488)	Annexed to Bohemia	Annexed to Saxony	Legnica (2nd creation) (1454–1672)		Brzeg (2nd creation) (1488–1672)	Annexed to Bohemia	Annexed to Bohemia	Annexed to Ansbach			Cieszyn (1281–1653)	Annexed to Poland
Annexed to Bohemia	Annexed to Poland (1488)	Annexed to Bohemia	Annexed to Saxony	Annexed to the Holy Roman Empire			Annexed to Bohemia	Annexed to Bohemia	Annexed to Ansbach			Annexed to the Holy Roman Empire	Annexed to Poland

A quick reminder, avoiding confusion:

Lower Silesia
- Duchy of Wrocław
- Duchy of Legnica
- Duchy of Głogów
- Duchy of Świdnica-Jawor
- Duchy of Wrocław
- Duchy of Oleśnica
Upper Silesia
- Duchy of Opole-Racibórz (divided after 1282)
- Duchy of Cieszyn
- Duchy of Bytom
- Duchy of Oświęcim
- Duchy of Zator

==== Table of rulers ====
Ruler	Born	Reign	Ruling part	Consort	Death	Notes
Władysław II the Exile	1105; Son of Bolesław III Wrymouth and Zbyslava of Kiev	28 October 1138 – 1146	Duchy of Silesia	Agnes of Babenberg; 1125 five children	30 May 1159 aged 53–54	Also monarch of Poland. Exiled by his half-brothers.
Bolesław IV the Curly	1122; Son of Bolesław III Wrymouth and Salomea of Berg	1146–1163	Duchy of Silesia	Viacheslava of Novgorod; 1137 three children Maria (wife of Bolesław IV the Curly) c. 1170 no children	5 January 1173 aged 50–51	Also Duke of Masovia and monarch of Poland.
Bolesław I the Tall	1127; First son of Władysław II the Exile and Agnes of Babenberg	1163 – 8 December 1201	Duchy of Wrocław (Lower Silesia)	Zvenislava Vsevolodovna of Kyiv; 1142 two children Christina; 1157 seven children	8 December 1201; Wrocław aged 73–74	Children of Władysław II the Exile, divided their inheritance in Silesia.
Mieszko IV Tanglefoot	1130; Second son of Władysław II the Exile and Agnes of Babenberg	1163 – 6 May 1211	Duchy of Opole and Racibórz (Upper Silesia)	Ludmila (wife of Mieszko I Tanglefoot) c. 1175 five children	6 May 1211 aged 80–81	Children of Władysław II the Exile, divided their inheritance in Silesia.
Henry I the Bearded	1165; Głogów; Son of Bolesław I the Tall and Christina	8 December 1201 – 19 March 1238	Duchy of Wrocław (Lower Silesia)	Hedwig of Andechs; 1188 seven children	19 March 1238; Krosno Odrzańskie aged 72–73	Also monarch of Poland.
Casimir I of Opole	1179; Son of Mieszko IV Tanglefoot and Ludmila (wife of Mieszko I Tanglefoot)	6 May 1211 – 13 May 1230	Duchy of Opole and Racibórz (Upper Silesia)	Viola, Duchess of Opole c. 1215 four children	13 May 1230 aged 50–51	
Regencies of Viola, Duchess of Opole (1230–1233), Henry I the Bearded (1233–1238) and Henry II the Pious (1238–1239)						
Mieszko II the Fat	1220; First son of Casimir I of Opole and Viola, Duchess of Opole	13 May 1230 – 22 October 1246	Duchy of Opole and Racibórz (Upper Silesia)	Judith of Masovia c.1240 no children	22 October 1246 aged 25–26	
Hedwig of Andechs	1174; Andechs; Son of Bolesław I the Tall and Christina	19 March 1238 – 15 October 1243	Duchy of Wrocław (at Niemcza)	Henry I the Bearded; 1188 seven children	15 October 1243; Trzebnica Abbey aged 68–69	Heirs of Henry I. His widow kept a seat at the town of Niemcza, while his son inherited the main duchy and was also monarch of Poland.
Henry II the Pious	1196; Son of Henry I the Bearded and Hedwig of Andechs	19 March 1238 – 9 April 1241	Duchy of Wrocław (Lower Silesia)	Anne of Bohemia, Duchess of Silesia; 1216 ten children	9 April 1241; Legnickie Pole aged 44–45	Heirs of Henry I. His widow kept a seat at the town of Niemcza, while his son inherited the main duchy and was also monarch of Poland.
Regency of Anne of Bohemia, Duchess of Silesia (1241–1242)						Children of Henry II, ruled initially under the regency of their mother, and jointly until 1248, when they made official the division of their inheritance.
Bolesław II the Bald	1220; First son of Henry II the Pious and Anne of Bohemia, Duchess of Silesia	9 April 1241 – 31 December 1278	Duchy of Legnica	Hedwig of Anhalt; 1242 seven children Euphemia of Pomerelia; 1261 (annulled 1277) no children Sophia of Dyhrn; 1277 (morganatic) no children	31 December 1278; Legnica aged 57–58	Children of Henry II, ruled initially under the regency of their mother, and jointly until 1248, when they made official the division of their inheritance.
Henry III the White	1222; Third son of Henry II the Pious and Anne of Bohemia, Duchess of Silesia	9 April 1241 – 3 December 1266	Duchy of Wrocław	Judith of Masovia; 2 June 1252 two children Helena of Saxony c.1255/60? no children	3 December 1266 aged 43–44	Children of Henry II, ruled initially under the regency of their mother, and jointly until 1248, when they made official the division of their inheritance.
Konrad I, Duke of Głogów	1228; Fourth son of Henry II the Pious and Anne of Bohemia, Duchess of Silesia	9 April 1241 – 6 August 1274	Duchy of Głogów	Salome of Greater Poland; 1249 six children Sophie of Landsberg; 1271 no children	6 August 1274; Głogów aged 45–46	Children of Henry II, ruled initially under the regency of their mother, and jointly until 1248, when they made official the division of their inheritance.
Vladislaus I of Opole	1225; Second son of Casimir I of Opole and Viola, Duchess of Opole	22 October 1246 – 13 September 1282	Duchy of Opole and Racibórz (Upper Silesia)	Euphemia of Greater Poland; 1251 five children	13 September 1282; Racibórz aged 56–57	In 1282, Opole-Racibórz was divided into various duchies, to the four sons of Władysław.
Henry Probus	1257; Son of Henry III the White and Judith of Masovia	3 December 1266 – 23 June 1290	Duchy of Wrocław	Constance of Opole; March 1280 no children Matilda of Brandenburg, Duchess of Poland c. 1288 no children	23 June 1290; Wrocław aged 32–33	Also monarch of Poland. Left no descendants, and his portion reverted to his cousin from Legnica.
Wroclaw temporarily annexed to Legnica
Henry III, Duke of Głogów	1251; First son of Konrad I, Duke of Głogów and Salome of Greater Poland	6 August 1274 – 9 December 1309	Duchy of Głogów	Matilda of Brunswick-Lüneburg; March 1291 nine children	9 December 1309 aged 57–58	Children of Konrad I divided their inheritance. In 1284, the younger brothers exchanged properties, but, as neither left descendants, both were reunited with the main duchy of Głogów.
Konrad II the Hunchback	1252; Second son of Konrad I, Duke of Głogów and Salome of Greater Poland	6 August 1274 – 11 October 1304	Duchy of Głogów (at Ścinawa until 1284; in Żagań since 1284)	Unmarried	11 October 1304 aged 51–52	Children of Konrad I divided their inheritance. In 1284, the younger brothers exchanged properties, but, as neither left descendants, both were reunited with the main duchy of Głogów.
Przemko of Ścinawa	1255; Third son of Konrad I, Duke of Głogów and Salome of Greater Poland	6 August 1274 – 26 February 1289	Duchy of Głogów (at Żagań; in Ścinawa since 1284)	Unmarried	26 February 1289 aged 33–34	Children of Konrad I divided their inheritance. In 1284, the younger brothers exchanged properties, but, as neither left descendants, both were reunited with the main duchy of Głogów.
Żagań and Scinawa remerged in Glogow
Henry V the Fat	1248; First son of Bolesław II the Bald and Hedwig of Anhalt	31 December 1278 – 22 February 1296	Duchy of Legnica	Elisabeth of Greater Poland; 1277 eight children	22 February 1296 aged 47–48	Children of Boleslaus II, divided their inheritance. In 1290, after the death of his childless cousin Henry IV, Henry V also inherited Wrocław. In 1296, after Henry V's death, Bolko was appointed regent for his nephews.
Bolko I the Strict	1252; Second son of Bolesław II the Bald and Hedwig of Anhalt	31 December 1278 – 9 November 1301	Duchy of Świdnica-Jawor	Beatrice of Brandenburg; 4 October 1284; Berlin ten children	9 November 1301; Legnica aged 48–49	Children of Boleslaus II, divided their inheritance. In 1290, after the death of his childless cousin Henry IV, Henry V also inherited Wrocław. In 1296, after Henry V's death, Bolko was appointed regent for his nephews.
Bernard the Lightsome	1253; Third son of Bolesław II the Bald and Hedwig of Anhalt	31 December 1278 – 25 April 1286	Duchy of Świdnica-Jawor (at Lwówek Śląski)	Unmarried	25 April 1286 aged 32–33	Children of Boleslaus II, divided their inheritance. In 1290, after the death of his childless cousin Henry IV, Henry V also inherited Wrocław. In 1296, after Henry V's death, Bolko was appointed regent for his nephews.
Lwówek annexed to Świdnica-Jawor
Mieszko I, Duke of Cieszyn	1252; First son of Vladislaus I of Opole and Euphemia of Greater Poland	13 September 1282 – 27 June 1315	Duchy of Cieszyn	Grimislava Vsevolodovna of Belz (?) between 1275 and 1280 three children	27 June 1315 aged 62–63	Children of Vladislaus I, divided their inheritance.
Casimir of Bytom	1253; Second son of Vladislaus I of Opole and Euphemia of Greater Poland	13 September 1282 – 10 March 1312	Duchy of Bytom	Helena Lvovna of Halych-Volhynia (?) c.1275 six children	10 March 1312 aged 58–59	Children of Vladislaus I, divided their inheritance.
Bolko I of Opole	October 1258; Third son of Vladislaus I of Opole and Euphemia of Greater Poland	13 September 1282 – 13 May 1313	Duchy of Opole	Agnes (of Brandenburg?) c. 1280 three children	14 May 1313 aged 54	Children of Vladislaus I, divided their inheritance.
Przemysław of Racibórz	12 June 1268; Fourth son of Vladislaus I of Opole and Euphemia of Greater Poland	13 September 1282 – 7 May 1306	Duchy of Racibórz	Anna of Masovia, Duchess of Racibórz c. 1290 three children	7 May 1306 aged 37	Children of Vladislaus I, divided their inheritance.
Regencies of Bolko I the Strict (1296–1301), Henry of Wierzbna (1301–1302) and Wenceslaus II of Bohemia (1302–1305)						Children of Henry V, ruled under regency until 1305, and divided their inheritance. Boleslaus received Legnica together with Ladislaus. Shortly after, Ladislaus was excluded from government. In 1342, abdicated the majority of the duchy to his sons, and ruled in Brzeg, which he left to his widow. Henry received Wrocław, but, having no male heirs, signed, in 1327, a contract of inheritance with King John of Bohemia and upon his death Wrocław fell to Bohemia.
Bolesław III the Generous	23 September 1291; First son of Henry V the Fat and Elisabeth of Greater Poland	22 February 1296 – 21 April 1352	Duchy of Legnica (only in the Duchy of Brzeg since 1342)	Margaret of Bohemia, Duchess of Wrocław; 1318 three children Katarina Šubić; 1326 no children	21 April 1352; Brzeg aged 60	Children of Henry V, ruled under regency until 1305, and divided their inheritance. Boleslaus received Legnica together with Ladislaus. Shortly after, Ladislaus was excluded from government. In 1342, abdicated the majority of the duchy to his sons, and ruled in Brzeg, which he left to his widow. Henry received Wrocław, but, having no male heirs, signed, in 1327, a contract of inheritance with King John of Bohemia and upon his death Wrocław fell to Bohemia.
Władysław of Legnica	6 June 1296; Third son of Henry V the Fat and Elisabeth of Greater Poland	22 February 1296 – 1312	Duchy of Legnica	Anna of Masovia; 1325 (annulled 1329) no children	January 1352 aged 55	Children of Henry V, ruled under regency until 1305, and divided their inheritance. Boleslaus received Legnica together with Ladislaus. Shortly after, Ladislaus was excluded from government. In 1342, abdicated the majority of the duchy to his sons, and ruled in Brzeg, which he left to his widow. Henry received Wrocław, but, having no male heirs, signed, in 1327, a contract of inheritance with King John of Bohemia and upon his death Wrocław fell to Bohemia.
Henry VI the Good	18 March 1294; Second son of Henry V the Fat and Elisabeth of Greater Poland	22 February 1296 – 24 November 1335	Duchy of Wrocław	Anne of Austria, Margravine of Brandenburg; 1310 three children	24 November 1335; Wrocław aged 41	Children of Henry V, ruled under regency until 1305, and divided their inheritance. Boleslaus received Legnica together with Ladislaus. Shortly after, Ladislaus was excluded from government. In 1342, abdicated the majority of the duchy to his sons, and ruled in Brzeg, which he left to his widow. Henry received Wrocław, but, having no male heirs, signed, in 1327, a contract of inheritance with King John of Bohemia and upon his death Wrocław fell to Bohemia.
Wrocław annexed to the Kingdom of Bohemia
Regency of Herman, Margrave of Brandenburg-Salzwedel (1301–1305)						Children of Bolko/Boleslaus I the Strict, divided their inheritance. Bolko was under his elder brother's tutelage until his majority, attained in 1322. Henry annexed Głogów in 1337, which he recovered from Bohemia. However, after Henry's death, Głogów returns to Bohemian control; Jawor also returns to Świdnica.
Bernard of Świdnica	1291; First son of Bolko I the Strict and Beatrice of Brandenburg	9 November 1301 – 6 May 1326	Duchy of Świdnica-Jawor (in Świdnica)	Kunigunde of Poland; 1310 five children	6 May 1326 aged 34–35	Children of Bolko/Boleslaus I the Strict, divided their inheritance. Bolko was under his elder brother's tutelage until his majority, attained in 1322. Henry annexed Głogów in 1337, which he recovered from Bohemia. However, after Henry's death, Głogów returns to Bohemian control; Jawor also returns to Świdnica.
Henry I of Jawor	1292; Second son of Bolko I the Strict and Beatrice of Brandenburg	9 November 1301 – 15 May 1346	Duchy of Świdnica-Jawor (in Jawor and Duchy of Głogów since 1337)	Agnes of Bohemia, Duchess of Jawor; 1316 no children	15 May 1346 aged 53–54	Children of Bolko/Boleslaus I the Strict, divided their inheritance. Bolko was under his elder brother's tutelage until his majority, attained in 1322. Henry annexed Głogów in 1337, which he recovered from Bohemia. However, after Henry's death, Głogów returns to Bohemian control; Jawor also returns to Świdnica.
Bolko II of Ziębice	1 February 1300; Third son of Bolko I the Strict and Beatrice of Brandenburg	9 November 1301 – 11 June 1341	Duchy of Ziębice	Bonne-Judith of Savoy-Vaud; 21 November 1321 two children	11 June 1341; Ziębice aged 41	Children of Bolko/Boleslaus I the Strict, divided their inheritance. Bolko was under his elder brother's tutelage until his majority, attained in 1322. Henry annexed Głogów in 1337, which he recovered from Bohemia. However, after Henry's death, Głogów returns to Bohemian control; Jawor also returns to Świdnica.
Jawor was reincorporated in Świdnica
Głogów was re-annexed to Bohemia
Regency of Mieszko I, Duke of Cieszyn (1306–1308)						After his death without descendants in 1336, Raciborz was inherited by his sister.
Leszek of Racibórz	1292; Son of Przemysław of Racibórz and Anna of Masovia, Duchess of Racibórz	7 May 1306 – 1336	Duchy of Racibórz	Agnes of Głogów-Żagań; 1332 no children	1336 aged 43–44	After his death without descendants in 1336, Raciborz was inherited by his sister.
Matilda of Brunswick-Lüneburg	1276; Daughter of Albert I, Duke of Brunswick and Alexia of Montferrat	9 December 1309 – 26 April 1318	Duchy of Głogów	Henry III, Duke of Głogów; March 1291 nine children	26 April 1318 aged 41–42	Heirs of Henry III. The widow received the main part of the duchy (Głogów), while their sons divided their inheritance. Henry IV stayed with Przemko in Żagań, John received Scinawa, and Conrad and Boleslaus inherited Oleśnica jointly. In 1318, Przemko assumed his mother's inheritance at Głogów. After the childless death of Przemko II, it was stipulated that his widow should succeed him, but financial complications led to the duchy's temporary annexation by the Kingdom of Bohemia. After John's death, Scinawa was partitioned between Swidnica-Jawor and Żagań.
Henry IV the Faithful	1292; First son of Henry III, Duke of Głogów and Matilda of Brunswick-Lüneburg	9 December 1309 – 22 January 1342	Duchy of Żagań	Matilda of Brandenburg-Salzwedel; 5 January 1310 four children	22 January 1342; Żagań aged 49–50	
Konrad I of Oleśnica	1294; Second son of Henry III, Duke of Głogów and Matilda of Brunswick-Lüneburg	9 December 1309 – 22 December 1366	Duchy of Oleśnica (with Duchy of Bytom Half A, since 1357, jure uxoris)	Elisabeth of Wroclaw, Duchess of Oleśnica; 10 January 1322 no children Euphemia, Duchess of Bytom; 2 March 1333 two children	22 December 1366 aged 71–72	
Bolesław of Oleśnica	1295; Third son of Henry III, Duke of Głogów and Matilda of Brunswick-Lüneburg	9 December 1309 – April 1321	Duchy of Oleśnica (with Duchy of Bytom Half A, since 1357, jure uxoris)	Unmarried	April 1321 aged 25–26	
John of Ścinawa	1298; Fourth son of Henry III, Duke of Głogów and Matilda of Brunswick-Lüneburg	9 December 1309 – 19 May 1365	Duchy of Głogów (at Ścinawa)	Margaret of Pomerania-Wolgast; 14 January 1316 no children	19 May 1365 aged 66–67	
Przemko II of Glogów	1305; Fifth son of Henry III, Duke of Głogów and Matilda of Brunswick-Lüneburg	26 April 1318 – 11 January 1331	Duchy of Głogów (at Duchy of Żagań in 1309–1318)	Constance of Świdnica; 1326 no children	11 January 1331 aged 25–26	
Głogów was annexed to the Kingdom of Bohemia (1331–1337) and to the Jawor portion of Świdnica-Jawor (1337–1346); a new annexation followed, to the Kingdom of Bohemia (1346–1349/1360). In 1349, Henry V the Iron (son of Henry the Fat) recovered half of the inheritance of his uncle Przemko in Głogów from Bohemia; the other half was given to Przemko II's widow, Constance, in 1360, passed to her brother Bolko II the Small, and passed briefly to Bohemia before being annexed to Cieszyn.
Scinawa was divided in 1365; half of it was inherited by Żagań and in 1395 sold to Oleśnica; the other part was inherited by Świdnica, and passed briefly to Bohemia before being annexed to Cieszyn.
Władysław of Bytom	1277; Second son of Casimir of Bytom and Helena Lvovna of Halych-Volhynia (?)	10 March 1312 – 8 September 1352	Duchy of Bytom (in Koźle until 1316; at Bytom proper since 1316)	Beatrice of Brandenburg; 21 September 1308 two children Ludgarda of Mecklenburg; 6 October 1328 six children	8 September 1352 age 74–75	Children of Casimir, divided their inheritance. In 1316, Siemowit, the middle brother, exchanged the main duchy with the eldest and took a smaller town for himself.
George of Bytom	1300; Fourth son of Casimir of Bytom and Helena Lvovna of Halych-Volhynia (?)	10 March 1312 – 1327	Duchy of Bytom (in Koźle until 1316; at Bytom proper since 1316)	Unmarried	1327 age 26–27	Children of Casimir, divided their inheritance. In 1316, Siemowit, the middle brother, exchanged the main duchy with the eldest and took a smaller town for himself.
Siemowit of Bytom	1292; Third son of Casimir of Bytom and Helena Lvovna of Halych-Volhynia (?)	10 March 1312 – July 1342	Duchy of Bytom (in Bytom proper until 1316; at Gliwice since 1316)	Unmarried	July 1342 age 49–50	Children of Casimir, divided their inheritance. In 1316, Siemowit, the middle brother, exchanged the main duchy with the eldest and took a smaller town for himself.
Gliwice and Kozle returned to Bytom
Bolesław the Elder	1293; First son of Bolko I of Opole and Agnes	13 May 1313 – 21 June 1356	Duchy of Opole (at Niemodlin)	Euphemia of Wrocław; 29 October 1325 eight childrend	21 March 1365 aged 71–72	Children of Bolko I, divided their inheritance.
Bolko II of Opole	c. 1295? Second son of Bolko I of Opole and Agnes	13 May 1313 – 21 June 1356	Duchy of Opole	Elisabeth of Świdnica; 6 May 1326 seven children Margaret (?) one child	21 June 1356 aged 60–61?	Children of Bolko I, divided their inheritance.
Albert of Strzelce	c. 1305? Third son of Bolko I of Opole and Agnes	13 May 1313 – 25 September 1375	Duchy of Opole (at Strzelce)	Agnes of Hardegg; 1347 one child	25 September 1375 aged 69–70?	Children of Bolko I, divided their inheritance.
Ladislaus I	1275; First son of Mieszko I, Duke of Cieszyn and Grimislava Vsevolodovna of Belz (?)	27 June 1315 – 15 May 1324	Duchy of Oświęcim	Euphrosyne of Masovia; 1304 two children	15 May 1324 aged 48–49	Children of Mieszko I, divided their inheritance.
Casimir I, Duke of Cieszyn	1280; Second son of Mieszko I, Duke of Cieszyn and Grimislava Vsevolodovna of Belz (?)	27 June 1315 – 29 September 1358	Duchy of Cieszyn	Euphemia of Masovia; 1321 nine children	29 September 1358 aged 77–78	Children of Mieszko I, divided their inheritance.
Regency of Euphrosyne of Masovia (1324–1325)						
Jan I the Scholastic	1308; Son of Władysław of Oświęcim and Euphrosyne of Masovia	15 May 1324 – September 1372	Duchy of Oświęcim	Unknown one child Salomea Reuss of Plauen; July 1359 three children	September 1372 aged 63–64	
Bolko II the Small	1312; First son of Bernard of Świdnica and Kunigunde of Poland	6 May 1326 – 28 July 1368	Duchy of Świdnica-Jawor (in Świdnica; at Jawor since 1346; in Duchy of Brzeg Half B since 1358, and Duchy of Głogów Half B since 1361)	Agnes of Austria; 1 June 1338 no children	28 July 1368; Świdnica aged 55–56	Sons of Bernard II, ruled jointly until Henry's death in 1343. In 1346, after his uncle Henry I's death with no male heirs, he reunites Świdnica-Jawor in one duchy. Bolko also bought half of Brzeg in 1358. Brother of Constance, widow duchess of Głogów, inherited part of the duchy from her. After his death in 1368, the half of Głogów returned the Kingdom of Bohemia, and the half of Brzeg to Louis I of Brzeg.
Henry II of Świdnica	1316; Second son of Bernard of Świdnica and Kunigunde of Poland	6 May 1326 – 28 June 1345	Duchy of Świdnica-Jawor (in Świdnica)	Catherine of Hungary, Duchess of Świdnica; 1 June 1338 one child	28 June 1345; Kamienna Góra aged 28–29	Sons of Bernard II, ruled jointly until Henry's death in 1343. In 1346, after his uncle Henry I's death with no male heirs, he reunites Świdnica-Jawor in one duchy. Bolko also bought half of Brzeg in 1358. Brother of Constance, widow duchess of Głogów, inherited part of the duchy from her. After his death in 1368, the half of Głogów returned the Kingdom of Bohemia, and the half of Brzeg to Louis I of Brzeg.
Annexation of Half B of Głogów to the Kingdom of Bohemia (1368–1384)
Half A annexed to Lubin
Anna of Racibórz	1298; Daughter of Premislaus and Anna of Masovia, Duchess of Racibórz	1336 – 21 August 1340	Duchy of Racibórz	Nicholas II, Duke of Opava; 1318 six children	21 August 1340 aged 41–42	Her husband claimed the duchy, and she managed to inherit it.
Racibórz annexed to the Duchy of Opava (1306–1521)
Nicholas the Small	1327; Son of Bolko II of Ziębice and Bonne-Judith of Savoy-Vaud	11 June 1341 – 23 April 1358	Duchy of Ziębice	Agnes of Lichtenburk; 23 October 1343 six children	23 April 1358 in Hungary aged 30–31	
Henry V the Iron	1319; Son of Henry IV the Faithful and Matilda of Brandenburg-Salzwedel	22 January 1342 – 13 April 1369	Duchy of Żagań (with Duchy of Głogów Half A since 1349)	Anna of Płock; 6 September 1337 five children	13 April 1369 aged 49–50	Children of Henry IV divided their inheritance. In 1349, Henry V annexed half of the previous Duchy of Głogów reemerges from Bohemia to be annexed by the Żagań Line of the Piasts. As for Agnes, she "legitimised" the pledge of Lubin that her uncle John, Duke of Ścinawa had made in 1337 with Bolesław III the Generous, by marrying (secondly) Bolesław's son. In this perspective, she can be considered the heiress of Lubin.
Agnes	1321; Daughter of Henry IV the Faithful and Matilda of Brandenburg-Salzwedel	22 January 1342 – 7 July 1362	Duchy of Lubin	Leszek of Racibórz; 1332 no children Louis I of Brzeg; 18 November 1341 six children	7 July 1362 aged 40–41	Children of Henry IV divided their inheritance. In 1349, Henry V annexed half of the previous Duchy of Głogów reemerges from Bohemia to be annexed by the Żagań Line of the Piasts. As for Agnes, she "legitimised" the pledge of Lubin that her uncle John, Duke of Ścinawa had made in 1337 with Bolesław III the Generous, by marrying (secondly) Bolesław's son. In this perspective, she can be considered the heiress of Lubin.
Wenceslaus I of Legnica	1318; First son of Bolesław III the Generous and Margaret of Bohemia, Duchess of Wroclaw	1342 – 2 June 1364	Duchy of Legnica	Anna of Cieszyn; 1338 five children	2 June 1364 aged 45–46	Sons of Boleslaus III, divided their inheritance during their father's life. Louis was already ruling in Lubin, while Wenceslaus did the same in Legnica. In 1358, Louis inherited half of Brzeg from his stepmother, Catharina (see below). Reunited Brzeg after the death of the owner of the other part, Bolko the Small (1368).
Louis I of Brzeg	1321; Second son of Bolesław III the Generous and Margaret of Bohemia, Duchess of Wroclaw	22 January 1342 – 23 December 1398	Duchy of Lubin (jure uxoris; with Duchy of Brzeg Half A since 1358; in the whole duchy since 1368)	Agnes; 18 November 1341 six children	23 December 1398 aged 76–77	Sons of Boleslaus III, divided their inheritance during their father's life. Louis was already ruling in Lubin, while Wenceslaus did the same in Legnica. In 1358, Louis inherited half of Brzeg from his stepmother, Catharina (see below). Reunited Brzeg after the death of the owner of the other part, Bolko the Small (1368).
Katarina Šubić	c.1310? Daughter of Mladen III Šubić and Jelena Nemanjić	21 April 1352 – February 1358	Duchy of Brzeg	Bolesław III the Generous; 1326 no children	February 1358; Brzeg aged 47–48?	Inherited Brzeg from her husband. After her death, the duchy was divided between Louis I of Brzeg (her stepson) and Bolko II the Small from Swidnica-Jawor.
Brzeg divided between Lubin and Swidnica-Jawor
Bolesław of Bytom	1330; Son of Władysław of Bytom and Ludgarda of Mecklenburg, Duchess of Bytom	8 September 1352 – 4 October 1355	Duchy of Bytom	14 February 1347 three children	4 October 1355 aged 24–25	Son of Ladislaus, Boleslaus left his duchy to his widow Margareta after his death. In 1357, after two years of war for the duchy, a settlement was made; Margareta abdicated the duchy, which was split between its heiresses.
Margareta of Sternberg	c.1330 Daughter of Jaroslav of Sternberg and Margareta of Bílina	4 October 1355 – 8 December 1357	Duchy of Bytom	14 February 1347 three children	June 1365 aged 34–35	Son of Ladislaus, Boleslaus left his duchy to his widow Margareta after his death. In 1357, after two years of war for the duchy, a settlement was made; Margareta abdicated the duchy, which was split between its heiresses.
Vladislaus II of Opole	1332; First son of Bolko II of Opole and Elisabeth of Świdnica	21 June 1356 – 18 May 1401 (only de jure from 1396)	Duchy of Opole	Elisabeth of Wallachia c. 1355 three children Euphemia of Masovia; 1369 two children	18 May 1401; Opole aged 68–69	Children of Bolko II, ruled jointly. In 1375, Bolko III was Albert of Strzelce's heir and split Strzelce from Opole again, leaving the main duchy for his elder brother Ladislaus.
Henry	August? 1338; Third son of Bolko II of Opole and Elisabeth of Świdnica	21 June 1356 – October 1365	Duchy of Opole	Unmarried	October 1365 aged 27?	Children of Bolko II, ruled jointly. In 1375, Bolko III was Albert of Strzelce's heir and split Strzelce from Opole again, leaving the main duchy for his elder brother Ladislaus.
Bolko III of Strzelce	1337; Second son of Bolko II of Opole and Elisabeth of Świdnica	21 June 1356 – 21 October 1382	Duchy of Opole (at Strzelce since 1375)	Anna of Oświęcim c. 1355 five children	21 October 1382 aged 44–45	Children of Bolko II, ruled jointly. In 1375, Bolko III was Albert of Strzelce's heir and split Strzelce from Opole again, leaving the main duchy for his elder brother Ladislaus.
Euphemia (I)	c. 1310; Daughter of Władysław of Bytom and Beatrice of Brandenburg	8 December 1357 – 3 January 1378	Duchy of Bytom (half A)	Konrad I of Oleśnica; 2 March 1333 two children	3 January 1378 aged 67–68	In 1357, the duchy was divided between heiresses, one annexed by the Duchy of Oleśnica, the other annexed by the Duchy of Cieszyn, and a third part, ruled by the duke of Niemodlin jure uxoris was also annexed to Oleśnica.
Elisabeth	1347; First daughter of Bolesław of Bytom and Margareta of Sternberg	8 December 1357 – 1374	Duchy of Bytom (half B)	Przemyslaus I Noszak, Duke of Cieszyn; 1360 three children	1374 aged 26–27	In 1357, the duchy was divided between heiresses, one annexed by the Duchy of Oleśnica, the other annexed by the Duchy of Cieszyn, and a third part, ruled by the duke of Niemodlin jure uxoris was also annexed to Oleśnica.
Euphemia (II)	c.1350 Second daughter of Bolesław of Bytom and Margareta of Sternberg	8 December 1357 – 26 August 1411	Duchy of Bytom (at Gliwice)	Wenceslaus of Niemodlin; 1364 no children Bolko III of Ziębice; 1369 eight children	26 August 1411 aged 60–61	In 1357, the duchy was divided between heiresses, one annexed by the Duchy of Oleśnica, the other annexed by the Duchy of Cieszyn, and a third part, ruled by the duke of Niemodlin jure uxoris was also annexed to Oleśnica.
Bytom divided between the duchies of Oleśnica and Cieszyn
Regency of Agnes of Lichtenburk (1358–1360)						Children of Nicholas I, ruled jointly.
Bolko III of Ziębice	1348; Ziębice; First son of Nicholas the Small and Agnes of Lichtenburk	23 April 1358 – 13 June 1410	Duchy of Ziębice	Euphemia of Bytom, Duchess of Gliwice; 1369 eight children	13 June 1410; Ziębice aged 61–62	Children of Nicholas I, ruled jointly.
Henry I of Ziębice	1350; Ziębice; Second son of Nicholas the Small and Agnes of Lichtenburk	23 April 1358 – August 1366	Duchy of Ziębice	Unmarried	August 1366; Ziębice aged 15–16	Children of Nicholas I, ruled jointly.
Przemyslaus I Noszak, Duke of Cieszyn	13 February 1334; Cieszyn; Son of Casimir I, Duke of Cieszyn and Euphemia of Masovia, Duchess of Cieszyn	29 September 1358 – 23 May 1410	Duchy of Cieszyn (with Duchy of Bytom Half B since 1359, jure uxoris, and Duchy of Głogów Half B in 1384–1404 and 1406–1410)	Elisabeth, Duchess of Bytom; 1360 three children	23 May 1410; Cieszyn aged 76	In 1384 recovered part of the Lower Silesian duchy of Głogów from Bohemia. Abdicated the Głogów for his son, Premislaus, in 1404, but recovered it in 1406.
Constance of Świdnica	1313; Daughter of Bernard of Świdnica and Kunigunde of Poland	1360–1361	Duchy of Głogów (Half B)	Przemko II of Glogów; 1326 no children	21 November 1363 aged 49–50	In 1360 Half B of Głogów reemerges as Constance, widow of Przemko II; recovers half of the dowry that was left by her husband; however, she quickly gives it to her brother, Bolko II the Small.
Half B of Głogów was annexed to Swidnica-Jawor, then, in 1368, to Bohemia, and, in 1384, it was bought by the Duchy of Cieszyn.
Rupert I of Legnica	27 March 1347; First son of Wenceslaus I of Legnica and Anna of Cieszyn	2 June 1364 – 12 January 1409	Duchy of Legnica	Hedwig of Żagań; 10 February 1372 two children	12 January 1409 aged 61	Sons of Wenceslaus I, ruled jointly. Wenceslaus II was also Duke of Nysa as Bishop of Wrocław, and abdicated in 1413.
Wenceslaus II of Liegnitz	1348; Second son of Wenceslaus I of Legnica and Anna of Cieszyn	2 June 1364 – 16 March 1413	Duchy of Legnica	Unmarried	30 December 1419; Otmuchów aged 61	Sons of Wenceslaus I, ruled jointly. Wenceslaus II was also Duke of Nysa as Bishop of Wrocław, and abdicated in 1413.
Bolesław IV of Legnica	1349; Third son of Wenceslaus I of Legnica and Anna of Cieszyn	2 June 1364 – 4 March 1394	Duchy of Legnica	Unmarried	4 March 1394 aged 61	Sons of Wenceslaus I, ruled jointly. Wenceslaus II was also Duke of Nysa as Bishop of Wrocław, and abdicated in 1413.
Henry VIII of Legnica	1355; Fourth son of Wenceslaus I of Legnica and Anna of Cieszyn	2 June 1364 – 12 December 1398	Duchy of Legnica	Unmarried	12 December 1398; Legnica aged 61	Sons of Wenceslaus I, ruled jointly. Wenceslaus II was also Duke of Nysa as Bishop of Wrocław, and abdicated in 1413.
Bolesław II of Niemodlin	1326; First son of Bolesław the Elder and Euphemia of Wrocław	21 March 1365 – 25 June 1368	Duchy of Opole (at Niemodlin)	Unmarried	25 June 1368 aged 41–42	Children of Boleslaus the Elder of Niemodlin, ruled jointly, and none left descendants.
Wenceslaus of Niemodlin	1336; Second son of Boleslaus I and Euphemia of Wrocław	21 March 1365 – June 1369	Duchy of Opole (at Niemodlin)	Euphemia of Bytom, Duchess of Gliwice; 1364 no children	June 1369 aged 32–33	Children of Boleslaus the Elder of Niemodlin, ruled jointly, and none left descendants.
Henry of Niemodlin	c. 1350; Third son of Bolesław the Elder and Euphemia of Wrocław	21 March 1365 – 14 September 1382	Duchy of Opole (at Niemodlin)	Catharina of Moravia c. 1370 no children	14 September 1382 aged 31–32	Children of Boleslaus the Elder of Niemodlin, ruled jointly, and none left descendants.
Niemodlin annexed to Strzelce
Konrad II the Gray	1340; Son of Konrad I of Oleśnica and Euphemia of Bytom	22 December 1366 – 10 June 1403	Duchy of Oleśnica (with Duchy of Bytom Half A	Agnes of Cieszyn; 23 February 1354 one child	10 June 1403; Trzebnica aged 62–63	
Agnes of Austria (1322–1392)	1322; Vienna; Daughter of Leopold I, Duke of Austria and Catherine of Savoy	28 July 1368 – 2 February 1392	Duchy of Świdnica-Jawor	Bolko II the Small; 1 June 1338 no children	2 February 1392; Świdnica aged 69–70	Widow, succeeded her husband according to his will. After her death, the duchy was annexed to the Kingdom of Bohemia.
Swidnica-Jawor annexed to the Kingdom of Bohemia
Henry VI the Elder	c. 1345; First son of Henry V the Iron and Anna of Płock	13 April 1369 – 5 December 1393	Duchy of Żagań	Hedwig of Legnica; 10 February 1372 no children	5 December 1393; Włoszczowa aged 47–48	Children of Henry V divided their inheritance. After his death, Henry VI left his property to his wife and Henry VIII eventually succeeded in Henry VII's domains.
Henry VII Rumpold	1350; Second son of Henry V the Iron and Anna of Płock	13 April 1369 – 24 December 1395	Duchy of Głogów (Half A)	Unmarried	24 December 1395; Bolesławiec aged 44–45	Children of Henry V divided their inheritance. After his death, Henry VI left his property to his wife and Henry VIII eventually succeeded in Henry VII's domains.
Henry VIII the Sparrow	1357; Third son of Henry V the Iron and Anna of Płock	13 April 1369 – 14 March 1397	Duchy of Głogów (at Zielona Góra, Przemków and Szprotawa; in the whole Half A since 1395)	Catherine of Opole; 1382 five children	14 March 1397; Szprotawa aged 39–40	Children of Henry V divided their inheritance. After his death, Henry VI left his property to his wife and Henry VIII eventually succeeded in Henry VII's domains.
Jan II of Oświęcim	1344; Son of Jan I the Scholastic	September 1372 – 19 February 1376	Duchy of Oświęcim	Hedwig of Brzeg; 1366 three children	19 February 1376 aged 31–32	
Regency of Przemyslaus I Noszak, Duke of Cieszyn (1376 – c. 1380)						Left no descendants. The duchy went to a son of Premislaus I Noszak.
Jan III of Oświęcim	1366; Son of Jan II of Oświęcim and Hedwig of Brzeg	19 February 1376 – 19 August 1405	Duchy of Oświęcim	Hedwig of Lithuania; 1394 no children	19 August 1405 aged 38–39	Left no descendants. The duchy went to a son of Premislaus I Noszak.
Jan Kropidło	1360; First son of Bolko III of Strzelce and Anna of Oświęcim	21 October 1382 – 3 March 1421	Duchy of Opole (at Strzelce and Niemodlin until 1401; in Opole as regent since 1396; officially since 1401)	Unmarried	3 March 1421; Opole aged 60–61	Children of Bolko III, ruled first jointly, and after their uncle Ladislaus's resignation and death (1396–1401), they divided their whole inheritance.
Bolko IV of Opole	1363; Second son of Bolko III of Strzelce and Anna of Oświęcim	21 October 1382 – 6 May 1437	Duchy of Opole (at Strzelce and Niemodlin until 1401; in Opole as regent since 1396; officially since 1401)	Margaret of Gorizia; 1398 five children	6 May 1437 aged 73–74	Children of Bolko III, ruled first jointly, and after their uncle Ladislaus's resignation and death (1396–1401), they divided their whole inheritance.
Henry II of Niemodlin	1374; Third son of Bolko III of Strzelce and Anna of Oświęcim	21 October 1382 – 22 December 1394	Duchy of Opole (at Strzelce and Niemodlin)	Unmarried	22 December 1394 aged 19–20	Children of Bolko III, ruled first jointly, and after their uncle Ladislaus's resignation and death (1396–1401), they divided their whole inheritance.
Bernard of Niemodlin	1378; Fourth son of Bolko III of Strzelce and Anna of Oświęcim	21 October 1382 – 1450	Duchy of Opole (at Strzelce and Niemodlin)	Hedwig of Melsztyń two children	2/4 April 1455 aged 76–77	Children of Bolko III, ruled first jointly, and after their uncle Ladislaus's resignation and death (1396–1401), they divided their whole inheritance.
Hedwig of Legnica	1351; Daughter of Wenceslaus I, Duke of Legnica and Anna of Cieszyn	5 December 1393 – 1403	Duchy of Żagań	Henry VI the Elder; 10 February 1372 no children	1 August 1409; Legnica aged 57–58	Inherited the property of her husband (with whom she was apparently estranged with). In 1403, she abdicated her inheritance to her nephews, sons of her brother-in-law Henry VIII.
Catherine of Opole	16 March 1367; Daughter of Vladislaus II of Opole and Euphemia of Masovia	14 March 1397 – 6 June 1420	Duchy of Głogów (in Prudnik, Kożuchów and Zielona Góra)	Henry VIII the Sparrow; 1382 five children	6 June 1420 aged 53	Heirs of Henry VIII. Catharina remained at her dowry lands, while the rest of the property was divided, at least since 1403, when Hedwig of Legnica passed her own property to her nephews, who proceeded to a new partition of the whole inheritance. John inherited Żagań alone, while the rest of the brothers kept Głogów. With the abdication of Wenceslaus and the death of Henry X, Henry IX became sole ruler of Glogow, and in 1446, he bought Lubin.
Regency of Rupert I of Legnica (1397–1401)						Heirs of Henry VIII. Catharina remained at her dowry lands, while the rest of the property was divided, at least since 1403, when Hedwig of Legnica passed her own property to her nephews, who proceeded to a new partition of the whole inheritance. John inherited Żagań alone, while the rest of the brothers kept Głogów. With the abdication of Wenceslaus and the death of Henry X, Henry IX became sole ruler of Glogow, and in 1446, he bought Lubin.
Jan I of Żagań	1385; First son of Henry VIII the Sparrow and Catherine of Opole	14 March 1397 – 12 April 1439	Duchy of Żagań (in Duchy of Głogów Half A until 1412; in Żagań proper since 1403)	Scholastica of Saxe-Wittenberg; 1408 ten children	12 April 1439 aged 53–54	Heirs of Henry VIII. Catharina remained at her dowry lands, while the rest of the property was divided, at least since 1403, when Hedwig of Legnica passed her own property to her nephews, who proceeded to a new partition of the whole inheritance. John inherited Żagań alone, while the rest of the brothers kept Głogów. With the abdication of Wenceslaus and the death of Henry X, Henry IX became sole ruler of Glogow, and in 1446, he bought Lubin.
Henry IX the Elder	1387; Second son of Henry VIII the Sparrow and Catherine of Opole	14 March 1397 – 11 November 1467	Duchy of Głogów (Half A)	Hedwig of Oleśnica; 1432 six children	11 November 1467; Krosno Odrzańskie aged 79–80	Heirs of Henry VIII. Catharina remained at her dowry lands, while the rest of the property was divided, at least since 1403, when Hedwig of Legnica passed her own property to her nephews, who proceeded to a new partition of the whole inheritance. John inherited Żagań alone, while the rest of the brothers kept Głogów. With the abdication of Wenceslaus and the death of Henry X, Henry IX became sole ruler of Glogow, and in 1446, he bought Lubin.
Henry X Rumpold	1390; Third son of Henry VIII the Sparrow and Catherine of Opole	14 March 1397 – 18 January 1423	Duchy of Głogów (Half A)	Unmarried	18 January 1423; Flensburg aged 32–33	Heirs of Henry VIII. Catharina remained at her dowry lands, while the rest of the property was divided, at least since 1403, when Hedwig of Legnica passed her own property to her nephews, who proceeded to a new partition of the whole inheritance. John inherited Żagań alone, while the rest of the brothers kept Głogów. With the abdication of Wenceslaus and the death of Henry X, Henry IX became sole ruler of Glogow, and in 1446, he bought Lubin.
Wenceslaus of Krosno	1391; Fourth son of Henry VIII the Sparrow and Catherine of Opole	14 March 1397 – January 1431	Duchy of Głogów (at Krosno Odrzańskie, Świebodzin and Bytnica)	Unmarried	January 1431 aged 39–40	Heirs of Henry VIII. Catharina remained at her dowry lands, while the rest of the property was divided, at least since 1403, when Hedwig of Legnica passed her own property to her nephews, who proceeded to a new partition of the whole inheritance. John inherited Żagań alone, while the rest of the brothers kept Głogów. With the abdication of Wenceslaus and the death of Henry X, Henry IX became sole ruler of Glogow, and in 1446, he bought Lubin.
Krosno Odrzańskie, Świebodzin and Bytnica annexed to Głogów.
Henry VII of Brzeg	1343; Son of Louis I of Brzeg and Agnes	23 December 1398 – 11 July 1399	Duchy of Lubin (with Duchy of Brzeg)	Helena of Orlamünde; 1369 one child Margaret of Masovia; July 1379 two children	11 July 1399 aged 55–56	Co-ruled with his father since 1361.
Henry IX of Lubin	1369; Son of Henry VII of Brzeg and Helena of Orlamünde	11 July 1399 – 10 July 1420	Duchy of Lubin (with the whole Duchy of Brzeg until 1400; in Olawa since 1400)	Anna of Cieszyn; 20 September 1396 six children	10 July 1420 aged 50–51	Children of Henry VII divided their inheritance. Brzeg was exchanged between the brothers in 1400 (Henry gave it to Louis). However, Oława (in Brzeg) remained in Henry IX's possession. In 1413, Legnica was inherited by Louis II.
Louis II of Brieg	1380; Son of Henry VII of Brzeg and Margaret of Masovia	11 July 1399 – 30 May 1436	Duchy of Brzeg (in Chojnów; in Brzeg proper since 1400; with Duchy of Legnica since 1413)	Hedwig Zapólya before 14 August 1409 no children Elisabeth of Brandenburg, Duchess of Brzeg-Legnica and Cieszyn; 9 April 1418; Konstanz no children	30 May 1436 aged 55–56	Children of Henry VII divided their inheritance. Brzeg was exchanged between the brothers in 1400 (Henry gave it to Louis). However, Oława (in Brzeg) remained in Henry IX's possession. In 1413, Legnica was inherited by Louis II.
Euphemia of Masovia	1344; Daughter of Siemowit III, Duke of Masovia and Euphemia of Opava	18 May 1401 – 1424	Duchy of Opole (at Głogówek)	Vladislaus II of Opole; 1369 two children	1424 aged 79–80?	Widow of Vladislaus II, received a dower seat after her husband's death.
Głogówek remerged in Opole
Konrad III the Old	1359; Son of Konrad II the Gray and Agnes of Cieszyn	10 June 1403 – 28 December 1412	Duchy of Oleśnica (with Duchy of Bytom Half A)	Judith (d. 24 June 1416) c. 1380 seven children	28 December 1412 aged 52–53	
Przemysław of Oświęcim	1362; First son of Przemyslaus I Noszak, Duke of Cieszyn and Elisabeth of Bytom	19 August 1405 – 1 January 1406	Duchy of Oświęcim (in the Duchy of Głogów Half B in 1404–1406)	Unknown one child	1 January 1406 aged 43–44	Received, in his father's lifetime, the duchy of Głogów. In the next year, he also inherited Oświęcim from John III. Preceded his father in death, but left descendants to rule in Oświęcim, while Głogów returned to his father.
Regencies of Przemyslaus I Noszak, Duke of Cieszyn (1406–1410) and Boleslaus I, Duke of Cieszyn (1410–1414)						
Casimir I of Oświęcim	1396; Son of Przemysław of Oświęcim	1 January 1406 – 7 April 1434	Duchy of Oświęcim	Anna of Żagań; 1417 three children Margareta of Racibórz; 1433 no children	7 April 1434 aged 37–38	
Bolesław I, Duke of Cieszyn	1363; Second son of Przemyslaus I Noszak, Duke of Cieszyn and Elisabeth of Bytom	23 May 1410 – 6 May 1431	Duchy of Cieszyn (with Duchy of Głogów Half B and Duchy of Bytom Half B)	Margareta of Opava; 1 January 1406 no children Euphemia of Masovia; 20 November 1412 five children	6 May 1431 aged 67–68	
Jan of Ziębice	1380; First son of Bolko III of Ziębice and Euphemia of Bytom	13 June 1410 – 27 August 1428	Duchy of Ziębice	Elizabeth Lackfi; 19 March 1408 one child	27 August 1428; Stary Wielisław aged 47–48	Children of Bolko III, ruled jointly.
Henry II of Ziębice	1396; Second son of Bolko III of Ziębice and Euphemia of Bytom	13 June 1410 – 11 March 1420	Duchy of Ziębice	Unmarried	11 March 1420 in Livonia aged 23–24	Children of Bolko III, ruled jointly.
Konrad IV the Elder	1384; First son of Konrad III the Old and Judith	28 December 1412 – 9 August 1447	Duchy of Oleśnica (in the whole duchy, plus Duchy of Bytom Half A until 1416; in Kąty, Bierutów, Prudnik and Syców from 1416)	Unmarried	9 August 1447; Jelcz aged 62–63	In 1416, he abdicated to his younger brothers, but not without retaining some towns for himself.
Konrad V Kantner	1385; Oleśnica or Kąty (?); Second son of Konrad III the Old and Judith	1412 – 10 September 1439	Duchy of Oleśnica (in Oleśnica, Milicz, Prusice, Trzebnica, Wasosz, Zmigrod and Wołów, with Duchy of Bytom Half A)	Margaret (?); 9 October 1411 five children	10 September 1439 aged 53–54	Younger brothers of Konrad IV, divided their domains; Konrad VI left his possessions to his younger brother Konrad VIII, and Konrad V did the same to his brother Konrad VII, who ended up inheriting all of his brothers' possessions (Konrad V's in 1439, Konrad VI and VIII's in 1444, and Konrad IV's in 1447). In 1450, Konrad VII, now ruling alone, abdicated all his possessions to his nephews and heirs.
Konrad VI the Dean	1391; Oleśnica; Third son of Konrad III the Old and Judith	1416 – 3 September 1427	Duchy of Oleśnica (in Ścinawa, Lubiąż and Wołów)	Unmarried	3 September 1427 aged 35–36	Younger brothers of Konrad IV, divided their domains; Konrad VI left his possessions to his younger brother Konrad VIII, and Konrad V did the same to his brother Konrad VII, who ended up inheriting all of his brothers' possessions (Konrad V's in 1439, Konrad VI and VIII's in 1444, and Konrad IV's in 1447). In 1450, Konrad VII, now ruling alone, abdicated all his possessions to his nephews and heirs.
Konrad VII the White	1396; Oleśnica; Fourth son of Konrad III the Old and Judith	1416–1450	Duchy of Oleśnica (in Koźle, Gliwice and Prusice; in the whole duchy from 1447)	Katharina (?); 2 February 1437 no children Dorothea of Warsaw? 7 March 1450 no children	14 February 1452; Wrocław aged 55–56	Younger brothers of Konrad IV, divided their domains; Konrad VI left his possessions to his younger brother Konrad VIII, and Konrad V did the same to his brother Konrad VII, who ended up inheriting all of his brothers' possessions (Konrad V's in 1439, Konrad VI and VIII's in 1444, and Konrad IV's in 1447). In 1450, Konrad VII, now ruling alone, abdicated all his possessions to his nephews and heirs.
Konrad VIII the Younger	1397; Oleśnica; Fifth son of Konrad III the Old and Judith	1416 – 5 September 1444	Duchy of Oleśnica (in Rudna; at Ścinawa and Lubiąż since 1427)	Unmarried	5 September 1444 aged 46–47	Younger brothers of Konrad IV, divided their domains; Konrad VI left his possessions to his younger brother Konrad VIII, and Konrad V did the same to his brother Konrad VII, who ended up inheriting all of his brothers' possessions (Konrad V's in 1439, Konrad VI and VIII's in 1444, and Konrad IV's in 1447). In 1450, Konrad VII, now ruling alone, abdicated all his possessions to his nephews and heirs.
Rupert II of Lubin	1396; First son of Henry IX of Lubin and Anna of Cieszyn	10 July 1420 – 24 August 1431	Duchy of Lubin (at Lubin proper)	Unmarried	24 August 1431 aged 34–35	Children of Henry IX divided their possessions. Wenceslaus kept Olawa and Rupert ruled in Lubin. Louis, the younger son, ascended later, reuniting the possessions of his brothers.
Wenceslaus III of Oława	1400; Second son of Henry IX of Lubin and Anna of Cieszyn	10 July 1420 – 28 May 1423	Duchy of Lubin (at Oława)	Unmarried	28 May 1423 aged 22–23	Children of Henry IX divided their possessions. Wenceslaus kept Olawa and Rupert ruled in Lubin. Louis, the younger son, ascended later, reuniting the possessions of his brothers.
Louis III of Oława	c. 1405; Third son of Henry IX of Lubin and Anna of Cieszyn	28 May 1423 – June 1441	Duchy of Lubin (at Oława; in Lubin since 1431)	Margareta of Opole c. 1423 two children	June 1441 aged 35–36	Children of Henry IX divided their possessions. Wenceslaus kept Olawa and Rupert ruled in Lubin. Louis, the younger son, ascended later, reuniting the possessions of his brothers.
Euphemia of Ziębice	1385; Daughter of Bolko III of Ziębice and Euphemia of Bytom	27 August 1428 – 1443	Duchy of Ziębice	Frederick III, Count of Oettingen; 1397 nine children	17 November 1447 aged 57–58	Faced opposition to her succession by the Častolovice family, with whom she had to negotiate her succession. Despite being in Ziebice/Munsterberg since the death of her husband (1423) and prior to her brother's death (1428), and being cited as Euphemia [...] Herczoginne czu Monstirbergk in 1429, only in 1435 she saw her rights recognised by Bohemia. In 1443, after years of conflict, she abdicated to her nephew, the Duke of Opava, who was also married to a Častolovice heiress.
Ziębice was annexed to the Duchy of Opava
Regency of Euphemia of Masovia (1431–1442)						Divided their inheritance after the end of the regency of their mother. After Ladislaus' death, Premislaus retained co-rulership in Cieszyn, with his brother Wenceslaus, and in Głogów, associated with his widowed sister-in-law. Wenceslaus inherited half of Bytom that the family had, exchanging it with his brother Boleslaus, but returning to him after Boleslaus' death shortly after the exchange. Wenceslaus resigned this half in 1459, returning it to Oleśnica, which reunited Bytom under Oleśnica rule.
Wenceslaus I, Duke of Cieszyn	1413; First son of Bolesław I, Duke of Cieszyn and Margareta of Opava	6 May 1431 – 1468	Duchy of Cieszyn (with Duchy of Bytom Half B 1431–1452 and 1452–1459)	Elisabeth of Brandenburg, Duchess of Brzeg-Legnica and Cieszyn; 17 February 1439 (annulled 1445) no children	1474 aged 60–61	
Władysław of Głogów	1420; Second son of Bolesław I, Duke of Cieszyn and Margareta of Opava	6 May 1431 – 14 February 1460	Duchy of Głogów (Half B)	Margareta of Celje; December 1444 no children	14 February 1460 aged 39–40	
Przemysław II, Duke of Cieszyn	1422; Third son of Bolesław I, Duke of Cieszyn and Margareta of Opava	6 May 1431 – 18 March 1477	Duchy of Cieszyn (with Duchy of Głogów Half B since 1460)	Anna of Warsaw c. 1465 one child	18 March 1477 aged 54–55	
Bolesław II, Duke of Cieszyn	1425; Fourth son of Bolesław I, Duke of Cieszyn and Margareta of Opava	6 May 1431 – 4 October 1452	Duchy of Cieszyn (at Bielsko and Frysztat; in Duchy of Bytom Half B in 1452)	Anna of Bielsk; 28 January 1448 three children	4 October 1452 aged 26–27	
Wenceslaus I of Zator	1418; First son of Casimir I of Oświęcim and Anna of Żagań	7 April 1434 – 28 July 1468	Duchy of Zator	Margareta Kopczowski c. 1450 seven children	28 July 1468 aged 49–50	Children of Casimir I divided their inheritance. The main duchy went to Jan IV of Oświęcim, who sold it to Poland in 1456. However, Zator remained active for another generation.
Przemysław of Toszek	1425; Second son of Casimir I of Oświęcim and Anna of Żagań	7 April 1434 – December 1484	Duchy of Oświęcim (at Toszek)	Margaret of Opole; 23 February 1463 one child	December 1484 aged 58–59	Children of Casimir I divided their inheritance. The main duchy went to Jan IV of Oświęcim, who sold it to Poland in 1456. However, Zator remained active for another generation.
Jan IV of Oświęcim	1426; Third son of Casimir I of Oświęcim and Anna of Żagań	7 April 1434 – 11 October 1456 1490 – 21 February 1497	Duchy of Oświęcim (at Oświęcim proper until 1456; at Krnov jure uxoris since 1490)	Catharina; 30 December 1465 no children Barbara of Karniów c. 1475 one child	21 February 1497 aged 70–71	Children of Casimir I divided their inheritance. The main duchy went to Jan IV of Oświęcim, who sold it to Poland in 1456. However, Zator remained active for another generation.
Oświęcim annexed to the Kingdom of Poland; Toszek annexed to Poland (1484–1495), and recovered by the Duchy of Opole and Racibórz
Elisabeth of Brandenburg, Duchess of Brzeg-Legnica and Cieszyn	29 September 1403; Daughter of Frederick I, Elector of Brandenburg and Elisabeth of Bavaria-Landshut	30 May 1436 – 31 October 1449	Duchy of Brzeg (at Duchy of Legnica only since 1443)	Louis II of Brieg; 9 April 1418; Konstanz no children Wenceslaus I, Duke of Cieszyn; 17 February 1439 (annulled 1445) no children	31 October 1449 aged 45	Widow of Louis II. In 1443 is forced to give Brzeg to Jan I of Opole and Henry X of Lubin, reuniting the Lubin inheritance. After her death in 1449, Legnica was annexed by the Kingdom of Bohemia.
Legnica annexed to the Kingdom of Bohemia (1449–1454)
Jan I of Opole	1410; Second son of Bolko IV of Opole and Margaret of Gorizia	6 May 1437 – 5 September 1439	Duchy of Opole (with Duchy of Brzeg since 1450)	Unmarried	5 September 1439 aged 28–29	Children of Bolko IV, ruled jointly. After Jan IV's death in 1439, Nicholas ruled alone. In 1450, Nicholas bought Brzeg, possibly in virtue of his marriage.
Nicholas I of Opole	1424; Fourth son of Bolko IV of Opole and Margaret of Gorizia	6 May 1437 – 3 July 1476	Duchy of Opole (with Duchy of Brzeg since 1450)	Magdalena of Brzeg; February 1442 ten children	3 July 1476 aged 51–52	Children of Bolko IV, ruled jointly. After Jan IV's death in 1439, Nicholas ruled alone. In 1450, Nicholas bought Brzeg, possibly in virtue of his marriage.
Scholastica of Saxe-Wittenberg	1391; Daughter of Rudolf III, Duke of Saxe-Wittenberg and Anna of Meissen	12 April 1439 – 12 May 1461	Duchy of Żagań (in Nowogród Bobrzański)	Jan I of Żagań; 1408 ten children	12 May 1461; Żagań aged 69–70	Heirs of Jan I. Scholastica inherited her dower seat, and her sons managed the rest of the duchy, dividing it into two parts. In 1461–1472, Balthasar and Jan were involved in a feudal war that ended with Balthasar's death. However, Jan was in debt and in the end had to sell the duchy he fought to obtain. In 1476–1480, he managed to gain both parts of Głogów, which he reunited, but he surrendered to the Kingdom of Poland in 1488.
Balthasar of Żagań	1415; First son of Jan I of Żagań and Scholastica of Saxe-Wittenberg	12 April 1439 – 1461 1468 – 15 July 1472	Duchy of Żagań (in Żagań proper)	Agnes c. 1460 one child Barbara of Cieszyn; 11 September 1469 no children	15 July 1472; Przewóz aged 56–57	Heirs of Jan I. Scholastica inherited her dower seat, and her sons managed the rest of the duchy, dividing it into two parts. In 1461–1472, Balthasar and Jan were involved in a feudal war that ended with Balthasar's death. However, Jan was in debt and in the end had to sell the duchy he fought to obtain. In 1476–1480, he managed to gain both parts of Głogów, which he reunited, but he surrendered to the Kingdom of Poland in 1488.
Rudolf of Żagań	1418; Second son of Jan I of Żagań and Scholastica of Saxe-Wittenberg	12 April 1439 – 18 September 1454	Duchy of Żagań (in Żagań proper)	Unmarried	18 September 1454; Chojnice aged 35–36	Heirs of Jan I. Scholastica inherited her dower seat, and her sons managed the rest of the duchy, dividing it into two parts. In 1461–1472, Balthasar and Jan were involved in a feudal war that ended with Balthasar's death. However, Jan was in debt and in the end had to sell the duchy he fought to obtain. In 1476–1480, he managed to gain both parts of Głogów, which he reunited, but he surrendered to the Kingdom of Poland in 1488.
Wenceslaus of Żagań	1434; Third son of Jan I of Żagań and Scholastica of Saxe-Wittenberg	12 April 1439 – 12 December 1472	Duchy of Żagań (at Przewóz)	Unmarried	29 April 1488; Wrocław aged 53–54	Heirs of Jan I. Scholastica inherited her dower seat, and her sons managed the rest of the duchy, dividing it into two parts. In 1461–1472, Balthasar and Jan were involved in a feudal war that ended with Balthasar's death. However, Jan was in debt and in the end had to sell the duchy he fought to obtain. In 1476–1480, he managed to gain both parts of Głogów, which he reunited, but he surrendered to the Kingdom of Poland in 1488.
Jan II the Mad	16 April 1435; Fourth son of Jan I of Żagań and Scholastica of Saxe-Wittenberg	12 April 1439 – 1468 15 July – 12 December 1472	Duchy of Żagań (at Przewóz until 1461; at Żagań in 1461–1468 and 1472)	Catharina of Opava; 1462 five children	22 September 1504; Wołów aged 69	Heirs of Jan I. Scholastica inherited her dower seat, and her sons managed the rest of the duchy, dividing it into two parts. In 1461–1472, Balthasar and Jan were involved in a feudal war that ended with Balthasar's death. However, Jan was in debt and in the end had to sell the duchy he fought to obtain. In 1476–1480, he managed to gain both parts of Głogów, which he reunited, but he surrendered to the Kingdom of Poland in 1488.
Jan II the Mad	16 April 1435; Fourth son of Jan I of Żagań and Scholastica of Saxe-Wittenberg	22 February 1476 – November 1488	Duchy of Głogów (both halves reunited 1480)	Catharina of Opava; 1462 five children	22 September 1504; Wołów aged 69	Heirs of Jan I. Scholastica inherited her dower seat, and her sons managed the rest of the duchy, dividing it into two parts. In 1461–1472, Balthasar and Jan were involved in a feudal war that ended with Balthasar's death. However, Jan was in debt and in the end had to sell the duchy he fought to obtain. In 1476–1480, he managed to gain both parts of Głogów, which he reunited, but he surrendered to the Kingdom of Poland in 1488.
Nowogród Bobrzański remerged into Żagań (since 1461); Żagań sold to the Duchy of Saxony (since 1472)
Głogów surrendered and annexed to the Kingdom of Poland; at the same time, Lubin, since 1446 part of Głogów, reverted to Legnica
Margaret (wife of Konrad V Kantner)	c. 1390? ?	10 September 1439 – 15 March 1449	Duchy of Oleśnica (in Wołów)	Konrad V Kantner; 9 October 1411 five children	15 March 1449 aged 58–59?	Widow of Konrad V, inherited Wołów as dowry, which after her death reverted, similarly to the rest of Konrad V's possessions, to Konrad VII.
Wołów remerged in Oleśnica
Margareta of Opole	1412; Daughter of Bolko IV of Opole and Margaret of Gorizia	June 1441 – 15 January 1454	Duchy of Lubin (at Oława)	Louis III of Oława; 1423 two children	15 January 1454 aged 41–42	Heirs of Louis III. Margareta inherited Olawa as a dower seat, and her children ruled jointly. In 1443, they inherited Brzeg from Elisabeth of Brandenburg, but, in 1446, due to the difficult financial situation, had to sell Lubin to the Duchy of Głogów. In 1450, Brzeg was also sold to Opole. Chojnów was the only main town kept by the brothers, and the one they left to Frederick I, John I's son. Olawa was also inherited by Frederick (Margareta's grandson). The duchy recentered, since 1454, around Legnica.
John I of Lüben	1425; First son of Louis III of Oława and Margareta of Opole	June 1441 – November 1453	Duchy of Lubin (at Chojnów; in Lubin proper until 1446; with Duchy of Brzeg since 1443)	Hedwig of Brzeg; February 1445 one child	November 1453 aged 27–28	
Henry X of Haynau	1426; Second son of Louis III of Oława and Margareta of Opole	June 1441 – May 1452	Duchy of Lubin (at Chojnów; in Lubin proper until 1446; with Duchy of Brzeg since 1443)	Unmarried	May 1452 aged 25–26	
Olawa returned to Chojnów/Legnica; Lubin was bought by Henry IX the Elder, duke of Głogów
Brzeg was bought by duke Nicholas I of Opole
Bolko V the Hussite	c. 1400; First son of Bolko IV of Opole and Margaret of Gorizia	1450 – 29 May 1460	Duchy of Opole (at Strzelce and Niemodlin)	Elisabeth Granowski; 1418 (annulled 1451) one child Hedwig Beess of Kujawy; 27 June 1451 no children	29 May 1460; Głogówek aged 59–60	Inherited his portion from his uncle, and left to his younger brothers the main duchy of Opole, leaving them his own lands after his death.
Niemodlin and Strzelce annexed to Opole
Konrad IX the Black	1415; First son of Konrad V Kantner and Margaret (wife of Konrad V Kantner)	1450 – 14 August 1471	Duchy of Oleśnica (in Oleśnica, Bierutów, Gliwice and Koźle, with Duchy of Bytom Half A)	Margareta of Rawa; 1453 one child	14 August 1471 aged 55–56	Children of Konrad V, divided their inheritance. After Konrad IX's death, and save some exceptions (inherited by Konrad IX's widow and daughter), the majority of Konrad IX's inheritance went to Konrad X. Those exceptions eventually also ended up in Konrad X's possession in 1478, reuniting all the duchy, which, after his death, was annexed by the Kingdom of Bohemia.
Konrad X the White	1420; Second son of Conrad V and Margaret (wife of Konrad V Kantner)	1450 – 21 September 1492	Duchy of Oleśnica (in Milicz, Prusice, Ścinawa, Syców, Wasosz, Zmigrod and Wołów; in the whole duchy since 1478)	Dorothea Reynkenberg before 1492 (morganatic) no children	21 September 1492 small>aged 71–72	Children of Konrad V, divided their inheritance. After Konrad IX's death, and save some exceptions (inherited by Konrad IX's widow and daughter), the majority of Konrad IX's inheritance went to Konrad X. Those exceptions eventually also ended up in Konrad X's possession in 1478, reuniting all the duchy, which, after his death, was annexed by the Kingdom of Bohemia.
Oleśnica was annexed, in 1492, to the Kingdom of Bohemia
Regency of Hedwig of Brzeg (1453–1466)						Frederick I was responsible for the recovery of the patrimony lost to other polities: Legnica became independent from Bohemia in 1454. In the same year, Frederick inherited Olawa from his grandmother, Margareta of Opole. In 1481, Frederick I of Legnica purchased Brzeg from Opole and recovered Lubin from Jan II the Mad in 1482.
Frederick I of Liegnitz	3 May 1446; Brzeg; Son of John I of Lüben and Hedwig of Brzeg	November 1453 – 9 May 1488	Duchy of Legnica (at Chojnów; in Legnica proper and Oława since 1454; with Duchy of Lubin and Duchy of Brzeg since 1481))	Ludmila of Poděbrady; 5 September 1474 three children	9 May 1488; Legnica aged 42	Frederick I was responsible for the recovery of the patrimony lost to other polities: Legnica became independent from Bohemia in 1454. In the same year, Frederick inherited Olawa from his grandmother, Margareta of Opole. In 1481, Frederick I of Legnica purchased Brzeg from Opole and recovered Lubin from Jan II the Mad in 1482.
Margareta of Celje	1411; Daughter of Herman III, Count of Celje, and Elisabeth of Abensberg	14 February 1460 – 22 July 1480	Duchy of Głogów (Half B)	Herman I, Count of Montfort-Pfannberg; 15 March 1430 four children Władysław of Głogów; December 1444 no children	22 July 1480 aged 68–69	Widow of Ladislaus I, ruled with her brother-in-law Premislaus II, until his death in 1477, after which she continued her rule alone. After her death, both parts of Glogow were reunited under the ex-duke of Żagań.
Głogów half B was inherited by Jan II the Mad
Henry XI of Głogów	1435; Son of Henry IX the Elder and Hedwig of Oleśnica	11 November 1467 – 22 February 1476	Duchy of Głogów (Half A)	Barbara of Brandenburg (1464–1515); 11 October 1472; Berlin no children	22 February 1476	Possibly poisoned. After his death, the majority of his patrimony was inherited by his cousin, the disposssessed ex-Żagań duke John the Mad (see above).
Głogów half A (with exceptions) was inherited by Jan II the Mad
Casimir II of Zator	c.1450 First son of Wenceslaus I of Zator and Margareta Kopczowski	28 July 1468 – 7 July 1490	Duchy of Zator	Margaret of Karniów; 12 August 1482 one child	7 July 1490 aged 39–40	Sons of Wenceslaus I, ruled jointly. In 1490, John became the sole ruler. In 1513, after John V's death with no descendants, the Duchy was annexed by the Kingdom of Poland.
Wenceslaus II of Zator	c. 1450; Second son of Wenceslaus I of Zator and Margareta Kopczowski	28 July 1468 – 1487	Duchy of Zator	Unmarried	1487 aged 36–37	Sons of Wenceslaus I, ruled jointly. In 1490, John became the sole ruler. In 1513, after John V's death with no descendants, the Duchy was annexed by the Kingdom of Poland.
Jan V of Zator	c. 1455; Third son of Wenceslaus I of Zator and Margareta Kopczowski	28 July 1468 – 17 September 1513	Duchy of Zator	Unmarried	17 September 1513 aged 57–58	Sons of Wenceslaus I, ruled jointly. In 1490, John became the sole ruler. In 1513, after John V's death with no descendants, the Duchy was annexed by the Kingdom of Poland.
Władysław of Zator	c.1455 Fourth son of Wenceslaus I of Zator and Margareta Kopczowski	28 July 1468 – 21 September 1494	Duchy of Zator	Anna before 1488 one child	21 September 1494 aged 38–39	Sons of Wenceslaus I, ruled jointly. In 1490, John became the sole ruler. In 1513, after John V's death with no descendants, the Duchy was annexed by the Kingdom of Poland.
Zator annexed to the Kingdom of Poland
Margareta of Rawa	1441; Daughter of Siemowit V of Masovia and Margareta of Racibórz	14 August 1471 – 1475	Duchy of Oleśnica (Oleśnica and Bierutów, with Duchy of Bytom Half A)	Konrad IX the Black; 1453 one child	1 September 1485 aged 43–44	Widow of Konrad IX, inherited part of the properties of her husband, which passed to her daughter.
Regency of Konrad X the White (1475–1478)						Deposed in 1478 by her regent and died the next year. Her possessions, inherited from her mother, were inherited by her uncle.
Barbara of Oleśnica	1465; Daughter of Konrad IX the Black and Margareta of Rawa	1475–1478	Duchy of Oleśnica (Oleśnica and Bierutów, with Duchy of Bytom Half A)	Unmarried	30 November 1479 aged 13–14	Deposed in 1478 by her regent and died the next year. Her possessions, inherited from her mother, were inherited by her uncle.
Barbara's possessions were inherited by her uncle Conrad X, who reunited Oleśnica in 1478 (see above).
Barbara of Brandenburg	30 May 1464; Ansbach; Daughter of Albert Achilles, Elector of Brandenburg and Anna of Saxony, Electress of Brandenburg	22 February 1476 – 4 September 1515	Duchy of Głogów (at Krosno Odrzańskie, Kożuchów, Sulechów and Lubsko)	Henry XI of Głogów; 11 October 1472; Berlin no children Vladislaus II of Hungary; 20 August 1476; Frankfurt (Oder) (separated 1490, annulled 1500) no children	4 September 1515; Ansbach aged 51	Received a dower from her husband, which after her death was annexed to Brandenburg.
Krosno Odrzańskie, Kożuchów, Sulechów and Lubsko were annexed to Brandenburg
Louis of Opole	1450; First son of Nicholas I of Opole and Magdalena of Brzeg	3 July – September 1476	Duchy of Opole (until 1521; with Brzeg until 1481) Duchy of Opole and Racibórz (from 1521)	Unmarried	September 1476 aged 25–26	Children of Nicholas I, ruled jointly. In 1481, they sold Brzeg to Frederick I of Liegnitz. From 1497, John ruled alone, purchasing back, in 1521, the lost Racibórz from Bohemia, and restoring the Duchy of Opole and Racibórz. However, as he left no descendants, the duchy reverted to the Margraviate of Brandenburg-Ansbach.
Jan II the Good	1460; Second son of Nicholas I of Opole and Magdalena of Brzeg	3 July 1476 – 27 March 1532	Duchy of Opole (until 1521; with Brzeg until 1481) Duchy of Opole and Racibórz (from 1521)	Unmarried	27 March 1532 aged 71–72	Children of Nicholas I, ruled jointly. In 1481, they sold Brzeg to Frederick I of Liegnitz. From 1497, John ruled alone, purchasing back, in 1521, the lost Racibórz from Bohemia, and restoring the Duchy of Opole and Racibórz. However, as he left no descendants, the duchy reverted to the Margraviate of Brandenburg-Ansbach.
Nicholas II of Niemodlin	1462; Third son of Nicholas I of Opole and Magdalena of Brzeg	3 July 1476 – 27 June 1497	Duchy of Opole (until 1521; with Brzeg until 1481) Duchy of Opole and Racibórz (from 1521)	Unmarried	27 June 1497 aged 34–35	Children of Nicholas I, ruled jointly. In 1481, they sold Brzeg to Frederick I of Liegnitz. From 1497, John ruled alone, purchasing back, in 1521, the lost Racibórz from Bohemia, and restoring the Duchy of Opole and Racibórz. However, as he left no descendants, the duchy reverted to the Margraviate of Brandenburg-Ansbach.
Brzeg returned to Legnica
Opole-Racibórz annexed to the Margraviate of Brandenburg-Ansbach
Casimir II, Duke of Cieszyn	1449; Son of Bolesław II, Duke of Cieszyn and Anna of Bielsk	18 March 1477 – 13 December 1528	Duchy of Cieszyn	Johanna of Poděbrady; 15 February 1480 six children	13 December 1528; Cieszyn aged 78–79	Father and son ruled jointly. Casimir predeceased his father and never came to rule alone.
Wenceslaus II, Duke of Cieszyn	1488; Cieszyn; Son of Casimir II, Duke of Cieszyn and Johanna of Poděbrady	1518 – 17 November 1524	Duchy of Cieszyn	Anna of Brandenburg-Ansbach; 1 December 1518 three children	17 November 1524; Cieszyn aged 35–36	Father and son ruled jointly. Casimir predeceased his father and never came to rule alone.
Ludmila of Poděbrady	16 October 1446; Daughter of George of Poděbrady and Joanna of Rožmitál	9 May 1488 – 20 January 1503	Duchy of Brzeg	Frederick I, Duke of Legnica; 5 September 1474 three children	20 January 1503; Legnica aged 56	Heirs of Frederick I. His widow, Ludmila, retained Brzeg as dower seat and also the regency over her minor children. John died as a minor, and the partition was made between the younger sons, Frederick and George. It was George who eventually inherited his mother's dower, and transferred it to his brother after his death with no descendants. George's widow retained Lubin, which, after her death, would join Frederick's patrimony, again united.
Regency of Ludmila of Poděbrady (1488–1495)						Heirs of Frederick I. His widow, Ludmila, retained Brzeg as dower seat and also the regency over her minor children. John died as a minor, and the partition was made between the younger sons, Frederick and George. It was George who eventually inherited his mother's dower, and transferred it to his brother after his death with no descendants. George's widow retained Lubin, which, after her death, would join Frederick's patrimony, again united.
John II of Legnica	1477; First son of Frederick I of Liegnitz and Ludmila of Poděbrady	9 May 1488 – 6 March 1495	Duchy of Legnica (with Duchy of Brzeg since 1521)	Unmarried	6 March 1495 aged 17–18	Heirs of Frederick I. His widow, Ludmila, retained Brzeg as dower seat and also the regency over her minor children. John died as a minor, and the partition was made between the younger sons, Frederick and George. It was George who eventually inherited his mother's dower, and transferred it to his brother after his death with no descendants. George's widow retained Lubin, which, after her death, would join Frederick's patrimony, again united.
Frederick II of Legnica	12 February 1480; Legnica; Second son of Frederick I of Liegnitz and Ludmila of Poděbrady	9 May 1488 – 17 September 1547	Duchy of Legnica (with Duchy of Brzeg since 1521)	Elisabeth Jagiellon; 21 November 1515 one child Sophie of Brandenburg-Ansbach-Kulmbach; 14 November 1519 three children	17 September 1547; Legnica aged 67	Heirs of Frederick I. His widow, Ludmila, retained Brzeg as dower seat and also the regency over her minor children. John died as a minor, and the partition was made between the younger sons, Frederick and George. It was George who eventually inherited his mother's dower, and transferred it to his brother after his death with no descendants. George's widow retained Lubin, which, after her death, would join Frederick's patrimony, again united.
George I of Brieg	1481; Third son of Frederick I of Liegnitz and Ludmila of Poděbrady	9 May 1488 – 30 May 1521	Duchy of Lubin (with Duchy of Brzeg since 1503)	Anna of Pomerania, Duchess of Lubin; 9 June 1516 no children	30 May 1521 aged 39–40	Heirs of Frederick I. His widow, Ludmila, retained Brzeg as dower seat and also the regency over her minor children. John died as a minor, and the partition was made between the younger sons, Frederick and George. It was George who eventually inherited his mother's dower, and transferred it to his brother after his death with no descendants. George's widow retained Lubin, which, after her death, would join Frederick's patrimony, again united.
Helena of Oświęcim	1478; Daughter of Jan IV of Oświęcim and Barbara of Karniów	27 April 1510 – 1523	Duchy of Oświęcim (at Krnov only)	George, Baron of Schellenberg; 1492 four children	1525 aged 46–47	Inherited the property of her mother at Krnov (see next table below), but her husband eventually sold it in 1523 to Brandenburg.
Krnov sold to Brandenburg-Ansbach
Anna of Pomerania, Duchess of Lubin	1492; Daughter of Bogislaw X, Duke of Pomerania and Anna Jagiellon, Duchess of Pomerania	30 May 1521 – 25 April 1550	Duchy of Lubin	George I of Brieg; 9 June 1516 no children	25 April 1550 aged 57–58	Inherited Lubin from her husband. As she didn't have children, the land passed, at her death, permanently to Legnica.
Lubin was definitely annexed to Legnica
Regencies of Anna of Brandenburg-Ansbach (1528–1539) and John III of Pernstein (1528–1545)						
Wenceslaus III Adam, Duke of Cieszyn	December 1524; Cieszyn; Son of Wenceslaus II, Duke of Cieszyn and Anna of Brandenburg-Ansbach	13 December 1528 – 4 November 1579	Duchy of Cieszyn	Maria of Pernstein; 8 February 1540 three children Sidonia Catharina of Saxe-Lauenburg; 25 November 1567; Cieszyn six children	4 November 1579; Cieszyn aged 54	
Frederick Casimir of Cieszyn	December 1541; Cieszyn; Son of Wenceslaus III Adam, Duke of Cieszyn and Maria of Pernstein	1560 – 4 May 1571	Duchy of Cieszyn	Catharina of Legnica; 28 December 1563; Legnica one child	4 May 1571; Cieszyn aged 29	Son of Wenceslaus III, co-ruled with him from 1560 but preceded his father in death.
Frederick III of Legnica	22 February 1520; Legnica; First son of Frederick II of Legnica and Sophie of Brandenburg-Ansbach-Kulmbach	17 September 1547 – 1551 1556 – 1559	Duchy of Legnica (with Lubin since 1550)	Catherine of Mecklenburg-Schwerin; 3 March 1538; Legnica six children	15 December 1570; Legnica aged 50	Children of Frederick II, divided the land: Frederick III kept Legnica (and absorbed Lubin in 1550), and George II inherited Brzeg. Frederick was deposed two times by Charles V, Holy Roman Emperor, and later Ferdinand I, Holy Roman Emperor, and was put under house arrest since 1559. Despite being deprived of power, after his death, his wife received a dower seat.
George II of Brieg	18 July 1523; Legnica; Second son of Frederick II of Legnica and Sophie of Brandenburg-Ansbach-Kulmbach	17 September 1547 – 7 May 1586	Duchy of Brzeg	Barbara of Brandenburg, Duchess of Brieg; 15 February 1545; Berlin seven children	7 May 1586; Brzeg aged 62	Children of Frederick II, divided the land: Frederick III kept Legnica (and absorbed Lubin in 1550), and George II inherited Brzeg. Frederick was deposed two times by Charles V, Holy Roman Emperor, and later Ferdinand I, Holy Roman Emperor, and was put under house arrest since 1559. Despite being deprived of power, after his death, his wife received a dower seat.
Council of Regency presided by George II of Brieg (1551–1556)						Victim of the maneuvers of the Holy Roman Emperors, who sought to depose his father. Installed very young, was deposed by his father, and restored again, when his father became imprisoned for life. He went abroad and left his brother Frederick in his stead, but he seized the opportunity to be recognised as the legitimate duke in 1576. Thanks to the efforts of Sophie of Brandenburg, Henry XI was restored to the duchy in 1580, with Frederick as a co-ruler in Chojnów. However, after he disrespected the imperial authority, he was again dispossessed and took refuge in Poland.
Henry XI of Legnica	23 February 1539; Legnica; First son of Frederick III of Legnica and Catherine of Mecklenburg-Schwerin	1551 – 1556 1559 – 13 March 1576 5 October 1580 – August 1581	Duchy of Legnica	Sophie of Brandenburg-Ansbach; 11 November 1560; Legnica six children	3 March 1588; Kraków aged 49	
Catherine of Mecklenburg-Schwerin	14 April 1518; Daughter of Henry V, Duke of Mecklenburg-Schwerin and Helen of the Palatinate	15 December 1570 – 17 November 1581	Duchy of Legnica (in Chojnów)	Frederick III of Legnica; 3 March 1538; Legnica six children	17 November 1581 aged 63	Widow of Frederick III. Despite being the wife of a dispossessed duke, she received a dower seat after his death.
Frederick IV of Liegnitz	20 April 1552; Legnica; Second son of Frederick III of Legnica and Catherine of Mecklenburg-Schwerin	13 March 1576 – 27 March 1596	Duchy of Legnica (in Legnica proper in 1576–1580 and since 1581; at Chojnów in 1580–1581)	Maria Sidonia of Cieszyn; 20 January 1587 no children Dorothea of Holstein-Sonderburg; 23 November 1589 no children Anna of Württemberg; 24 October 1594 no children	27 March 1596; Legnica aged 44	After his brother's definitive and forced retirement in Poland, Frederick could ascend as the new duke, without opposition. Left no descendants.
Legnica temporarily annexed to Brzeg
Regency of Sidonia Catharina of Saxe-Lauenburg (1579–1594)						
Adam Wenceslaus, Duke of Cieszyn	12 December 1574; Cieszyn; Son of Wenceslaus III Adam, Duke of Cieszyn and Sidonia Catharina of Saxe-Lauenburg	4 November 1579 – 13 July 1617	Duchy of Cieszyn	Elisabeth of Courland; 17 September 1595 five children	13 July 1617; Cieszyn aged 42	
Barbara of Brandenburg, Duchess of Brieg	10 August 1527; Berlin; Daughter of Joachim II Hector, Elector of Brandenburg and Magdalena of Saxony	7 May 1586 – 2 January 1595	Duchy of Brzeg (at Brzeg proper)	George II; 15 February 1545; Berlin seven children	2 January 1595; Brzeg aged 67	Heirs of George II of Brieg. Barbara received Brzeg as her widow's seat. The rest of the patrimony was shared by the two sons of George and Barbara, with Oława and Wołów as the main towns. The brothers always ruled jointly. In 1592, John George of Ohlau died and left Oława to his widow, Anna, confining Joachim Frederick of Brieg's power to Wołów. However, Anna remarried in 1594, which meant her widow's seat returned to her brother-in-law. In the following years, Joachim Frederick of Brieg annexed his mother's dower in Brzeg (1595) and also Legnica in 1596.
Joachim Frederick of Brieg	29 September 1550; Brzeg; First son of George II of Brieg and Barbara of Brandenburg, Duchess of Brieg	7 May 1586 – 25 March 1602	Duchy of Brzeg (at Oława (1586–1592 and since 1594) and Wołów; in the entire Brzeg since 1595; in Duchy of Legnica since 1596)	Anna Maria of Anhalt; 19 May 1577; Brzeg six children	25 March 1602; Brzeg aged 51	
John George of Ohlau	17 June 1552; Wołów; Second son of George II of Brieg and Barbara of Brandenburg, Duchess of Brieg	7 May 1586 – 6 July 1592	Duchy of Brzeg (at Oława and Wołów)	Anna of Württemberg; 16 September 1582; Brzeg no children	6 July 1592; Oława aged 40	
Anna of Württemberg	12 June 1561; Stuttgart; Daughter of Christoph, Duke of Württemberg and Anna Maria of Brandenburg-Ansbach	6 July 1592 – 24 October 1594	Duchy of Brzeg (at Oława)	John George of Ohlau; 16 September 1582; Brzeg no children Frederick IV, Duke of Legnica; 24 October 1594 no children	7 July 1616; Chojnów aged 55	
Anna Maria of Anhalt	29 September 1550; Zerbst; Daughter of Joachim Ernest, Prince of Anhalt and Agnes of Barby-Mühlingen	25 March 1602 – 14 November 1605	Duchy of Brzeg (at Oława)	Joachim Frederick of Brieg; 19 May 1577; Brzeg six children	14 November 1605; Brzeg aged 55	Heirs of Joachim Frederick. His widow, Anna Maria, received Olawa as dower seat and retained the regency for her minor children, together with her sister-in-law, Elisabeth Magdalena, and her husband, who ruled until the brothers came of age in 1609. George Rudolf left no descendants and his patrimony was divided between his nephews.
Regencies of Anna Maria of Anhalt (1602–1605), Elisabeth Magdalena of Brzeg and Karl II, Duke of Münsterberg-Oels (1602–1609)						Heirs of Joachim Frederick. His widow, Anna Maria, received Olawa as dower seat and retained the regency for her minor children, together with her sister-in-law, Elisabeth Magdalena, and her husband, who ruled until the brothers came of age in 1609. George Rudolf left no descendants and his patrimony was divided between his nephews.
John Christian of Brieg	28 August 1591; Oława; First son of Joachim Frederick of Brieg and Anna Maria of Anhalt	25 March 1602 – 25 December 1639 (only de jure from 1633)	Duchy of Brzeg (at Brzeg proper)	Dorothea Sibylle of Brandenburg; 12 December 1610; Berlin thirteen children Anna Hedwig Sitzsch; 13 September 1626; Brzeg (morganatic) seven children	25 December 1639; Ostróda aged 48	Heirs of Joachim Frederick. His widow, Anna Maria, received Olawa as dower seat and retained the regency for her minor children, together with her sister-in-law, Elisabeth Magdalena, and her husband, who ruled until the brothers came of age in 1609. George Rudolf left no descendants and his patrimony was divided between his nephews.
George Rudolf of Liegnitz	12 January 1595; Oława; Second son of Joachim Frederick of Brieg and Anna Maria of Anhalt	25 March 1602 – 14 January 1653	Duchy of Legnica	Sophie Elisabeth of Anhalt-Dessau; 4 November 1614; Dessau no children Elisabeth Magdalena of Ziębice-Oleśnica; 5 December 1624 no children	14 January 1653; Wrocław aged 58	Heirs of Joachim Frederick. His widow, Anna Maria, received Olawa as dower seat and retained the regency for her minor children, together with her sister-in-law, Elisabeth Magdalena, and her husband, who ruled until the brothers came of age in 1609. George Rudolf left no descendants and his patrimony was divided between his nephews.
Regency of Charles of Austria, Bishop of Wroclaw (1617–1624)						
Frederick William, Duke of Cieszyn	9 November 1601; Cieszyn; Son of Adam Wenceslaus and Elisabeth of Courland	13 July 1617 – 13 August 1625	Duchy of Cieszyn	Unmarried	19 August 1625; Cologne aged 23	
Elizabeth Lucretia	1 June 1599; Cieszyn; Daughter of Adam Wenceslaus, Duke of Cieszyn and Elisabeth of Courland	13 August 1625 – 19 May 1653	Duchy of Cieszyn	Gundakar, Prince of Liechtenstein; 23 April 1618 three children	19 May 1653; Cieszyn aged 53	After her death, Cieszyn was annexed by the Holy Roman Empire.
Cieszyn efinitively annexed to the Holy Roman Empire
George III of Brieg	4 September 1611; Brzeg; First son of John Christian of Brieg and Dorothea Sibylle of Brandenburg	25 December 1639 – 4 July 1664 (co-ruling de facto as regent since 1633)	Duchy of Brzeg (in Duchy of Legnica in 1653–1654 and 1663–1664)	Sophia Catharina of Ziębice-Oleśnica; 23 February 1638; Bernstadt an der Weide one child Elisabeth Marie Charlotte of the Palatinate-Kaiserslautern; 19 October 1660; Brzeg no children	4 July 1664; Brzeg aged 52	Sons of John Christian, ruled jointly in Legnica. George was already the duke of Brzeg since his father's death. As George had no descendants, he was succeeded in his domains by his brother Christian. The latter, after his own death, left Oława to his widow, and the remaining lands were inherited by his own son.
Louis IV of Legnica	19 April 1616; Brzeg; Fifth son of John Christian of Brieg and Dorothea Sibylle of Brandenburg	25 December 1639 – 24 November 1663 (co-ruling de facto in Brzeg as regent since 1633)	Duchy of Legnica (in Duchy of Brzeg until 1653; at Legnica since 1653)	Anna Sophie of Mecklenburg-Güstrow; 8 May 1649; Brzeg one child	24 November 1663; Legnica aged 47	Sons of John Christian, ruled jointly in Legnica. George was already the duke of Brzeg since his father's death. As George had no descendants, he was succeeded in his domains by his brother Christian. The latter, after his own death, left Oława to his widow, and the remaining lands were inherited by his own son.
Christian, Duke of Brieg	9 April 1618; Oława; Seventh son of John Christian of Brieg and Dorothea Sibylle of Brandenburg	25 December 1639 – 28 February 1672 (co-ruling de facto in Brzeg as regent 1633–1639)	Duchy of Brzeg (at Oława; in Duchies of Legnica and Brzeg since 1664)	Louise of Anhalt-Dessau; 24 November 1648; Dessau four children	28 February 1672; Oława aged 53	Sons of John Christian, ruled jointly in Legnica. George was already the duke of Brzeg since his father's death. As George had no descendants, he was succeeded in his domains by his brother Christian. The latter, after his own death, left Oława to his widow, and the remaining lands were inherited by his own son.
Louise of Anhalt-Dessau	10 February 1631; Dessau; Daughter of John Casimir, Prince of Anhalt-Dessau and Agnes of Hesse-Kassel	28 February 1672 – 25 April 1680	Duchy of Brzeg (at Oława)	Christian, Duke of Brieg; 24 November 1648; Dessau four children	25 April 1680; Oława aged 49	Heirs of Christian. Louise retained her dower seat at Oława and the regency for her son over the rest of the duchies. George William was the last male representative of the House of Piast, as he died without descendants. After their deaths, their duchies were annexed by the Holy Roman Empire.
Regency of Louise of Anhalt-Dessau (1672–1675)						Heirs of Christian. Louise retained her dower seat at Oława and the regency for her son over the rest of the duchies. George William was the last male representative of the House of Piast, as he died without descendants. After their deaths, their duchies were annexed by the Holy Roman Empire.
George William, Duke of Liegnitz	29 September 1660; Oława; Son of Christian and Louise of Anhalt-Dessau	28 February 1672 – 21 November 1675	Duchy of Brzeg (at Brzeg proper; with Duchy of Legnica)	Unmarried	21 November 1675; Brzeg aged 15	Heirs of Christian. Louise retained her dower seat at Oława and the regency for her son over the rest of the duchies. George William was the last male representative of the House of Piast, as he died without descendants. After their deaths, their duchies were annexed by the Holy Roman Empire.
Oława, Legnica and Brzeg annexed to the Holy Roman Empire

=== Přemyslid, Dukes of Silesia ===
==== Partitions of Bohemian Silesia under the Přemyslid dynasty ====
Below follows a simplified table of Silesia's partitions:

		Piast Ráciborz (1282–1336)
Opava (1269–1456) (brief annexation to Piast Legnica in 1308–1311
Opava (1269–1456) (brief annexation to Piast Legnica in 1308–1311		Ráciborz (1378–1521)	Krnov (1424–1493) (brief annexation to Hungary in 1474–1490)
Glubczyce (1433–1485)		Ráciborz (1378–1521)	Krnov (1424–1493) (brief annexation to Hungary in 1474–1490)
Glubczyce (1433–1485)	Pledged to Opole and annexed to Bohemia	Ráciborz (1378–1521)	Krnov (1424–1493) (brief annexation to Hungary in 1474–1490)
Annexed to Bohemia	Pledged to Opole and annexed to Bohemia	Ráciborz (1378–1521)	Annexed to Bohemia
Annexed to Bohemia	Pledged to Opole and annexed to Bohemia	Annexed to Opole	Annexed to Bohemia

==== Table of rulers ====
Notes:
- The numbering of the Silesian Premyslid rulers is a problematic matter between scholars, as different sources number and order them differently.

Ruler	Born	Reign	Ruling part	Consort	Death	Notes
Nicholas I, Duke of Troppau	1255; Natural son of Premysl Ottokar II, King of Bohemia and Agnes of Kuenring	1269 – 25 July 1318	Duchy of Opava	Adelaide of Habsburg; 1283 three children	25 July 1318; Brno aged 62–63	Inherited from his father the Silesian duchy of Opava, which was independent from the Piast territory in Silesia.
Nicholas II, Duke of Troppau	1288; Son of Nicholas I, Duke of Troppau and Adelaide of Habsburg	25 July 1318 – 8 December 1365	Duchy of Opava	Anna, Duchess of Racibórz; 1318 six children Hedwig of Oleśnica (d.1359); May 1342 one child Judith of Opole; 1360 three children	8 December 1365 aged 76–77	
John I, Duke of Opava-Ratibor	1332; First son of Nicholas II, Duke of Troppau and Hedwig of Oleśnica	8 December 1365 – 1382	Duchy of Racibórz	Anna of Głogów-Żagań (d. 1369); 1361 three children	1382 aged 49–50	Children of Nicholas II, divided their inheritance; After Nicholas III's death, Glubczyce returned to Opava.
Nicholas III, Duke of Opava	1339; Second son of Nicholas II, Duke of Troppau and Hedwig of Oleśnica	8 December 1365 – 9 July 1394	Duchy of Opava (at Glubczyce)	Unmarried	9 July 1394 aged 54–55	Children of Nicholas II, divided their inheritance; After Nicholas III's death, Glubczyce returned to Opava.
Přemek I, Duke of Opava	c. 1350; Third son of Nicholas II, Duke of Troppau and Hedwig of Oleśnica	8 December 1365 – 28 September 1433	Duchy of Opava	Anna of Lutz (d. 1405); 1395 three children Catherine of Ziębice c. 1405 three children Helena of Bosnia; 1425 three children	28 September 1433; Opava aged 82–83?	Children of Nicholas II, divided their inheritance; After Nicholas III's death, Glubczyce returned to Opava.
Wenceslaus I, Duke of Opava	1361; Fourth son of Nicholas II, Duke of Troppau and Hedwig of Oleśnica	8 December 1365 – 1381	Duchy of Opava	Unmarried	1381 aged 19–20	Children of Nicholas II, divided their inheritance; After Nicholas III's death, Glubczyce returned to Opava.
Glubczyce returned to Opava
John II, Duke of Opava-Ratibor	c. 1365; First son of John I, Duke of Opava-Ratibor and Anna of Głogów-Żagań	1382–1424	Duchy of Racibórz (at Racibórz proper)	Helena of Lithuania; 16 January 1407 three children	1424 aged 58–59	Children of John I divided the land. John kept the main Ráciborz and Krnov, and Nicholas was given Bruntál. John lost Krnov in 1388, but recovered it in 1422.
Nicholas IV, Duke of Ratibor-Bruntál	c. 1370; Second son of John I, Duke of Opava-Ratibor and Anna of Głogów-Żagań	1382–1406	Duchy of Racibórz (at Bruntál)	Unmarried	1406 aged 35–36	Children of John I divided the land. John kept the main Ráciborz and Krnov, and Nicholas was given Bruntál. John lost Krnov in 1388, but recovered it in 1422.
Bruntál remerged in Racibórz
Wenceslaus II, Duke of Opava-Ratibor	1405; First son of John II, Duke of Opava-Ratibor and Helena of Lithuania	1424 – 29 October 1456	Duchy of Racibórz	Margaret of Szamotuł; 1437 four children	29 October 1456 aged 50–51	Children of John II, divided their inheritance.
Nicholas V, Duke of Krnov	1409; Second son of John II, Duke of Opava-Ratibor and Helena of Lithuania	1424 – 22 December 1452	Duchy of Krnov	Margaret Clemm of Ellguth three children Barbara Rockemberg; 1451; Kraków two children	22 December 1452 aged 42–43	Children of John II, divided their inheritance.
Wenceslaus II, Duke of Opava	1397; First son of Přemek I, Duke of Opava and Anna of Lutz	28 September 1433 – 1449	Duchy of Głubczyce	Elisabeth of Kravař; 1420 two children	1449 aged 51–52	Children of Premislaus I divided the land. William and Ernest inherited the duchy of Ziebice in succession, alongside Opava, where they ruled together with their half- brother Nicholas IV (and possibly also Premislaus II). In 1452, after William's death, Ernest and his brothers associated William's sons as co-rulers. Wenceslaus II, another half-brother, inherited a part of Opava centered around Glubczyce. In 1456, Ziebice was annexed to the Podebrady family's patrimony. In 1464, the duchy of Opava was sold to Bohemia.
Nicholas IV	1400; Second son of Premislaus I and Anna of Lutz	28 September 1433 – 1437	Duchy of Opava (at Zlaté Hory)	Unmarried	1437 aged 36–37	
William, Duke of Opava	1410; First son of Přemek I, Duke of Opava and Catherine of Ziębice	28 September 1433 – 15 August 1452	Duchy of Opava (with Duchy of Ziębice since 1443)	Salomea of Častolovice five children	15 August 1452 aged 41–42	
Ernest, Duke of Opava	1415; Second son of Přemek I, Duke of Opava and Catherine of Ziębice	28 September 1433 – 8 March 1456	Duchy of Opava (with Duchy of Ziębice 1452–1456)	Unmarried	1464 aged 48–49	
Przemko II, Duke of Opava	c. 1425; Son of Přemek I, Duke of Opava and Helena of Bosnia	28 September 1433 – 8 March 1456	Duchy of Opava	Unmarried	16 June 1478; Wrocław aged 52–53	
Frederick, Duke of Opava	1440; First son of William and Salomea of Častolovice	15 August 1452 – 8 March 1456	Duchy of Opava	Unmarried	1470 aged 29–30	
Wenceslaus III	1445; Second son of William, Duke of Opava and Salomea of Častolovice	15 August 1452 – 8 March 1456	Duchy of Opava	Unmarried	1474 aged 28–29	
Przemko III, Duke of Opava	1450; Third son of William, Duke of Opava and Salomea of Častolovice	15 August 1452 – 8 March 1456	Duchy of Opava	Unmarried	17 February 1493 aged 42–43	
Zlaté Hory remerged in Opava; Opava pledged to Opole by debt, later transferred in 1464 to Bohemia: annexation to Bohemia; Ziębice was annexed to the Podiebrad family.
John I, Duke of Opava	1420; First son of Wenceslaus II, Duke of Opava and Elisabeth of Kravař	1449–1454	Duchy of Glubczyce (in Fulnek)	Unmarried	1454 aged 59–60	Children of Wenceslaus II divided the land, which was reunited shortly by John III.
John II, Duke of Opava	1425; Second son of Wenceslaus II, Duke of Opava and Elisabeth of Kravař	1449–1485	Duchy of Głubczyce (in Głubczyce proper)	Catherine (d. 1485) no children	1485 aged 59–60	Children of Wenceslaus II divided the land, which was reunited shortly by John III.
Fulnek remerged in Glubczyce
Barbara Rockemberg	c.1410? ? Rockemberg?	1452 – November 1463	Krnov (at Pszczyna)	Wilhelm Willandt no children Jerzy Orient one child Nicholas V 1451; Kraków two children	November 1463 aged 52–53	Heirs of Nicholas V. Barbara, Nicholas' widow, inherited a dower seat and the position of regent for her stepsons, who inherited the main duchy and divided it after attaining majority. In 1474, John lost the main duchy (later claimed by his sister) but kept some towns for himself.
Regency of Barbara Rockemberg (1452–1462)						Heirs of Nicholas V. Barbara, Nicholas' widow, inherited a dower seat and the position of regent for her stepsons, who inherited the main duchy and divided it after attaining majority. In 1474, John lost the main duchy (later claimed by his sister) but kept some towns for himself.
John IV, Duke of Krnov	1440; First son of Nicholas V, Duke of Krnov and Margaret Clemm of Ellguth	1452–1483	Krnov (at Krnov proper until 1474; at Wodzisław Śląski in since 1474)	Unmarried	1483 aged 42–43	Heirs of Nicholas V. Barbara, Nicholas' widow, inherited a dower seat and the position of regent for her stepsons, who inherited the main duchy and divided it after attaining majority. In 1474, John lost the main duchy (later claimed by his sister) but kept some towns for himself.
Wenceslaus III, Duke of Rybnik	1442; Second son of Nicholas V, Duke of Krnov and Margaret Clemm of Ellguth	1452–1478	Krnov (at Rybnik)	Unmarried	1478 aged 35–36	Heirs of Nicholas V. Barbara, Nicholas' widow, inherited a dower seat and the position of regent for her stepsons, who inherited the main duchy and divided it after attaining majority. In 1474, John lost the main duchy (later claimed by his sister) but kept some towns for himself.
Pszczyna annexed to Krnov; Krnov temporarily annexed to Bohemia (1474–1490); Rybnik and Wodzisław Śląski definitely annexed to Bohemia
Regency of Margaret of Szamotuł (1456–1464)						
John V the Younger	1446; Son of Wenceslaus II, Duke of Opava-Ratibor and Margaret of Szamotuł	29 October 1456 – 14 April 1493	Duchy of Racibórz	Magdalena of Opole; 13 January 1478; Opole four children	14 April 1493 aged 46–47	
Anna	c. 1430; Daughter of Wenceslaus II, Duke of Opava and Elisabeth of Kravař	1485	Duchy of Głubczyce	Jan Zajic of Hasenburg (d. 1485) no children	29 April 1478 or 15 May 1505 aged 74–75?	Traditionally dead in 1478, the duchy, without heirs, would have been returned to Bohemia. However, according to other sources, she died in 1505, which opens the possibility of her claiming the duchy.
Głubczyce annexed to Bohemia
Barbara	1445; Daughter of Nicholas V, Duke of Krnov and Margaret Clemm of Ellguth	1490 – 27 April 1510	Duchy of Krnov	John IV, Duke of Oświęcim; 1475 one child	27 April 1510 aged 64–65	Claimed (and ruled, effectively) her family's duchy from 1490, co-ruling with her son-in-law since 1493
Krnov annexed to Oswiecim (1510–1524) and later sold to Brandenburg (see table above)
Regency of Magdalena of Opole (1493–1499)						Children of John V, ruled jointly. In 1521, after the childless brothers' death, the duchy returned to Opole.
Nicholas VI	1478; First son of John V and Magdalena of Opole	14 April 1493 – 3 November 1506	Duchy of Racibórz	Unmarried	3 November 1506; Kraków aged 27–28	Children of John V, ruled jointly. In 1521, after the childless brothers' death, the duchy returned to Opole.
John VI	1484; Second son of John V and Magdalena of Opole	14 April 1493 – December 1506	Duchy of Racibórz	Unmarried	December 1506 aged 21–22	Children of John V, ruled jointly. In 1521, after the childless brothers' death, the duchy returned to Opole.
Valentin the Hunchback	1485; Third son of John V and Magdalena of Opole	14 April 1493 – 13 November 1521	Duchy of Racibórz	Unmarried	13 November 1521; Racibórz aged 35–36	Children of John V, ruled jointly. In 1521, after the childless brothers' death, the duchy returned to Opole.
Racibórz reunited with Opole

=== Podiebrad, Dukes of Silesia ===
==== Partitions of Silesia under the Podiebrad dynasty ====
			Part of Piast dynasty property
County of Kladsko (1471–1501)	Duchy of Ziębice (1456–1569)		Part of Piast dynasty property
County of Kladsko (1471–1501)	Duchy of Ziębice (1456–1569)		Duchy of Oleśnica (1498–1686)
Annexed to the Hardegg family property	Duchy of Ziębice (1456–1569)		Duchy of Oleśnica (1498–1686)
Annexed to the Hardegg family property		Duchy of Bierutów (1536–1587)	Duchy of Oleśnica (1498–1686)
Annexed to the Hardegg family property	Annexed to the Holy Roman; Empire	Duchy of Bierutów (1536–1587)	Duchy of Oleśnica (1498–1686)

==== Table of rulers ====
Ruler	Born	Reign	Ruling part	Consort	Death	Notes
George of Poděbrady	23 April 1420; Poděbrady Castle; Son of Victor of Kunštát and Poděbrady and Anna of Wartenberg	8 March 1456 – 22 March 1471	Duchy of Ziębice	Kunigunde of Sternberg; 1441 three children Joanna of Rožmitál; 1450 four children	22 March 1471; Prague aged 50	Also King of Bohemia.
Victor, Duke of Münsterberg	29 May 1443; Poděbrady Castle; Second son of George of Poděbrady and Kunigunde of Sternberg	22 March 1471 – 1485	Duchy of Ziębice (at Opava; in Pszczyna until 1480)	Margaret Ptáček of Pirkstein; 1463 one child Sophie of Cieszyn; 1464 three children Elena-Margaret Palaiologina of Montferrat; 1480 three children	30 August 1500; Český Těšín aged 57	Children of George, divided their inheritance. Victor also inherited Pszczyna, but gave it to his daughter and son-in-law in 1480
Henry I, Duke of Münsterberg-Oels	15 May 1448; Poděbrady Castle; Third son of George of Poděbrady and Kunigunde of Sternberg	22 March 1471 – 24 June 1498	Duchy of Ziębice	Ursula of Brandenburg, Duchess of Münsterberg-Oels; 9 September 1467; Cheb eight children	24 June 1498; Kłodzko aged 50	Children of George, divided their inheritance. Victor also inherited Pszczyna, but gave it to his daughter and son-in-law in 1480
Henry the Younger of Poděbrady	18 May 1452; Prague; Son of George (I) and Johana of Rožmitál	22 March 1471 – 1 July 1492	County of Kłodzko	Catherine of Thuringia; 26 February 1471 one child	1 July 1492; Poděbrady Castle aged 40	Children of George, divided their inheritance. Victor also inherited Pszczyna, but gave it to his daughter and son-in-law in 1480
Opava annexed to Hungary
Kłodzko briefly annexed to Ziębice
Johanna of Poděbrady	1463; Poděbrady Castle; Daughter of Victor, Duke of Münsterberg and Margaret Ptáček of Pirkstein	15 February 1480 – 24 July 1496	Duchy of Ziębice (in Pszczyna)	Casimir II, Duke of Cieszyn; 15 February 1480 two children	24 July 1496 aged 32–33	She was given Pszczyna possibly at the time of her wedding with the Duke of Cieszyn.
Pszczyna annexed to Cieszyn
Albert I, Duke of Münsterberg-Oels	3 August 1468; Kunětická hora Castle; First son of Henry I, Duke of Münsterberg-Oels and Ursula of Brandenburg, Duchess of Münsterberg-Oels	24 June 1498 – 5 May 1501	County of Kłodzko	Salomea of Głogów-Żagań (1475–1514); 1487 one child	12 July 1511; Prostějov aged 42	Children of Henry I, divided their inheritance. In 1501, due to financial problems, Kłodzko was sold to the Hardegg family.
George I of Münsterberg	2 October 1470; Litice Castle; Second son of Henry I, Duke of Münsterberg-Oels and Ursula of Brandenburg, Duchess of Münsterberg-Oels	24 June 1498 – 10 November 1502	Duchy of Oleśnica	Hedwig of Głogów-Żagań (1477–1524); 7 January 1488; Głogów no children	10 November 1502; Oleśnica aged 32	Children of Henry I, divided their inheritance. In 1501, due to financial problems, Kłodzko was sold to the Hardegg family.
Charles I, Duke of Münsterberg-Oels	2/4 May 1476; Kłodzko; Fourth son of Henry I, Duke of Münsterberg-Oels and Ursula of Brandenburg, Duchess of Münsterberg-Oels	24 June 1498 – 31 May 1536	Duchy of Ziębice	Anna of Sagan; 7 January 1488; Głogów twelve children	31 May 1536; Ząbkowice Śląskie aged 60	Children of Henry I, divided their inheritance. In 1501, due to financial problems, Kłodzko was sold to the Hardegg family.
Kłodzko sold to the Hardegg family
Oleśnica was briefly remerged in Ziębice
Joachim of Münsterberg-Oels	18 January 1503; Oleśnica; Second son of Charles I, Duke of Münsterberg-Oels and Anna of Sagan	31 May 1536 – 1542	Duchy of Ziębice	Unmarried	27 December 1562; Wrocław aged 59	Children of Charles I divided their inheritance. In 1542, Joachim and John pledged their duchy to the Duchy of Legnica and it was then lost to Hungary; Joachim retired to the clergy. However, John, after inheriting his brother George's duchy in 1553, managed to recover the lost Ziębice in 1559.
John, Duke of Münsterberg-Oels	4 November 1509; Oleśnica; Fourth son of Charles I, Duke of Münsterberg-Oels and Anna of Sagan	31 May 1536 – 1542 1559 – 28 February 1565	Duchy of Ziębice	Christina Catherine of Schidlowitz; 20 February 1536 one child Margarete of Brunswick-Wolfenbüttel; 8 September 1561; Oleśnica no children	28 February 1565; Oleśnica aged 56	Children of Charles I divided their inheritance. In 1542, Joachim and John pledged their duchy to the Duchy of Legnica and it was then lost to Hungary; Joachim retired to the clergy. However, John, after inheriting his brother George's duchy in 1553, managed to recover the lost Ziębice in 1559.
Henry II, Duke of Münsterberg-Oels	29 March 1507; Oleśnica; Third son of Charles I, Duke of Münsterberg-Oels and Anna of Sagan	31 May 1536 – 2 August 1548	Duchy of Bierutów	Margaret of Pernštejn; 7 February 1529 no children Margaret of Mecklenburg-Schwerin (1515–1586); 12 November 1537 seven children	2 August 1548; Bierutów aged 45	Children of Charles I divided their inheritance. In 1542, Joachim and John pledged their duchy to the Duchy of Legnica and it was then lost to Hungary; Joachim retired to the clergy. However, John, after inheriting his brother George's duchy in 1553, managed to recover the lost Ziębice in 1559.
George II, Duke of Münsterberg-Oels	30 April 1512; Oleśnica; Fifth son of Charles I, Duke of Münsterberg-Oels and Anna of Sagan	31 May 1536 – 13 January 1553	Duchy of Oleśnica	Elizabeth Kostka of Postupitz no children	31 May 1536; Oleśnica aged 40	Children of Charles I divided their inheritance. In 1542, Joachim and John pledged their duchy to the Duchy of Legnica and it was then lost to Hungary; Joachim retired to the clergy. However, John, after inheriting his brother George's duchy in 1553, managed to recover the lost Ziębice in 1559.
Oleśnica was briefly remerged in Ziębice
Regency of John, Duke of Münsterberg-Oels (1548–1565)						Heirs of Henry II. Co-ruled jointly in Bierutów until 1569, when the death of their cousin Charles Christopher made them divide their possessions: Henry kept Bierutów, and Charles inherited Oleśnica. However, Henry was indebted and had to sell the Bierutów to the von Schindel family. Charles recovered it in 1604.
Henry III, Duke of Münsterberg-Oels	29 April 1542; Oleśnica; First son of Henry II, Duke of Münsterberg-Oels and Margaret of Mecklenburg-Schwerin	2 August 1548 – 1574	Duchy of Bierutów	Magdalena Meseritsch of Lomnitz no children	10 April 1587; Oleśnica aged 44	Heirs of Henry II. Co-ruled jointly in Bierutów until 1569, when the death of their cousin Charles Christopher made them divide their possessions: Henry kept Bierutów, and Charles inherited Oleśnica. However, Henry was indebted and had to sell the Bierutów to the von Schindel family. Charles recovered it in 1604.
Karl II, Duke of Münsterberg-Oels	29 March 1507; Oleśnica; Fourth son of Henry II, Duke of Münsterberg-Oels and Margaret of Mecklenburg-Schwerin	2 August 1548 – 28 January 1617	Duchy of Oleśnica (in Bierutów until 1574 and from 1604; in Oleśnica proper since 1569)	Catherine Berka of Dubá; 17 September 1570; Moravská Třebová two children Elisabeth Magdalena of Brzeg; 30 September 1585 eight children	28 January 1617; Oleśnica aged 71	Heirs of Henry II. Co-ruled jointly in Bierutów until 1569, when the death of their cousin Charles Christopher made them divide their possessions: Henry kept Bierutów, and Charles inherited Oleśnica. However, Henry was indebted and had to sell the Bierutów to the von Schindel family. Charles recovered it in 1604.
Between 1574 and 1604, Bierutów belonged to the von Schindel family.
Charles Christopher	22 May 1545; Oleśnica; Son of John, Duke of Münsterberg-Oels and Christina Catherine of Schidlowitz	28 February 1565 – 17 March 1569	Duchy of Ziębice	Unmarried	17 March 1569; Oleśnica aged 23	After his death, his domains were divided; while Ziębice merged in the Holy Roman Empire, Oleśnica was inherited by the Bierutów line.
Ziębice was annexed to the Holy Roman Empire; Oleśnica was inherited by the Bierutów line
Henry Wenceslaus, Duke of Oels-Bernstadt	7 October 1592; Oleśnica; Third son of Karl II, Duke of Münsterberg-Oels and Elisabeth Magdalena of Brzeg	28 January 1617 – 21 August 1639	Duchy of Oleśnica (in Bierutów until 1574 and from 1604; in Oleśnica proper since 1569)	Anna Magdalena of the Palatinate-Veldenz; 7 November 1617; Oleśnica eight children Anna Ursula of Reibnitz (1616 – 1 January 1657); 26 August 1636 (morganatic) three children	21 August 1639; Bierutów aged 46	Heirs of Charles II, divided their inheritance.
Karl Friedrich I, Duke of Münsterberg-Oels	18 October 1593; Oleśnica; Fourth son of Karl II, Duke of Münsterberg-Oels and Elisabeth Magdalena of Brzeg	28 January 1617 – 31 May 1647	Duchy of Oleśnica	Anna Sophia of Saxe-Altenburg; 24 November 1618; Oleśnica one child Sophia Magdalena of Brzeg; 2 December 1642; Wrocław no children	31 May 1647; Oleśnica aged 53	Heirs of Charles II, divided their inheritance.
Bierutów remerged in Oleśnica
Elisabeth Marie, Duchess of Oels	11 May 1625; Oleśnica; Daughter of Karl Friedrich I, Duke of Münsterberg-Oels and Anna Sophia of Saxe-Altenburg	31 May 1647 – 17 March 1686	Duchy of Oleśnica	Silvius I Nimrod, Duke of Württemberg-Oels; 1 May 1647; Oleśnica seven children	17 March 1686; Oleśnica aged 60	Last heiress of the Podiebrad family. After her death, her duchy was annexed to Württemberg.
Oleśnica annexed to Württemberg.

=== The Ecclesiastical Duchy of Nysa ===
Established in 1290 by High Duke Henry Probus, held by the Bishops of Wrocław

- 1302–1319 Henry of Wiebrzno
- 1326–1341 Nankier
- 1342–1376 Przecław of Pogarell
- 1382–1417 Wenceslaus II of Legnica
- 1417–1447 Konrad IV the Elder
- 1447–1456 Peter II Nowak
- 1456–1467 Jošt of Rožmberk
- 1468–1482 Rudolf of Rüdesheim
- 1482–1506 Jan IV Roth
- 1506–1520 Jan V Thurzo
- 1520–1539 Jacob of Salza
- 1539–1562 Balthazar of Promnitz
- 1562–1574 Caspar of Logau
- 1574–1585 Martin Gerstmann
- 1585–1596 Andreas Jerin
- 1596–1599 Bonaventura Hahn
- 1599–1600 Paul Albert of Radolfzell
- 1600–1608 Jan VI of Sitsch
- 1608–1624 Charles of Austria, Bishop of Wroclaw, son of Charles II, Archduke of Austria
- 1625–1655 Karol Ferdynand Vasa, Duke of Opole from 1648
- 1656–1662 Leopold Wilhelm of Habsburg
- 1663–1664 Archduke Charles Joseph of Austria, also Grand Master of the Teutonic Order from 1662
- 1665–1671 Sebastian von Rostock
- 1671–1682 Frederick of Hesse-Darmstadt
- 1683–1732 Franz Ludwig von Pfalz-Neuburg
- 1732–1747 Philipp Ludwig von Sinzendorf

A major part annexed by the Kingdom of Prussia after the First Silesian War in 1742.

- 1747–1795 Philipp Gotthard von Schaffgotsch
- 1795–1817 Joseph Christian Franz zu Hohenlohe-Waldenburg-Bartenstein

Prussian part secularised in 1810.

- 1823–1832 Emanuel von Schimonsky
- 1835–1840 Leopold von Sedlnitzky
- 1843–1844 Joseph Knauer
- 1845–1850 Melchior von Diepenbrock

Theocracy was abolished in 1850.

== See also ==
- List of Polish rulers
- Piast dynasty
- Dukes of Masovia
- Dukes of Greater Poland
- Dukes of Sieradz-Łęczyca

== Bibliography ==
- Neue deutsche Biographie, Berlin 2001, Bd.: 20, pp. 403–407
- Meyers Großes Konversations-Lexikon, Leipzig 1905–1909, Bd.: 17, pp. 845–847
