= Konrad the White =

Konrad the White may refer to:

- Konrad VII the White (aft. 1396 – 1452)
- Konrad X the White (1420–1492)
