= Conrad IX =

Conrad IX or Konrad IX may refer to:

- Konrad IX of Weinsberg (died 1448), imperial chamberlain
- Konrad IX the Black (died 1471), duke of Oleśnica
