= Margareta of Rawa =

Margareta of Rawa (Polish: Małgorzata Rawska; 1436/40 - betw. 5 May 1483/1 September 1485), was a member of the House of Piast and by marriage Duchess of Oleśnica, Koźle and half of Bytom.

She was the only child of Siemowit V, Duke of Rawa by his wife Margareta, daughter of Jan II of Iron, Duke of Racibórz.

== Life ==
After her father's early death in 1442, Margareta remained under the care of her mother, while her paternal uncle Władysław I of Płock exercised her legal guardianship. In 1444 Władysław I married with Anna, daughter of Konrad V Kantner, Duke of Oleśnica, and possibly this was instrumental by a marriage between Margareta and Anna's older brother Konrad IX the Black. The wedding took place between 1447 and 1453. The union only produced a daughter, Barbara.

Konrad IX died on 14 August 1471. In his will, he left Oleśnica and Bierutów to Margareta as her dower. She ruled until 1475, when she was deposed by her brother-in-law Konrad X the White, who put her daughter Barbara as the new ruler over Oleśnica and Bierutów under his tutelage until she was also deposed by him in 1478. Barbara died one year later. Margareta never remarried and survived her daughter by almost six years.

== Notes ==
Margareta of Rawa House of Piast Born: 1441 Died: c. 1 September 1485
| Preceded by Konrad IX the Black | Duchess of Oleśnica; 1471–1475 | Succeeded by Barbara |
