= Margarete of Brunswick-Wolfenbüttel =

Duchess of Münsterberg-Oels (1516–1580)

- Born: 26 August 1516
- Died: 28 November 1580; Stauffenburg
- Noble family: House of Guelph
- Spouse: John, Duke of Münsterberg-Oels
- Father: Henry II, Duke of Brunswick-Wolfenbüttel
- Mother: Maria of Württemberg

Margarete of Brunswick-Wolfenbüttel (26 August 1516 – 28 October 1580, Stauffenburg) was a princess of Brunswick-Wolfenbüttel by birth and by marriage Duchess of Münsterberg, Oels and Bernstadt.

== Life ==
Margaret was the eldest child of the Duke Henry II of Brunswick-Wolfenbüttel (1489–1568) from his first marriage to Maria of Württemberg (1496–1541), daughter of Count Henry of Württemberg.

She married on 8 September 1561 in Oleśnica Duke John of Münsterberg and Oels (1509–1565). With permission from the Estates, the castle and lordship of Frankenstein were reserved for Margarete as her Wittum. After four years of childless marriage, John died and Margarete's stepson Charles Christopher sold off Frankenstein. This caused a dispute between Margarete and Charles Christopher and his heirs, which was settled on 25 April 1577 by the intervention of Emperor Rudolf II in his capacity as King of Bohemia.

In the meantime, Margarete had returned to Brunswick. She lived at the court of her brother Julius until in 1569 he gave her the lordship and castle of Stauffenburg, where she devoted herself to the care of the poor and the sick and the needy.

She died on 28 October 1580 in Stauffenburg.

== Ancestors ==
Ancestors of Margarete of Brunswick-Wolfenbüttel

8. William II, Duke of Brunswick-Calenberg-Göttingen
4. Henry IV, Duke of Brunswick-Lüneburg
9. Elizabeth of Stolberg-Wernigerode
2. Henry V, Duke of Brunswick-Lüneburg
10. Eric II, Duke of Pomerania
5. Catherine of Pomerania
11. Sophia of Pomerania-Stolp
1. Margarete of Brunswick-Wolfenbüttel
12. Ulrich V, Count of Württemberg
6. Henry, Count of Württemberg
13. Elisabeth of Bavaria-Landshut
3. Maria of Württemberg
14. John IV, Count of Salm-Obersalm
7. Eva of Salm
15. Margaret of Sierck

== Bibliography ==
- Johann Samuel Ersch: Allgemeine Encyklopädie der Wissenschaften und Künste, part 2, vol. 21, Gleditsch, 1842, p. 350
