= Barbara of Oleśnica =

Barbara of Oleśnica (Polish: Barbara oleśnicka; 1465–1479) was a member of the House of Piast and Duchess of Oleśnica during 1475–1478.

She was the only child of Konrad IX the Black, Duke of Oleśnica by his wife Margareta, daughter of Duke Siemowit V of Rawa.

== Life ==
After the death of her father (1471), she became the potential heiress of Oleśnica and perhaps all the duchy; for this, she remained under the care of her mother and the formal guardianship of her childless uncle Konrad X the White.

In the summer of 1472 Konrad X engaged her with Albert, the eldest son of Henry I the Elder, Duke of Ziębice. On this occasion, Konrad X sold to Henry I for 9,000 guilders the towns of Koźle, Toszek and Bytom. However, soon the betrothal was broken; Albert eventually married with Salome, daughter of Jan II the Mad, Duke of Głogów, in 1487.

In 1475, Margareta of Rawa was deposed by Konrad X from the effective government over Oleśnica and Bierutów (which were given to her as her dower) and replaced by her own daughter Barbara, who remained as a sovereign duchess (but under the tutelage of her uncle), until 1478, when she was also deposed by Konrad X, who took the direct control over Oleśnica.

The last mention of Barbara was by 30 November 1479. She probably died shortly afterwards.

Barbara of Oleśnica House of Piast Born: 1465 Died: 30 November 1479
Preceded by Margareta	Duchess of Oleśnica; 1475–1478	Succeeded by Konrad X the White
