= Konrad IX the Black =

- Duke of Oleśnica, Koźle
- Coat-of-arms of Silesia
- Born: c. 1415
- Died: 14 August 1471
- Noble family: Silesian Piasts of Oleśnica
- Spouse: Margareta of Rawa
- Issue: Barbara of Oleśnica
- Father: Konrad V Kantner
- Mother: Margareta

Konrad IX the Black (Polish: Konrad IX Czarny) (c. 1415 – 14 August 1471) was a duke of Oleśnica, Koźle, half of Bytom and half of Ścinawa since 1450 (with his brothers as co-rulers), and since 1452 sole ruler over Oleśnica, Koźle and half of Bytom.

He was the eldest son of Konrad V Kantner, Duke of Oleśnica by his wife Margareta.

== Life ==
After his father's death in 1439 Konrad IX and his younger brother Konrad X were excluded from the government by their uncle Konrad VII the White, who reigned until 1450, when was deposed by both Konrad IX and Konrad X, who co-ruled for the next two years, until 1452, when was made the division of the Duchy. Konrad IX obtain Oleśnica, Koźle and half of Bytom.

During the wars between Bohemia and Hungary, he initially supported King George of Poděbrady and paid homage to him with his brother Konrad X in 1459 in exchange for the confirmation of the possession of their father's Duchy; however, when the Hungarian troops entered in Silesia, Konrad IX and Konrad X repudied his alliance with Bohemia and paid homage to King Matthias Corvinus.

In 1459 Konrad IX buy the half of the Duchy of Bytom who belonged to the Cieszyn branch by the amount of 1,700 fines. Thanks to this, he could reunificated the whole Duchy of Bytom after almost 104 years.

== Marriage and issue ==
By 1453 Konrad IX married with Margareta (b. 1441 – d. by 1 September 1485), daughter of Duke Siemowit V of Rawa. They had one daughter:

1. Barbara (b. 1465 – d. 30 November 1479).

On his death, Konrad IX was succeeded by his brother in all his lands except Oleśnica and Bierutów, who were leave to his wife Margareta as her dower.

Preceded by Konrad VII the White	Duke of Oleśnica; 1450–1471 with Konrad X (1450-1452)	Succeeded by Margareta
Preceded by Konrad VII the White	Duke of Koźle; 1450–1471 with Konrad X (1450-1452)	Succeeded by Konrad X the White
Preceded by Konrad VII the White	Duke of Ścinawa (1/2); 1450–1452 with Konrad X	Succeeded by Konrad X the White
Preceded by Konrad VII the White	Duke of Bytom (1/2); 1450–1459 with Konrad X (1450-1452)	Reunification
Preceded by Wenceslaus I	Duke of Bytom (1/2); 1459	Reunification
Preceded by —	Duke of Bytom; 1459–1471	Succeeded by Konrad X the White
