= Konrad X the White =

Silesian duke of the Piast dynasty

- duke of Oleśnica, Koźle
- Coat-of-arms of Silesian Piasts
- Born: 1420
- Died: 21 September 1492 (aged 71–72)
- Noble family: Silesian Piasts of Oleśnica
- Spouse: Dorothea Reynkenberg
- Father: Konrad V Kantner
- Mother: Margareta

Konrad X the White (Polish: Konrad X Biały) (1420 – 21 September 1492) was a duke of Oleśnica, Koźle, and half of both Bytom and Ścinawa during 1450–1452 (with his brother as co-rulers), since 1452 sole ruler over half of Ścinawa, during 1471–1472 sole ruler over Koźle and whole Bytom, and since 1478 sole ruler over Oleśnica.

He was the second son of Konrad V Kantner, Duke of Oleśnica, by his wife Margareta.

== Life ==
After his father's death in 1439, Konrad X and his older brother Konrad IX the Black were excluded from the government by their uncle Konrad VII the White, who ruled until 1450, when Konrad X and Konrad IX deposed him and took over the Duchy as co-rulers; however, two years later, in 1452, they decided to divide their domains. Konrad X obtained half of Ścinawa.

During the wars between Bohemia and Hungary, he initially supported King George of Poděbrady and paid homage to him with his brother Konrad IX in 1459 in exchange for the confirmation of the possession of their father's Duchy; however, when the Hungarian troops entered in Silesia, Konrad X and Konrad IX repudiated his alliance with Bohemia and paid homage to King Matthias Corvinus.

After the death of his brother in 1471, Konrad X reunited the entire duchy in his hands, except Oleśnica, which was the dower of his sister-in-law Margareta of Rawa and later ruled by his niece Barbara. In view of his deep debts, he sold his Upper Silesian domains to Duke Henry I the Older of Ziębice.

In 1472, Koźle and Bytom were annexed by the Kingdom of Bohemia, and three years later, in 1475, Konrad X the White managed to deprive Margareta of Oleśnica of effective rule over Oleśnica. The duchy then passed to her daughter Barbara of Oleśnica, who remained under the tutelage of her uncle until 1478, when she was also deposed by Konrad X, who finally took control over the land.

When Konrad X was unable to manage his debts, he attempted to sell his lands to the rulers of Electorate of Saxony, which prompted the intervention of King Matthias Corvinus and the Teutonic Order in 1480. Ultimately, Konrad X reached a settlement with the Hungarian king, under which he recognized him as King of Bohemia and agreed to join the coalition of Olomouc.

In 1488, he attempted to invalidate his alliance with King Matthias by joining in a coalition with Jan II the Mad, Duke of Głogów and Henry I the Older, but was defeated in 1489 by the Hungarian forces. Then he was forced to give up the Uraz Castle to the royal treasure. After the death of King Matthias in 1490 he could recover the full government over Oleśnica, Syców and Wąsosz.

Konrad X married with Dorothea Reynkenberg (d. 6 January 1471), daughter of Nikolaus (or Nikodemus) Reynkenberg, a coppersmith. According to the standards of the House of Piast, the marriage was considered morganatic, and Dorothea was forbidden to assume the titles and rank of her husband. They had no children.

With him, the Oleśnica branch of the Piast dynasty became extinct. Half of Ścinawa was taken by Duke Casimir II of Cieszyn and Oleśnica was obtained by Henry I the Older.

== Notes ==
Preceded by Konrad VII the White	Duke of Oleśnica; 1450–1452 with Konrad IX	Succeeded by Konrad IX the Black
Preceded by Konrad VII the White	Duke of Koźle; 1450–1452 with Konrad IX	Succeeded by Konrad IX the Black
Preceded by Konrad VII the White	Duke of Bytom (1/2); 1450–1452 with Konrad IX	Succeeded by Konrad IX the Black
Preceded by Konrad VII the White	Duke of Ścinawa (1/2); 1450–1492 with Konrad IX (1450-1452)	Succeeded by Casimir II
Preceded by Konrad IX the Black	Duke of Koźle; 1471–1472	Vacant Title next held by Jan II the Good
Preceded by Konrad IX the Black	Duke of Bytom; 1471–1472	Vacant Title next held by Jan II the Good
Preceded by Barbara	Duke of Oleśnica; 1478–1492	Succeeded by Henry I the Elder
