= Duke of Opole =

Coat of arms of the Opole Piasts c. 1389

The following is a list of monarchs who used the title Duke of Opole and controlled the city and the surrounding area either directly or indirectly (see also Duchy of Opole).

== Piast dynasty ==
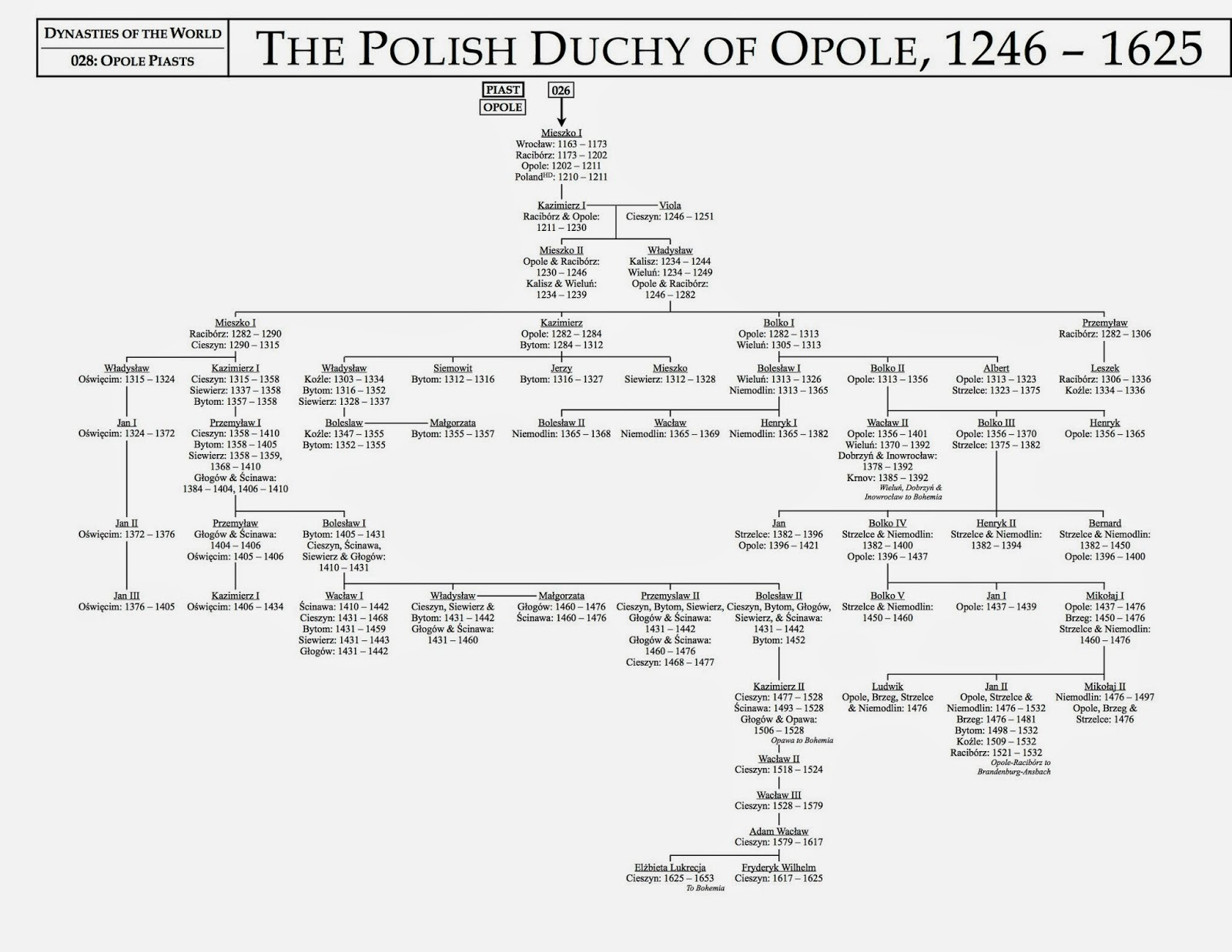

- 1163-1173 Bolesław I the Tall (Bolesław Wysoki), Duke of Silesia at Wrocław
  - 1173-1201 Jarosław Opolski, son, first Duke of Opole
- 1201 Bolesław I the Tall, again
- 1201-1202 Henry I the Bearded (Henryk I Brodaty), son of Bolesław, ceded Opole to his uncle
- 1202-1211 Mieszko I Tanglefoot (Mieszko I Plątonogi), Duke of Racibórz
- 1211-1230 Casimir I (Kazimierz I), son
- 1230-1246 Mieszko II the Fat (Mieszko II Otyły), son, followed by his brother
  - 1246-1281 Władysław I
- 1281-1313 Bolko I, son of Władysław
- 1313-1356 Bolko II, son, jointly with his brother
  - 1313-1323 Albert
- 1356-1401 Władysław II, son of Bolko II, jointly with his brothers
  - 1356-1370 Bolko III and
  - 1356-1365 Henry
- 1396-1437 Bolko IV, son of Bolko III, jointly with his brother
  - 1396-1400 Bernard
- 1437-1476 Nicholas I (Mikołaj I), son of Bolko IV, jointly with his brother
  - 1437-1439 Jan I
- 1476-1532 Jan II the Good (Jan II Dobry), son of Nicholas I, jointly with his brothers
  - 1476 Louis and,
  - 1476 Nicholas II (Mikołaj II)

== Various dynasties ==
- 1532-1543 possession of Brandenburg
- 1543-1549 Georg Friedrich of Brandenburg Hohenzollern (Jerzy Fryderyk Brandenburski)
- 1549-1551 Ferdinand of Austria (Ferdynand Austriacki)
- 1551-1556 Isabelle and Sigismund Zapolya (Izabela and Zygmunt Zapolya)
- 1556-1558 Georg Friedrich of Brandenburg Hohenzollern (Jerzy Fryderyk Brandenburski)
- from 1558 possession of the Habsburgs of as kings of Bohemia, sometimes governed by dukes from other dynasties

== Princes of Transylvania ==
- 1597-1598 Sigismund Bathory (Zygmunt Batory) - Nephew of Polish king
- 1622-1625 Gabriel Bethlen (Gabriel Bethlen)

== House of Vasa ==
- 1645-1648 Wladislaus IV of Poland (Władysław IV Wasa) - King of Poland
- 1648-1655 Charles Ferdinand Vasa (Karol Ferdynand Waza)
- 1655-1666 John II of Poland (Jan Kazimierz Waza) - King of Poland

== House of Habsburg ==
- 1666-1742 possession of the House of Habsburg as kings of Bohemia
