= Bolko =

Bolko is a given name. Notable people with the name include:

- Bolko I of Opole (1258–1313), Duke of Opole from 1282, Niemodlin and Strzelce Opolskie until his death
- Bolko I the Strict (1252–1301), Duke of Lwówek, Jawor and of Świdnica-Ziębice
- Bolko II of Opole (1300–1356), Duke of Opole from 1313
- Bolko II of Ziębice (1300–1341), Duke of Jawor-Lwówek-Świdnica-Ziębice, of Świdnica-Ziębice, then of Ziębice
- Bolko II the Small (c. 1312 – 1368), the last independent Duke of the Piast dynasty in Silesia
- Bolko III of Ziębice (1348–1410), Duke of Münsterberg and ruler over Gleiwitz
- Bolko III of Strzelce (1337–1382), Duke of Opole and Duke of Strzelce
- Bolko IV of Opole (1363–1437), Duke of Strzelce and Niemodlin, then Duke of Opole
- Bolko V the Hussite (1400–1460), Duke of Opole, then ruler over Głogówek and Prudnik, Duke of Strzelce and Niemodlin, ruler over Olesno
- Bolko von Richthofen (1899–1983), German archaeologist and a distant relative of the family of Manfred von Richthofen, the "Red Baron"
