= Vladislaus II of Opole =

14th-century Hungarian and Polish nobleman

- Duke of Opole
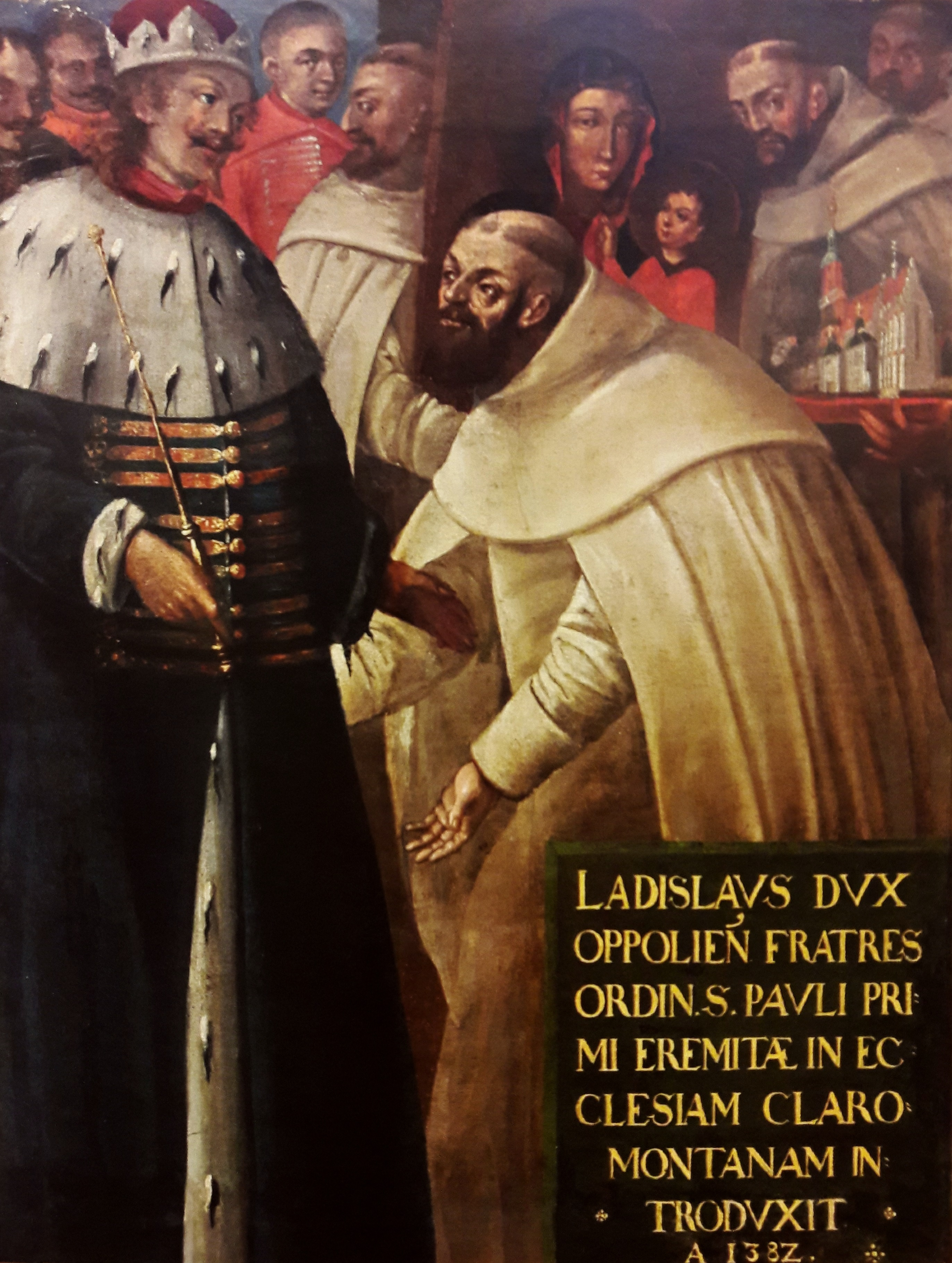
- Vladislaus depicted in a 17th-century mosaic

Palatine of Hungary
- Reign: 1367–1372
- Predecessor: Nicholas Kont
- Successor: Emeric Lackfi
- Native name: Władysław Opolczyk
- Born: c. 1332
- Died: 18 May 1401; Opole, Duchy of Opole
- Noble family: Silesian Piasts of Opole
- Spouses: Elisabeth of Wallachia; Euphemia of Masovia
- Issue: Kinga; Elisabeth [Agnes] Katharina; Hedwig; Euphemia
- Father: Bolko II of Opole
- Mother: Elisabeth of Świdnica

Vladislaus II of Opole (Polish: Władysław Opolczyk, German: Wladislaus von Oppeln, Hungarian: Oppelni László, Ukrainian: Владислав Опольський; ca. 1332 – 18 May 1401), nicknamed Naderspan, was Duke of Opole from 1356, Count palatine of Hungary (1367–1372), Duke of Wieluń (1370–1392), Governor of Ruthenia (1372–1378), Count palatine of Poland (1378) as well as Duke of Dobrzyń, Inowrocław (1378–1392), Krnov and Kuyavia (1385–1392).

Vladislaus was the eldest son of Duke Bolko II of Opole by his wife Elisabeth, daughter of Duke Bernard of Świdnica.

== Life ==
=== Early years ===
Vladislaus was a descendant of the House of Piast. Little is known about his youth. As a young prince, in order to gain more political experience, he went to Hungary around 1353, where he probably remained until the death of his father (1356). There he also got married.

=== Duke of Opole ===
After Duke Bolko II's death, Vladislaus and his brothers Bolko III and Henry inherited Duchy of Opole (then fiefdom of the Bohemian Crown) as co-rulers; however, the strong personality of Vladislaus soon dominated the whole government and made his brothers to accept a modest part of their inheritance. Bolko III and Henry remained co-Dukes of Opole, but only formally.

=== Cooperation with King Louis I the Great of Hungary ===
The political career of Vladislaus began in the mid 1360s in the Hungarian court of King Louis I. Already in 1364 he took part in the famous Congress of Cracow as part of the Hungarian suite. However, the most important mission of Vladislaus on behalf of King Louis took place two years later (in 1366), when he negotiated conditions of the planned marriage between a niece of the Hungarian ruler and Wenceslaus, son of Emperor Charles IV.

The faithful service to the Hungarian House of Anjou resulted in the appointment of Vladislaus as Count palatine, which made him the most important man in the country after the King. The functions of this post were primarily broad judicial powers, comparable only to those of the King. In this office, Vladislaus showed great commitment and capability; he created the rule of four Congregatio generalis, which handled court cases. However, despite his huge income, the new post in Hungary affected Vladislaus' personal finances.

=== Death of Casimir III the Great. Homage to the Kingdom of Poland ===
During his time as count palatine, Vladislaus did not cease to participate in foreign politics; for example, in 1368 he travelled to Bulgaria. In 1370, after the death of Casimir III the Great, the Duke of Opole actively participated in preparing the succession of King Louis I of Hungary to the Polish throne. As a reward, King Louis gave him the towns of Wieluń and Częstochowa.

By that time, Vladislaus' brother Bolko III had inherited Strzelce Opolskie from their uncle Albert and with this, the Duke of Opole could maintain the sole government over his domains (the youngest brother, Henry, died in 1365 without issue).

In 1371 Vladislaus led an armed expedition against the Crown of Bohemia (causing terrible devastation of Moravia); however, the following year Vladislaus headed a mediation mission to resolve the dispute between Emperor (also Bohemian King) Charles IV and King Louis I.

=== Lord of Galicia-Volhynia ===
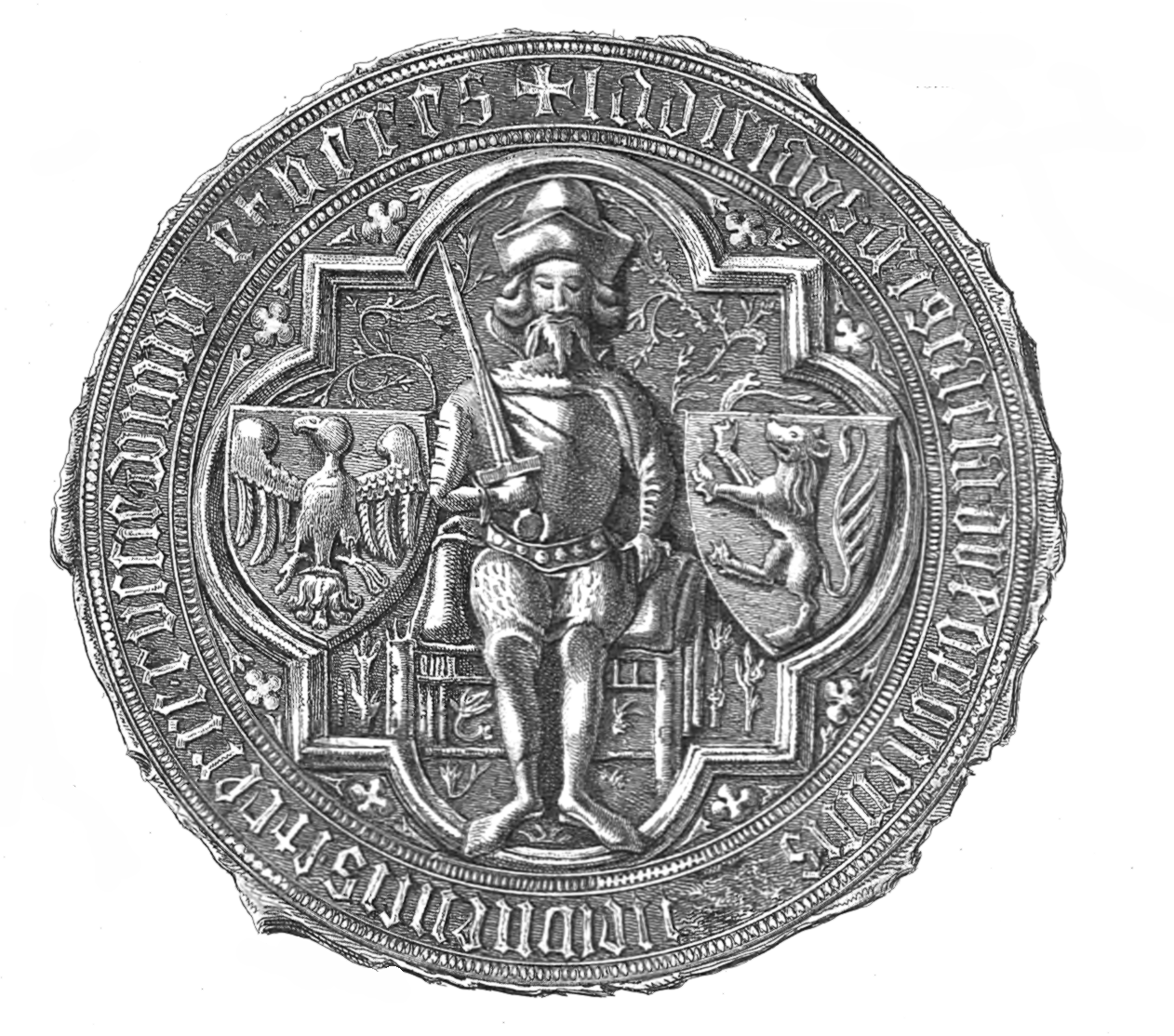
Ducal seal Ladislaus Dei Gracia Dux Opoliensis Wieloniensis et Terre Russie Domin et Heres (ca. 1387)

In October 1372 Vladislaus was unexpectedly dismissed from the office of Count palatine. Although he retained most of his castles and possessions in Hungary, his political influence was significantly curtailed. As a compensation, he was made Governor of the Hungarian-ruled part of the Kingdom of Galicia–Volhynia. In this new position, the Duke of Opole successfully contributed to the economic development of the territories entrusted to him. Vladislaus resided mainly in Lviv, but at the end of his rule, he spent more time in Halych. The only serious conflict during his time was related to his positive attitude to the Eastern Orthodox Church, which caused anger of the local boyars, who were fiercely Catholic.

Probably following Vladislaus's advice, in 1374 King Louis I published a provincial privilege for the Polish nobility (szlachta) in Košice, which ensured the succession of the King's daughters to the Polish throne after his death.

=== Count palatine of Poland and ruler of Kuyavia ===
In 1378 the departure of Queen Elisabeth from Poland to Hungary, forced King Louis to release Vladislaus from his post of Governor and appoint him to the vacant position of Polish Count palatine. But almost immediately Vladislaus had to face the strong resistance from the Polish nobility, dissatisfied with the decision of King Louis to name his daughters as his heirs, and soon was forced to resign.

The Hungarian and Polish ruler compensated Vladislaus with the towns of Dobrzyń Land and a part of Kuyavia (with towns Bydgoszcz, Inowrocław and Gniewkowo). These territories were on the border with the domain of the Teutonic Order, with which Vladislaus established close relations. For example, he allowed the Teutonic knights to prosecute of criminals in his domains.

In Kuyavia, Vladislaus entered in a dispute over finances with the Bishop of Płock, Dobiesław Sówka, resulting in the Duke's excommunication, which, however, was voided a year later by the Archbishop of Gniezno. As a gesture of reconciliation with the Church, Vladislaus founded the Pauline monastery of Our Lady at Jasna Góra in Częstochowa; also, the Duke brought the famous icon of the Black Madonna of Częstochowa, which, according to some old reports, originated in Jerusalem, and travelled via Constantinople and Bełz, to finally reach Częstochowa in August 1382.

The deaths of his brother Bolko III (21 October 1382), who left four minor sons, and one month later (14 September) of Duke Henry of Niemodlin without issue, made it possible to Vladislaus extend his influence to Upper Silesia, as a ruler of Strzelce and Niemodlin (although only as a regent of his nephews) and Głogówek (granted to him one year later, in 1383). The Duke of Opole also supported the Church career of the eldest son of Bolko III, Jan Kropidło, by trying to obtain for him, despite his young age, the position of the Bishop of Poznań.

=== Death of Louis I and relations with Vladislaus II Jagiełło ===
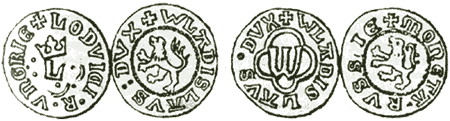
Ruthenian (Kingdom of Rus) Coins of Opolczyk (1389)

On 10 September 1382 King Louis I of Hungary, Vladislaus' protector, died. Despite his earlier support for late King's daughters to inherit the Polish and Hungarian crowns, Vladislaus put his own nomination to the royal crown. However, he wasn't popular among the Polish nobility, and after the engagement between Louis I's daughter Hedwig and William of Habsburg was broken, he supported the candidacy of Duke Siemowit IV of Płock.

Contrary to the old historiography, the Duke of Opole supported the new Polish King Władysław II Jagiełło during the first period of his reign. Some historians accept the fact that in 1386 Vladislaus stood as the King's godfather when he converted to the Catholic faith. However, the cooperation between the Duke of Opole and the King was short-lived: in 1388, after the King dispossessed him of Bydgoszcz, the Duke lead a coup to capture the King and the Wawel Castle. Defeated and captured by Starosta (provincial governor) Sędziwój Pałuka, Vladislaus was forced to give up his claim to the Polish throne. King Władysław II Jagiełło also blocked the nomination of Jan Kropidło for the position of Archbishop of Gniezno.

=== Cooperation with the Teutonic Order. Vladislaus' ambitions and war with Poland. Death ===
Further frictions with the King of Poland took place in May 1391, when Vladislaus pledged the land of Złotów to the Teutonic Order. Aware of the danger that the Teutonic Order to close to his bordes, the King ordained the deprivation of Vladislaus from his fiefs in Polish territory. Against the Royal power, the Duke of Opole capitulated, and in 1392 transferred the disputed territories to Poland (with the exception of Bolesławiec, which, completely loyal to Władysław, only accepted the annexation to the Polish Kingdom after the death of the Duke of Opole).

However, the attitude of Vladislaus was not changed and in 1393 he sold his rights over Dobrzyń to the Teutonic Order. Has also tried to encourage the Great master of the Teutonic Order, Konrad von Wallenrode, to attack the Kingdom with the combination of the troops of Teutonic knights in Poland, Hungary and Bohemia, but the conflict ended unexpectedly. The war, which began successfully (for example, with the siege to Nowy Korczyn on 26 July 1393), finally ended in 1396, when the royal army decided to attack the Silesian lands of Vladislaus. After the Polish troops took control over Strzelce, on 6 August of that year, Vladislaus' nephews decided to make peace with the King of Poland. Since then, the government of the Duchy of Opole was virtually taken over by the sons of Bolko III, and Vladislaus was relegated to a second status.

Disappointed because of his ambitions failed disastrously, Vladislaus died on 18 May 1401 in Opole, and was buried in the local Franciscan monastery.

== Marriages and issue ==
Around 1355 and during his stay in Hungary, Vladislaus married firstly Elisabeth Basarab (b. 1340 – d. c. 1369), daughter of Nicolae Alexandru Basarab, Voivode of Wallachia. They had three daughters:

1. Kinga (b. 1355/57 – d. after 1369), a nun at Alt-Buda.
2. Elisabeth [Agnes] (b. 1360 – d. by 9 September 1411), married in 1372 to Margrave Jobst of Moravia, King of the Romans.
3. Katharina (b. c. 26 March 1367 – d. 6 June 1420), married in 1382 to Duke Henry VIII of Żagań-Głogów-Ścinawa.

By 1369, Vladislaus married secondly Euphemia of Masovia (b. c. 1352 – d. by 9 December 1424), daughter of Duke Siemowit III of Masovia. They had two daughters:

1. Hedwig (b. 1376/78 – d. after 13 May 1390), married before 25 January 1390 to Duke Vygantas-Alexander of Kernavė.
2. Euphemia (d. young, before 30 March 1408).

Because he died without male heirs, Vladislaus' nephews Bolko IV and Bernard inherited the whole Duchy except Głogówek, who was given by the Duke to his wife, Euphemia, as her dower.

Regnal titles
Preceded by Bolko II	Duke of Opole with Bolko III (until 1370) and Henry (until 1365); 1356–1401 (formally since 1396)	Succeeded by Jan Kropidło; Bolko IV; Bernard
Preceded by Direct sovereignty of the Kingdom of Poland	Duke of Wieluń; 1370–1392	Succeeded by Annexed by the Kingdom of Poland
Preceded by Casimir IV, Duke of Pomerania	Duke of Dobrzyń; 1378–1392	Succeeded by Annexed by the Kingdom of Poland
Preceded by Casimir IV, Duke of Pomerania	Duke of Inowrocław; 1378–1392	Succeeded by Annexed by the Kingdom of Poland
Preceded by John II the Iron	Duke of Krnov; 1385–1392	Succeeded by John II the Iron
Political offices
Preceded by Nicholas Kont	Palatine of Hungary; 1367–1372	Succeeded by Emeric Lackfi
Preceded by introduced	Lord of Ruthenia; 1372–1378	Succeeded by voivode Emeric Bebek
