= Henry of Niemodlin =

Henry
- Duke of Niemodlin
- Coat-of-arms of Upper Silesia (Opole, Niemodlin, Strzelce, etc)
- Born: after 1345
- Died: 14 September 1382
- Noble family: Silesian Piasts of Opole
- Spouse: Katharina of Moravia
- Father: Bolesław the Elder
- Mother: Euphemia of Wrocław

Henry of Niemodlin (Polish: Henryk Niemodliński; after 1345 – 14 September 1382), was a Duke of Niemodlin starting in 1365 until his death (with his brothers as co-rulers until 1369).

He was the third and youngest son of Bolesław the Elder, Duke of Niemodlin, by his wife Euphemia, daughter of Henry VI the Good, Duke of Wrocław.

== Life ==
After his father's death by 1365 Henry and his brothers Bolesław II (d. 1368) and Wenceslaus (d. 1369) inherited Niemodlin as co-rulers; however, Henry had to wait to the deaths of his brothers to obtain the full government over the whole Duchy. Around 1370 Henry made an arrangement with the Dukes of Opole, Bolko III and Władysław (who was approved by the Emperor Charles IV in February and March 1372): in case of Henry's death without issue, Niemodlin was inherited by the Dukes of Opole.

Henry maintained a long-lasting dispute with the Bishop of Wroclaw, Preczlaw of Pogarell, for the possession of the castle Jánský vrch, which only ended with the Bishop's death in 1376. His relations with the new bishop, Duke Wenceslaus II of Legnica, were correct because he chosen to live in Otmuchów. In 1373 Henry granted a charter to the town of Głogówek, who was greatly favored by him. In 1379 he founded there a Kolegiata, who received the revenues of two villages.

By 2 February 1372 Henry married with Katharina (b. ca. February 1353 – d. by 17 February 1378), daughter of John Henry, Margrave of Moravia and niece of Emperor Charles IV. The union was childless.

Henry died on 14 September 1382 year and was buried in the Kolegiata of St. Bartholomäus in Głogów.

Contrary to the agreement of 1372, after Henry's death, Niemodlin was taken by King Wenceslaus IV of Bohemia as an emptied fief, and pretend to given them to Przemysław I Noszak, Duke of Cieszyn, but this caused the strong opposition of the Dukes of Opole, who claimed his hereditary rights.

Only one year later, in 1383, was ruled the final decision over this matter. The Duchy was divided: Władysław of Opole received Głogówek and Prudnik, and Bolko III's sons obtain Niemodlin.

Regnal titles
Preceded by Bolesław the Elder	Duke of Niemodlin with Bolesław II (until 1368) and Wenceslaus (until 1369); 1365–1382	Succeeded by Bolko IV; Henry II; Bernard
