= Wenceslaus of Niemodlin =

14th-century Polish noble

Wenceslaus
- Duke of Niemodlin, Gliwice
- Coat-of-arms of Upper Silesia (Opole, Niemodlin, Strzelce, Gliwice, etc)
- Born: 1336/46
- Died: June 1369
- Noble family: Silesian Piasts of Opole
- Spouse: Euphemia of Bytom
- Father: Bolesław the Elder
- Mother: Euphemia of Wrocław

Wenceslaus of Niemodlin (Polish: Wacław Niemodliński) (1336/46 – June 1369) was Duke of Niemodlin from 1365 until his death (with his brothers as co-rulers), and Duke of Gliwice from 1364.

He was the second son of Bolesław the Elder, Duke of Niemodlin, by his wife Euphemia, daughter of Henry VI the Good, Duke of Wrocław.

== Life ==
Little is known about his early years of life. In 1364 Wenceslaus married with Euphemia (b. 1350/52 – d. 26 August 1411), daughter of Duke Bolesław of Bytom; by virtue of this union, he received the district of Gliwice, according to the inheritance treaty signed by his wife's grandfather, Duke Władysław of Bytom with the Kingdom of Bohemia.

After the death of his father in 1365, Wenceslaus and his brothers inherited Niemodlin and Prudnik as co-rulers, although the full government was exercised by the older brother, Bolesław II. Only after Bolesław II's death in 1368, Wenceslaus could take the full government over Niemodlin; however his reign was short-lived: he died just one year later.

Because he died without issue, his domains were divided: Niemodlin passed to his youngest and only surviving brother, Henry, and Gliwice was taken by the Dukes of Oleśnica.

Regnal titles
Preceded by Bolesław the Elder	Duke of Niemodlin with Bolesław II (until 1368) and Henry; 1365–1369	Succeeded by Henry
