= Bokowe =

Bokowe refers to the following places in Poland:

- Bokowe, Opole Voivodeship
- Bokowe, Podlaskie Voivodeship
