= Bolesław II of Niemodlin =

Bolesław II
- Duke of Niemodlin
- Coat-of-arms of Upper Silesia (Opole, Niemodlin, Strzelce, etc)
- Born: 1326/35
- Died: by 25 June 1368
- Noble family: Silesian Piasts of Opole
- Father: Bolesław the Elder
- Mother: Euphemia of Wrocław

Bolesław II of Niemodlin (Polish: Bolesław II Niemodliński; 1326/35 – by 25 June 1368), was a Duke of Niemodlin since 1365 until his death (with his brothers as co-rulers).

He was the eldest son of Bolesław the Elder, Duke of Niemodlin, by his wife Euphemia, daughter of Henry VI the Good, Duke of Wrocław.

== Life ==
In 1355, thanks to the contacts of his father in the Prague court, Bolesław II was appointed Judge court by Emperor Charles IV.

After the death of his father by 1365, Bolesław II and his brothers inherited Niemodlin as co-rulers. He followed the politics of cooperation with the Bohemian Kingdom and in 1367 he obtain Prudnik as a hereditary fief.

Bolesław II never married or had children. He died between 1367 and 1368 and his place of burial is unknown.

== Footnotes ==
Regnal titles
Preceded by Bolesław the Elder	Duke of Niemodlin; 1365–1368; With: Wenceslaus and Henry	Succeeded by Wenceslaus and Henry
