= Johannes Nucius =

German composer and music theorist

Johannes Nucius (also Nux, Nucis) (c. 1556 – March 25, 1620) was a German composer and music theorist of the late Renaissance and early Baroque eras. Although isolated from most of the major centers of musical activity, he was a polished composer in the style of Lassus and penned an extremely influential treatise on the rhetorical application of compositional devices.

== Life ==
Nucius was born in Görlitz, in Lower Silesia. He studied at the Gymnasium in Görlitz with Johannes Winckler, who was so influential in his development that he referred to him reverentially in his later writings. In 1586 he became a monk in the monastery in Rauden, in Upper Silesia; there he received a humanistic education to supplement the considerable musical training he had received under Winckler. He rose in the hierarchy at the monastery, becoming a deacon, and later an abbot at Himmelwitz; however in 1598 he turned over most of his duties to his assistants in order to compose and write his musical treatise.

He died at Himmelwitz (now Jemielnica, Poland), near the town of Strehlitz, in Upper Silesia (now Strzelce Opolskie, Poland).

== Works and influence ==
Nucius's music shows the influence of Lassus above all. He published two collections of motets, containing a total of 102 pieces, as well as several masses; his works were published in Prague and Liegnitz. The writing is homophonic but with an abundance of expressive devices, the exact application of which he later described in detail in his major treatise, Musices poeticae.

It was his Musices poeticae which gained him his fame, and his resulting reputation lasted at least until the 18th century; this treatise was influential on three of the most famous German Baroque treatises of all, the Syntagma musicum (1618) of Michael Praetorius, the Critica musica (1722-1723) of Johann Mattheson, and Johann Gottfried Walther's Musicalisches Lexicon of 1732.

Musices poeticae is a guide to composition. It focuses primarily on counterpoint, and includes nine chapters, which cover topics as diverse as the definition of music, the definition of sound, intervals which are concords and discords, the proper succession of Consonance and dissonance, musical modes, cadences, composed versus improvised counterpoint, and proper techniques of composition for differing numbers of voices. The most famous chapter is the 7th, with its unique list of specific musical devices which can be used to express different feelings. It is the first in a German Baroque tradition of comparison of musical devices with rhetorical devices, an idea which was to be later expanded by Joachim Burmeister and Mattheson.

Some of the devices named are: commissura (passing note dissonances), fuga (melodic imitation of varying kinds), repetitio (the repetition of a section for dramatic effect), climax (passages in parallel thirds or tenths), complexio (the reprise of an opening passage at the end to make a cohesive statement), homoioteleuton (the dramatic use of silence by inserting a sudden rest for rhetorical effect) (in this Nucius is one of the first music theorists to recognize the powerful musical use of silence, an idea which was to attain fame in modern times in the work of John Cage), and syncopatio (syncopation, for rhythmic enhancement). All of these devices are presented with suggestions for their employment, with examples of texts they can set effectively.

Nucius, though he represented an aspect of early Baroque practice, looked mainly to the past—and sometimes the distant past—for his examples of rhetorical devices in music. He considered John Dunstaple to be the earliest composer of expressive music (though earlier music may not have been available to him), and other composers he wrote about included Gilles Binchois, Antoine Busnois, Johannes Ockeghem, Heinrich Isaac, Ludwig Senfl, Josquin des Prez, and of course Lassus.

While some of his book is based on previous writings by Heinrich Glarean and Franchinus Gaffurius, the section on the rhetorical devices in music is original, and signifies the rapidly changing practice during the transitional period between Renaissance and Baroque styles.

== References and further reading ==
- George Buelow: "Johannes Nucius" and "Rhetoric and Music," in The New Grove Dictionary of Music and Musicians, ed. Stanley Sadie. 20 vol. London, Macmillan Publishers Ltd., 1980. ISBN 1-56159-174-2
