= Lešná =

- Municipality
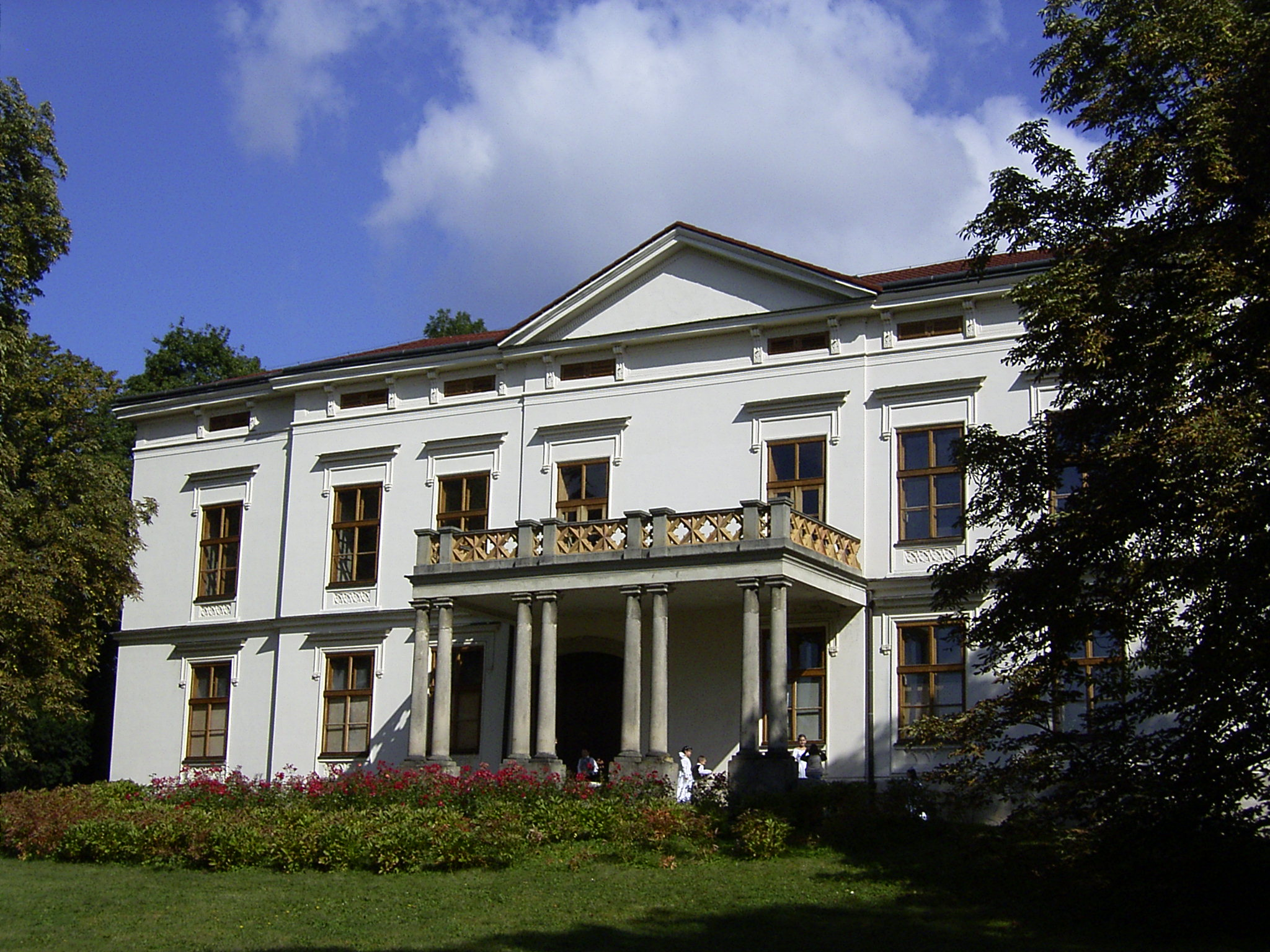
- Lešná Castle

- Flag Coat of arms

- Location in the Czech Republic
- Coordinates: 49°31′14″N 17°55′48″E
- Country: Czech Republic
- Region: Zlín
- District: Vsetín
- First mentioned: 1355

Area
  - Total: 22.63 km^{2} (8.74 sq mi)
- Elevation: 278 m (912 ft)

Population (2026-01-01)
  - Total: 2,159
  - Density: 95.40/km^{2} (247.1/sq mi)
- Time zone: UTC+1 (CET)
  - Summer (DST): UTC+2 (CEST)
- Postal code: 756 41
- Website: www.obec-lesna.cz

Lešná is a municipality and village in Vsetín District in the Zlín Region of the Czech Republic. It has about 2,100 inhabitants.

== Administrative division ==
Lešná consists of seven municipal parts (in brackets population according to the 2021 census):

- Lešná (719)
- Jasenice (394)
- Lhotka nad Bečvou (214)
- Mštěnovice (143)
- Perná (254)
- Příluky (113)
- Vysoká (170)

== Geography ==
Lešná is located about 9 kilometres (6 mi) southwest of Nový Jičín and 20 km (12 mi) north of Vsetín. It lies in the Moravian-Silesian Foothills. The highest point is at 466 m (1,529 ft) above sea level. The municipality is situated on the right bank of the Bečva River.

== History ==
The first written mention of Lešná is from 1355. From 1481 to 1628, it was owned by the Pražma family. In 1621, the army of King Ferdinand II burned Lešná in retaliation for Beneš Pražma's resistance against the king. In 1628–1641, Lešná was a property of Martin Půhončí of Předností, who took care of the restoration of the destroyed estate. He had rebuilt the local fortress into a Renaissance castle and had rebuilt the church. In the following centuries, the owners of the estate often changed. The last owners before the establishment of an independent municipality were the Kinsky family (1887–1945).

== Demographics ==
Historical population

| Year | Pop. | ±% |
|---|---|---|
| 1869 | 1,762 | — |
| 1880 | 1,907 | +8.2% |
| 1890 | 1,946 | +2.0% |
| 1900 | 1,944 | −0.1% |
| 1910 | 2,012 | +3.5% |

| Year | Pop. | ±% |
|---|---|---|
| 1921 | 2,045 | +1.6% |
| 1930 | 2,109 | +3.1% |
| 1950 | 2,015 | −4.5% |
| 1961 | 2,122 | +5.3% |
| 1970 | 1,948 | −8.2% |

| Year | Pop. | ±% |
|---|---|---|
| 1980 | 1,927 | −1.1% |
| 1991 | 1,821 | −5.5% |
| 2001 | 1,960 | +7.6% |
| 2011 | 1,941 | −1.0% |
| 2021 | 2,007 | +3.4% |

Source: Censuses

== Transport ==
The I/35 road (part of the European route E442), which connects the D1 motorway with Valašské Meziříčí and the Czech–Slovak border, runs through the municipality.

The village of Lhotka nad Bečvou is located on the railway line Olomouc–Vsetín.

== Sights ==
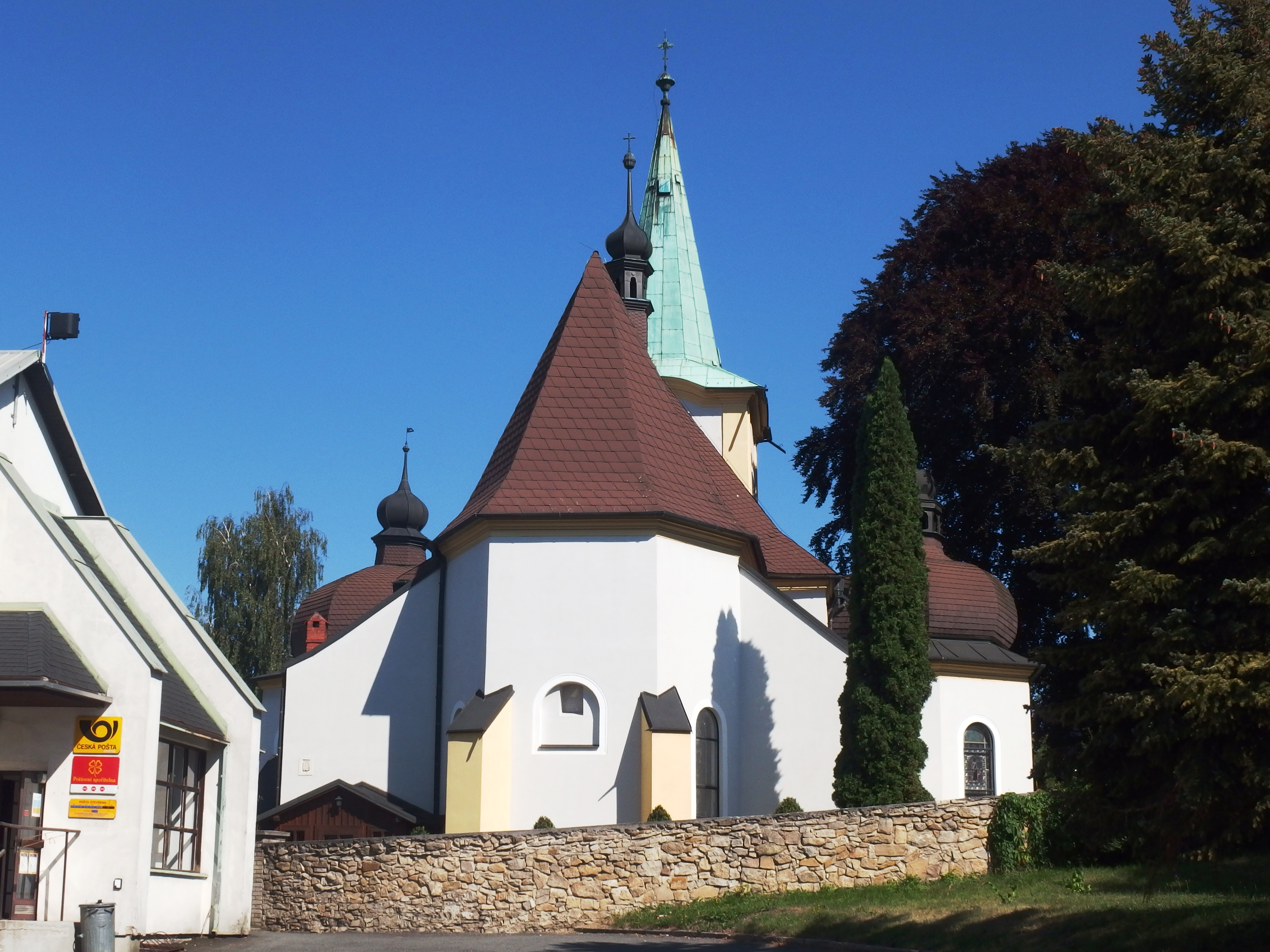
Church of Saint Michael the Archangel

The Lešná Castle was built in the first half of the 17th century in the site of a medieval fortress. The late Renaissance castle was rebuilt in the Neoclassical style in the late 19th century by the Kinsky family. In 1820–1840, an English park with an area of 7.2 hectares (17.8 acres) was founded. The park has a rich collection of mainly exotic trees and shrubs.

The Church of Saint Michael the Archangel is the oldest building in the municipality. It was built in the Baroque style in 1635.

== Notable people ==
- Josef Seilern (1883–1939), Austrian-Czech ornithologist and oologist
