= Henry II of Niemodlin =

Henry II
- Duke of Strzelce, Niemodlin
- Coat-of-arms of Upper Silesia (Opole, Strzelce, Niemodlin, etc)
- Born: 1374
- Died: 22 December 1394 (aged 19–20)
- Noble family: Silesian Piasts of Opole
- Father: Bolko III of Strzelce
- Mother: Anna (of Oświęcim?)

Henry II of Niemodlin (Polish: Henryk II niemodliński) (1374 – 22 December 1394) was a Duke of Strzelce and Niemodlin since 1382 until his death (with his brothers as co-rulers and only formally).

He was the third son of Duke Bolko III of Strzelce by his wife Anna, probably daughter of Duke Jan I of Oświęcim.

== Life ==
There are little notices about Henry II's life. Since his early years, he was destined to the Church career and had to study at the University of Bologna. According to the chronicle of Jan Długosz, Henry II died during his return trip to Poland on 22 December 1394. He was buried in the Ducal vault of the Franciscan church in Opole.

Regnal titles
Preceded by Bolko III	Duke of Strzelce with Bolko IV and Bernard; 1382–1394	Succeeded by Bolko IV and Bernard
Preceded by Henry	Duke of Niemodlin with Bolko IV and Bernard; 1382–1394	Succeeded by Bolko IV and Bernard
