= Gmina Jemielnica =

Gmina Jemielnica Gemeinde Himmelwitz Jemielnica Commune
- Gmina
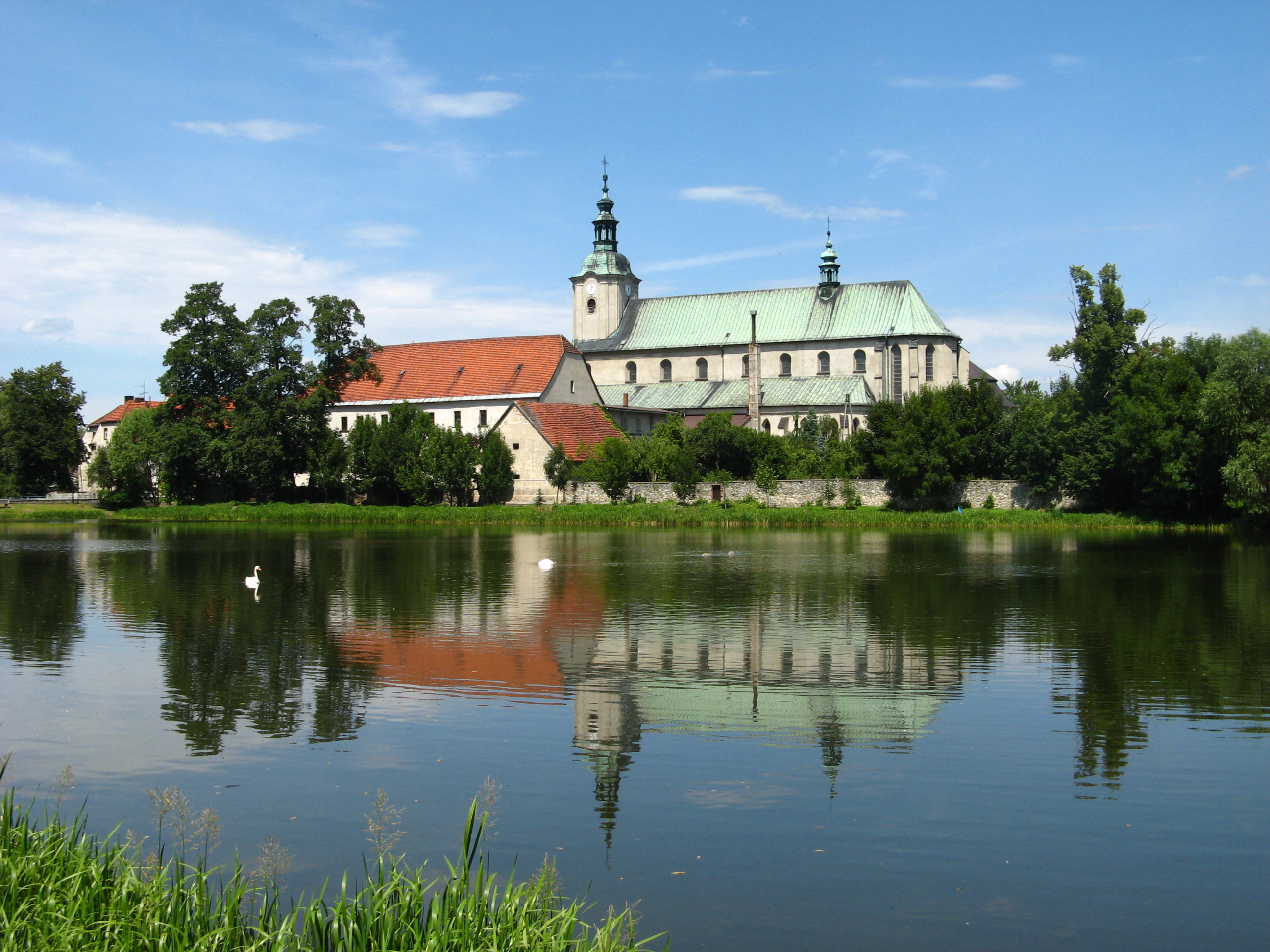
- Cistercian Abbey in Jemielnica

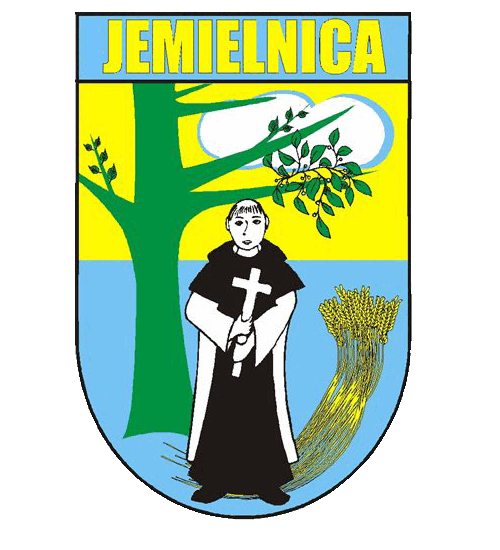
- Flag Coat of arms
- Interactive map of Gmina Jemielnica
- Coordinates (Jemielnica): 50°32′39″N 18°22′50″E
- Country: Poland
- Voivodeship: Opole
- County: Strzelce
- Seat: Jemielnica

Area
  - Total: 113.21 km^{2} (43.71 sq mi)

Population (2019-06-30)
  - Total: 7,219
  - Density: 63.77/km^{2} (165.2/sq mi)
- Time zone: UTC+1 (CET)
  - Summer (DST): UTC+2 (CEST)
- Vehicle registration: OST
- Website: http://www.jemielnica.pl

Gmina Jemielnica (German: Gemeinde Himmelwitz) is a rural gmina (administrative district) in Strzelce County, Opole Voivodeship, in southern Poland. Its seat is the village of Jemielnica, which lies approximately 9 kilometres (6 mi) north-east of Strzelce Opolskie and 35 km (22 mi) south-east of the regional capital Opole.

The gmina covers an area of 113.21 square kilometres (43.7 sq mi), and as of 2019, had a total population of 7,219. Since 2006, the commune has been officially bilingual in Polish and German, with a substantial German population remaining in the area after it was transferred to Poland following World War II.

A famous tourist sight in the area is Jemielnica Abbey, where the German Baroque composer Johannes Nucius died in 1620.

On 28 August 2006 German was declared an additional official language of the commune, and on November 14, 2008, the old German place-names were reintroduced, with bilingual signage set up.

== Villages ==
The commune contains the villages and settlements of Jemielnica, Barut, Bokowe, Centawa, Gąsiorowice, Łaziska, Piotrówka and Wierchlesie.

== Demographics ==
At the time of the census of 2002, the commune had 7,702 inhabitants. Of these, 4,091 (53.1%) declared the Polish nationality; 1,871 persons (24.3%) declared the German nationality; and 627 (8.1%) with the non-recognized Silesian nationality. 1,096 inhabitants (14.2%) declared no nationality.

== Neighbouring gminas ==
Gmina Jemielnica is bordered by the gminas of Kolonowskie, Strzelce Opolskie, Wielowieś and Zawadzkie.

== Notable residents ==
- Johannes Nucius (c. 1556–1620), German composer and abbot of Himmelwitz Abbey
- Elisabeth Kollmansberger, German singer

== Twin towns – sister cities ==
Gmina Jemielnica is twinned with:

- Laubusch (Lauta), Germany
- Wickede, Germany
