= Barut =

Barut Liebenhain
- Village
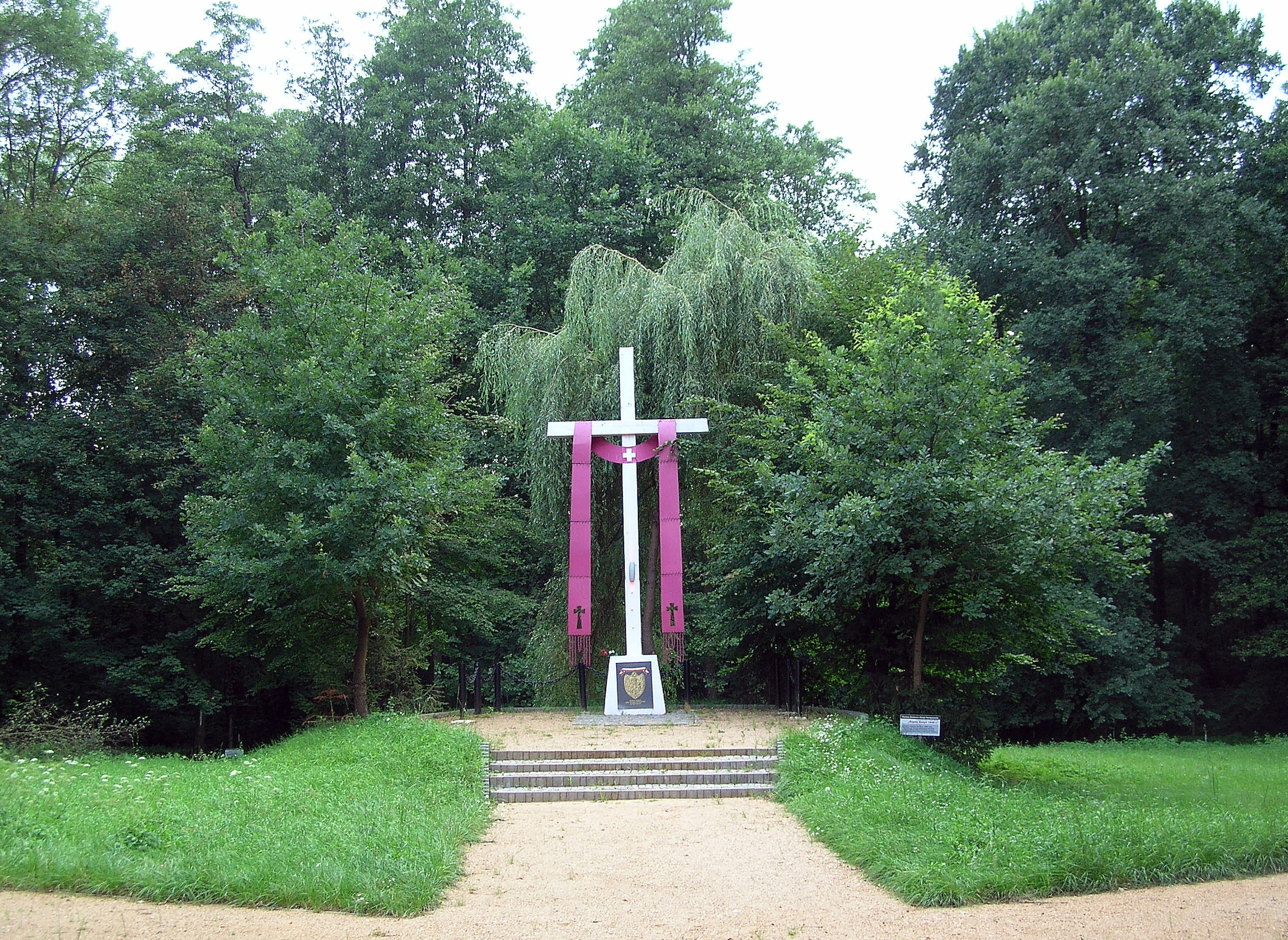
- Memorial to murdered Polish partisans in Barut

- Location within Poland
- Coordinates: 50°33′14″N 18°25′33″E
- Country: Poland
- Voivodeship: Opole
- County: Strzelce
- Gmina: Jemielnica
- Time zone: UTC+1 (CET)
  - Summer (DST): UTC+2 (CEST)
- Vehicle registration: OST

Barut ([ˈbarut], additional name in German: Liebenhain) is a village in the administrative district of Gmina Jemielnica, within Strzelce County, Opole Voivodeship, in southern Poland.
