= Albert of Strzelce =

Albert
- Duke of Opole, Strzelce
- Coat-of-arms of Upper Silesia (Opole, Strzelce, Niemodlin, etc)
- Born: after 1300
- Died: around 25 September 1375
- Noble family: Silesian Piasts of Opole
- Spouse: Agnes of Hardegg
- Issue: Elisabeth
- Father: Bolko I of Opole
- Mother: Agnes of Margrave

Albert of Strzelce (Polish: Albert strzelecki; after 1300 – around 25 September 1375), was a Duke of Opole 1313–1323 (with his brother as co-ruler) and Duke of Strzelce from 1323 until his death.

He was the third and youngest son of Duke Bolko I of Opole by his wife Agnes, probably daughter of Margrave Otto III of Brandenburg. He was the second and last member of the Piast dynasty who bore this name (the first was a son of Władysław II the Exile).

== Life ==
After his father's death in 1313 Albert and his older brother Bolko II inherited Opole, but because both are minors at that time, the regency was held by their oldest brother Bolesław the Elder until 1323, when they assumed the full government over his domains; however, soon after Albert and Bolko II decided to make the formal division of their domains: Bolko II retain the main city of Opole and Albert took Strzelce.

About his internal and foreign politics there are little notices. In 1327, he became a vassal of the Bohemian crown; but, for unknown reasons, he didn't paid homage to King John of Luxembourg with the other Silesian Dukes in Opawa. In 1326, he granted urban Privileges to the capital of his Duchy, Strzelce. He also supported financially the Cistercian monastery of Jemielnica, who was founded by his father.

It's unknown the exact date of his death. The last notice of Albert as a living person was around 1366, although some historians assumed that he died by between 1370–1375. He was buried in the monastery of Jemielnica, where his portrait is shown there until today.

== Marriage and issue ==
In 1347, Albert married with Agnes (d. 27 May 1371), daughter of Count Burchard I of Hardegg, Burgrave of Magdeburg. They had one daughter:

1. Elisabeth (b. ca. 1348 – d. by 17 April 1361), married bef. 1 December 1359 to Władysław the White, Duke of Gniewkowo.

After his death without male heirs, his lands were inherited by his nephew Bolko III, second son of Bolko II.

Albert of Strzelce House of Piast Born: after 1300 Died: around 25 September 1375
Regnal titles
Preceded by Bolko I	Duke of Opole with Bolko II; 1313–1323	Succeeded by Bolko II
New division	Duke of Strzelce; 1323–1375	Succeeded by Bolko III
