= Centawa =

- Village
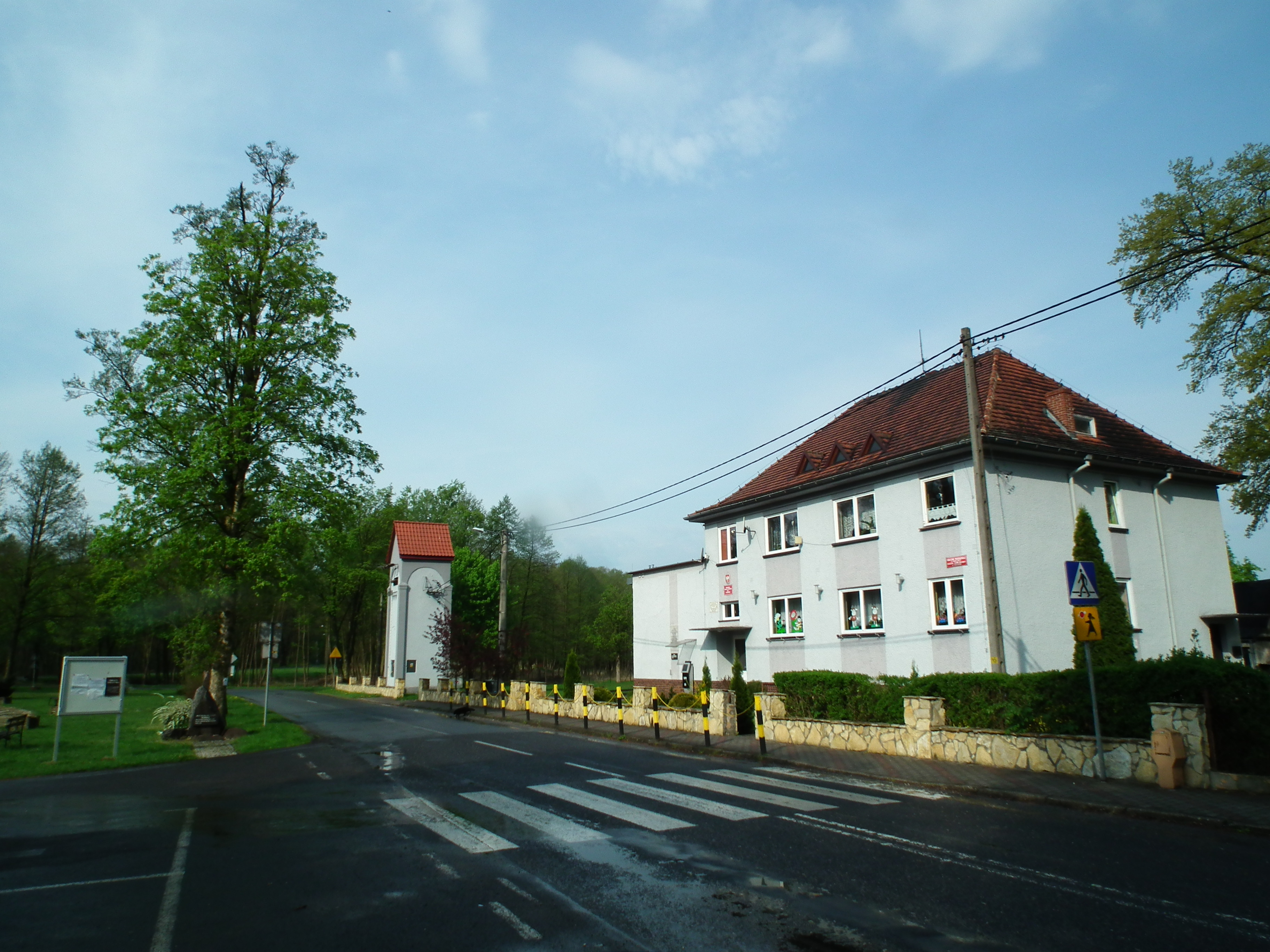

- Location within Poland
- Coordinates: 50°30′N 18°24′E
- Country: Poland
- Voivodeship: Opole
- County: Strzelce
- Gmina: Jemielnica

Centawa [t͡sɛnˈtava] is a village in the administrative district of Gmina Jemielnica, within Strzelce County, Opole Voivodeship, in south-western Poland.
