= Piotrówka, Opole Voivodeship =

Piotrówka Petersgrätz
- Village
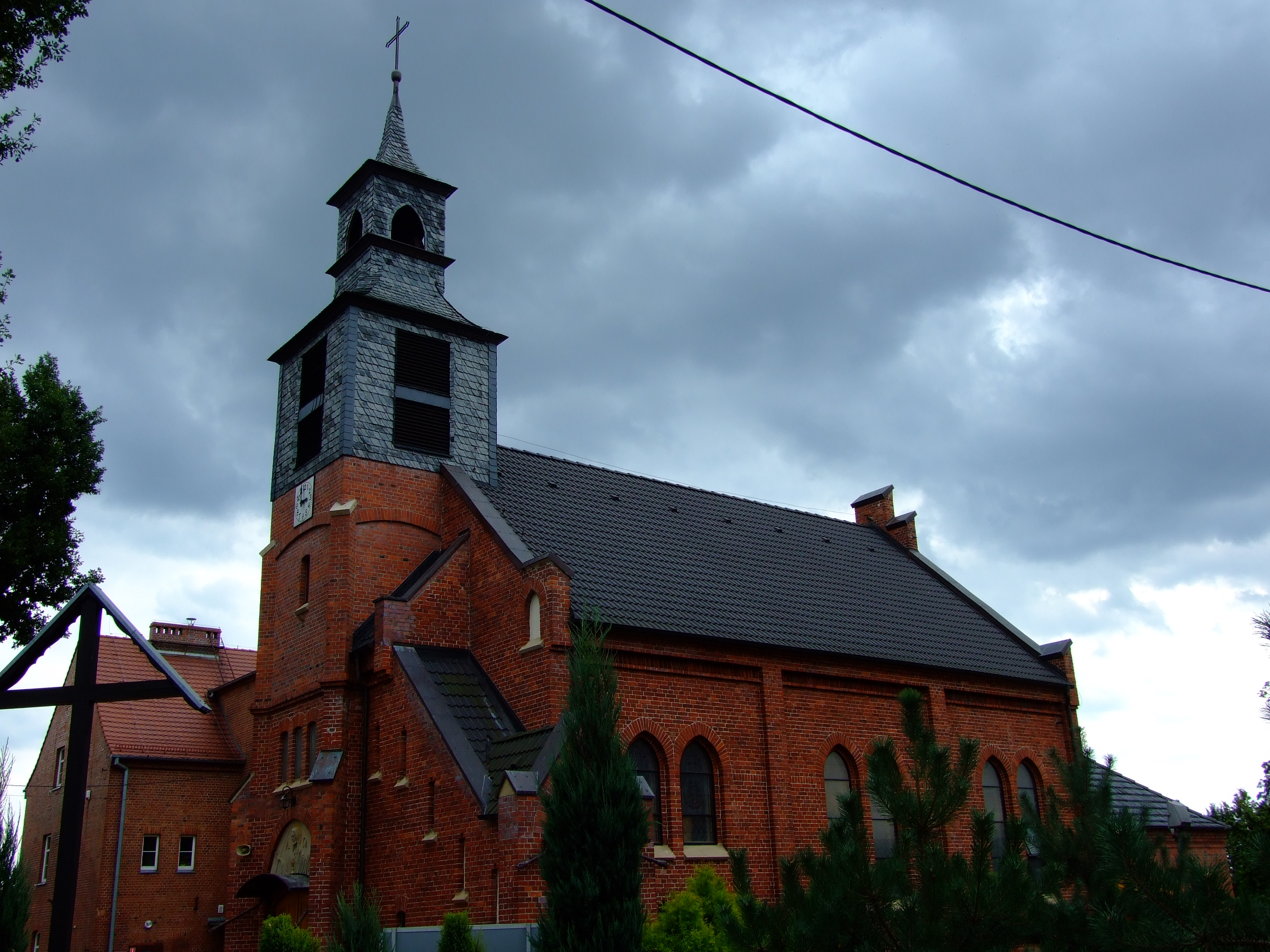
- Church of the Immaculate Conception

- Location within Poland
- Coordinates: 50°33′52″N 18°23′18″E
- Country: Poland
- Voivodeship: Opole
- County: Strzelce
- Gmina: Jemielnica
- Founded: 1832

Population
  - Total: 1,000
- Time zone: UTC+1 (CET)
  - Summer (DST): UTC+2 (CEST)
- Vehicle registration: OST

Piotrówka ([pjɔˈtrufka], additional name in German: Petersgrätz) is a village in the administrative district of Gmina Jemielnica, within Strzelce County, Opole Voivodeship, in the southern Polish region of Upper Silesia.

Since 2006 the village has been officially bilingual in Polish and German.

== History ==
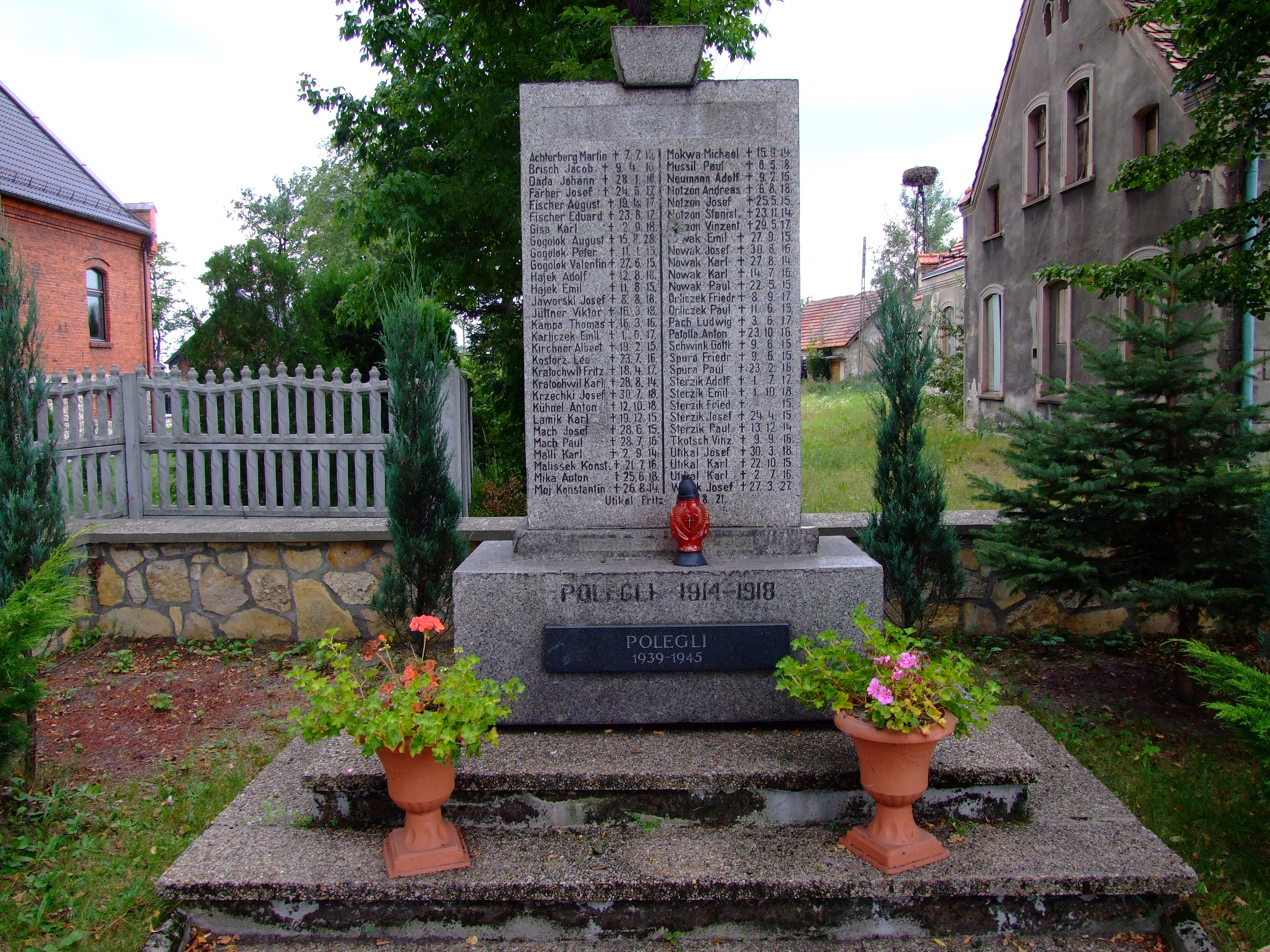
War Memorial

The village of Petersgrätz was founded in 1832 by 60 colonists from the nearby village of Friedrichsgrätz (Grodziec). The colonists were mainly members of the Unity of the Brethren (Hussites), and the town was named after their pastor, Peter Schikora, who was actively involved in the village's establishment. In 1841 a Protestant school opened, which was replaced by a new building in 1882, and in 1892 the first Protestant church was built. In 1871 the village became part of the German Empire.

In the Upper Silesia plebiscite of March 1921, 639 villagers voted to remain in Germany and 169 voted to join the newly created Second Polish Republic. As a result, Petersgrätz remained as a village of the Weimar Republic.

In 1945, the Red Army occupied the village and drove a large part of its population out. The town was first renamed Piotrogród, then later Piotrówka. The Protestant church was converted into a Catholic church, and in 1946 a separate parish was formed for the village.

In 2006 the village was declared bilingual in Polish and German, and in 2008 the original German name of Petersgrätz was again made official.

In the center of town there is a war memorial honoring the soldiers from Petersgrätz who died in World War II.
