= Josef Seilern =

Josef Graf von Seilern und Aspang (25 November 1883, Lešná Castle – 18 August 1939, Zlín) was an Austrian-Czech ornithologist and oologist. Seilern was primarily interested in the Neotropical avifauna. His collections are held by Moravské zemské muzeum.

== Works ==
Partial list

- Hellmayr, C.E., and J. von Seilern. 1912. Beiträge zur Ornithologie von Venezuela. Archiv für Naturgeschichte 78A: 34–166.
