= Gąsiorowice =

Gąsiorowice Gonschiorowitz
- Village
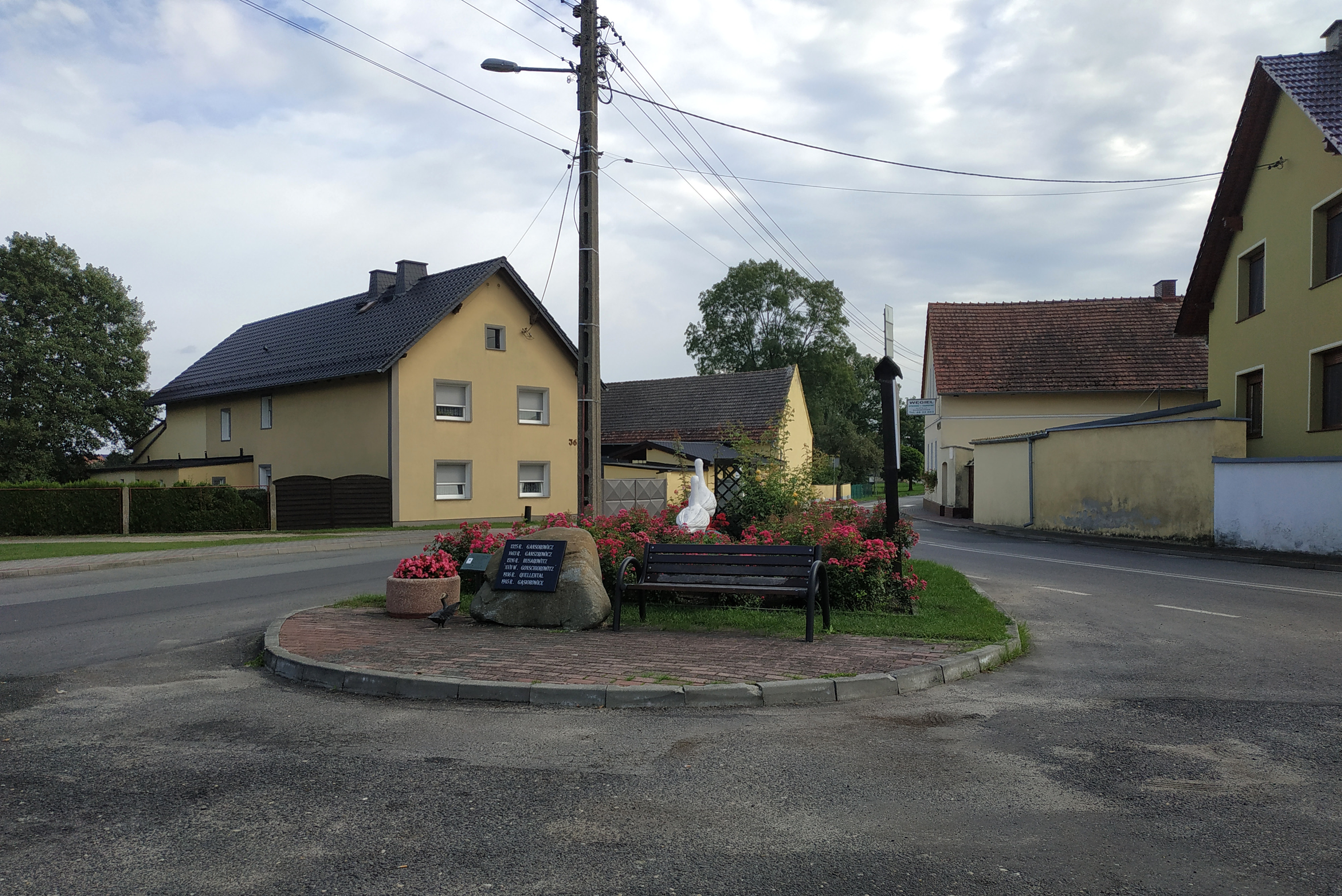

- Location within Poland
- Coordinates: 50°33′47″N 18°20′57″E
- Country: Poland
- Voivodeship: Opole
- County: Strzelce
- Gmina: Jemielnica
- Time zone: UTC+1 (CET)
  - Summer (DST): UTC+2 (CEST)
- Vehicle registration: OST

Gąsiorowice ([ɡɔ̃ɕɔrɔˈvit͡sɛ], additional name in German: Gonschiorowitz) is a village in the administrative district of Gmina Jemielnica, within Strzelce County, Opole Voivodeship, in southern Poland.
