= Łaziska, Opole Voivodeship =

Łaziska Lasisk
- Village
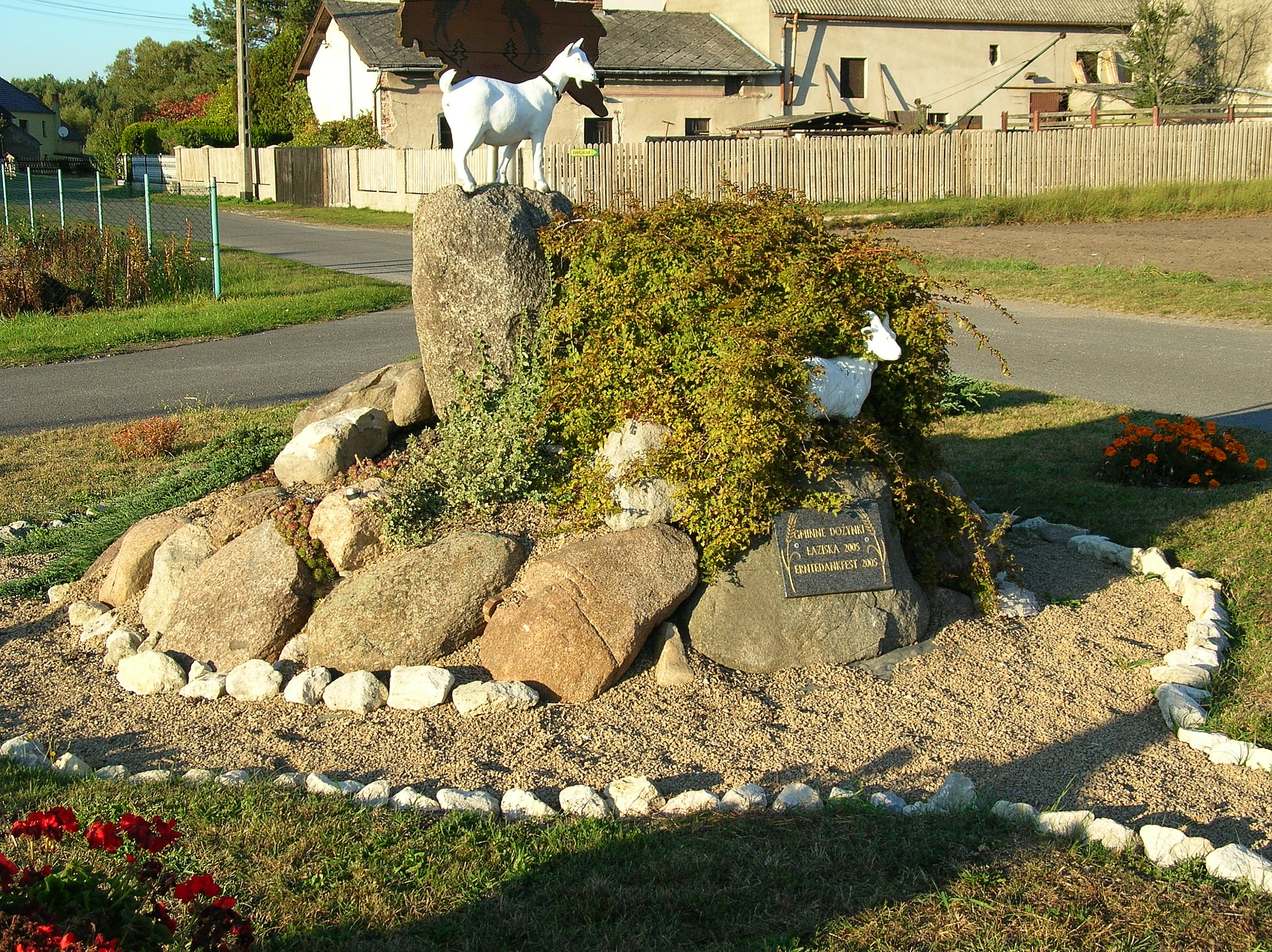

- Location within Poland
- Coordinates: 50°35′N 18°22′E
- Country: Poland
- Voivodeship: Opole
- County: Strzelce
- Gmina: Jemielnica
- Time zone: UTC+1 (CET)
  - Summer (DST): UTC+2 (CEST)
- Vehicle registration: OST
- Website: www.naszelaziska.prv.pl

Łaziska ([waˈʑiska], additional name in German: Lasisk) is a village in the administrative district of Gmina Jemielnica, within Strzelce County, Opole Voivodeship, in southern Poland.
