= Praschma =

German noble family of Praschma

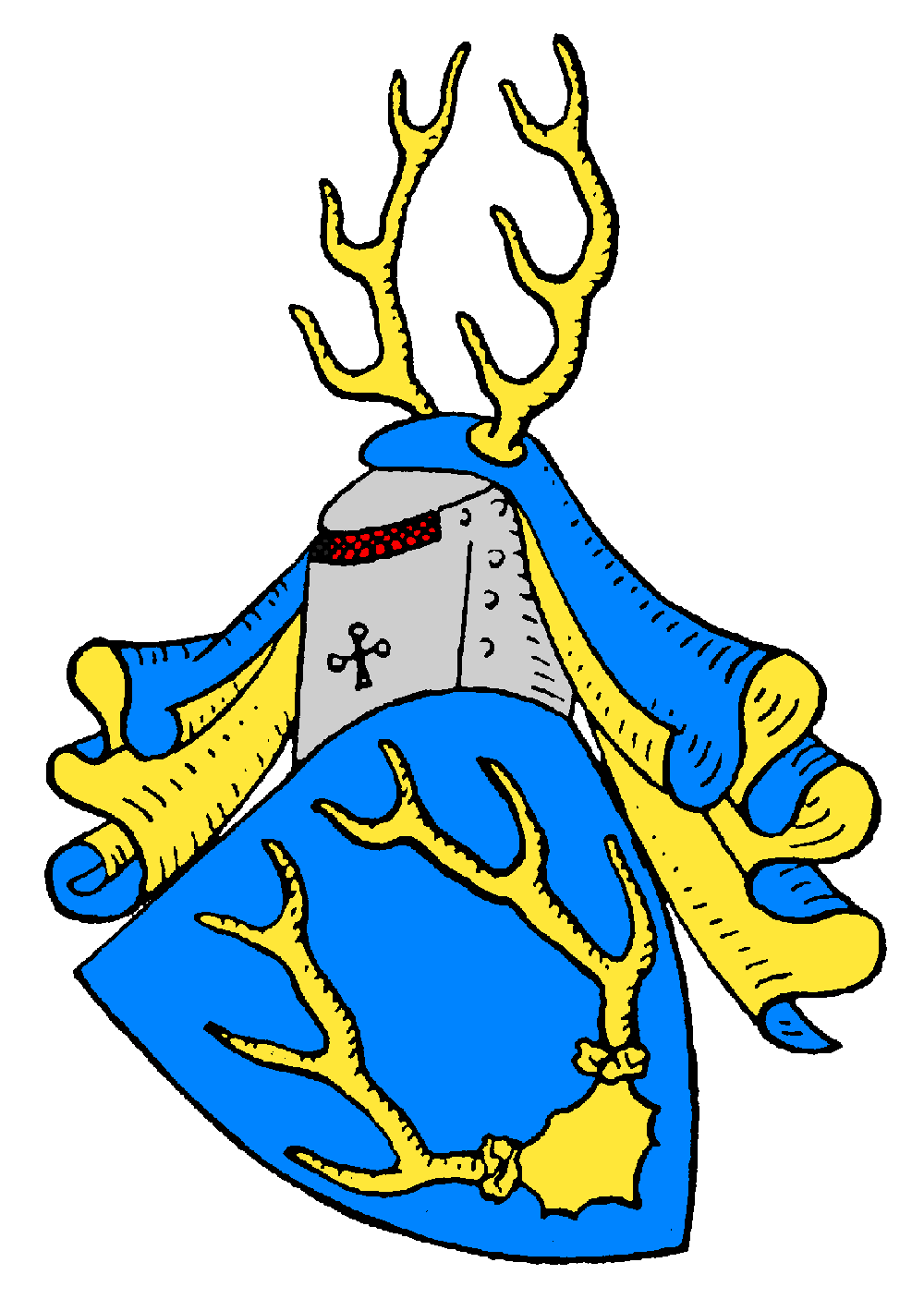
Coat of Arms of the Counts Praschma of Bilkau and Falkenberg

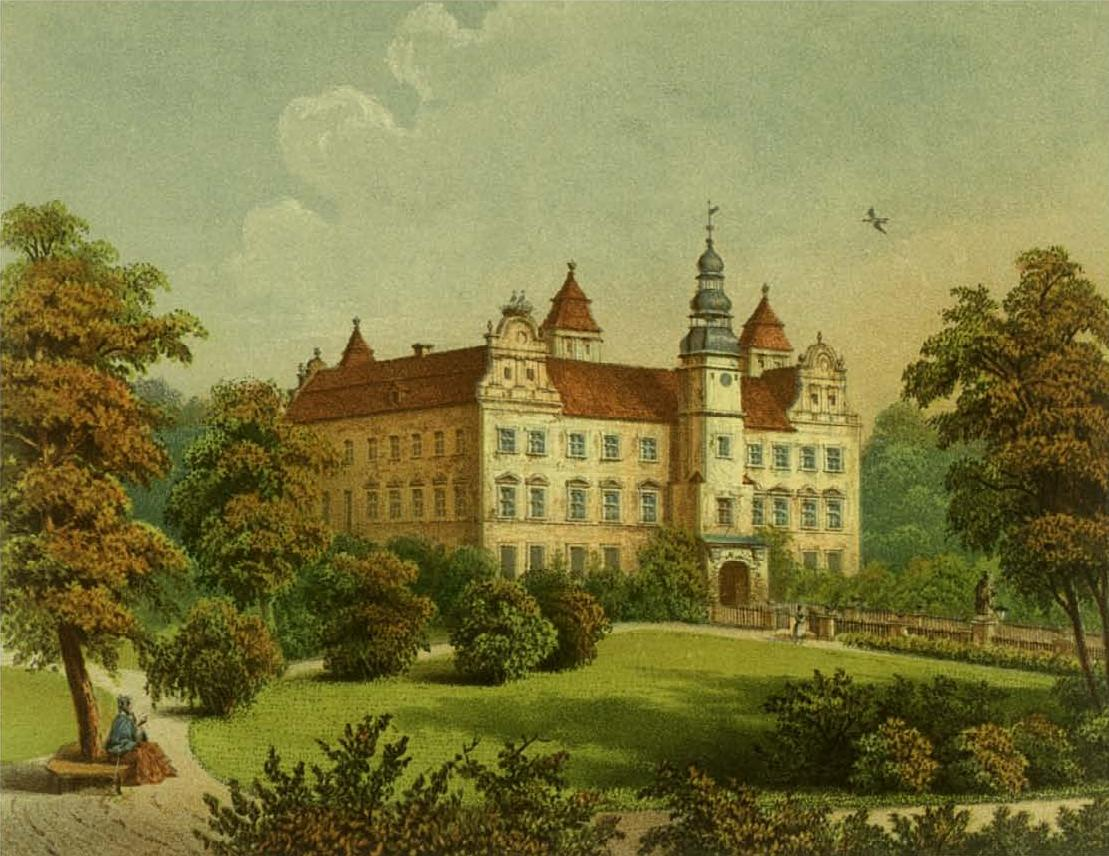
Castle Falkenberg, painting, Alexander Duncker

Praschma or Pražma (fully Praschma of Bilkau and Falkenberg; Czech: Pražmové z Bílkova or Páni z Bílkova; Polish: Prazma) is a Moravian noble family.

Notable members include Jan Nepomuk I. Ferdinand Pražma (1726–1804), the founder of the Czech village Pražmo; Friedrich von Praschma, member of the Reichstag and co-founder of the Centre Party (Germany); and Hans Praschma von Bilkau, Reichstag member from 1902 to 1918, member of the Prussian House of Representatives, and Bailiff Knight Grand Cross of the Sovereign Military Order of Malta.

The family seat was in the town of Niemodlin (then known as Falkenberg) until the end of World War II, when the town became part of the nascent Eastern Bloc.
