= Henry of Opole =

Henry
- Duke of Opole; Cathedral Canon of Wrocław
- Coat-of-arms of Upper Silesia (Opole, Strzelce, Niemodlin, etc)
- Born: c. 18 August 1338; Opole, Poland
- Died: c. 23 October 1365 (aged 27)
- Father: Bolko II of Opole
- Mother: Elizabeth of Świdnica

Henry of Opole (Polish: Henryk opolski; c. 18 August 1338 – c. 23 October 1365), was the Duke of Opole from 1356 until his death.

He was the third and youngest son of Duke Bolko II of Opole and his wife Elisabeth, daughter of Duke Bernard of Świdnica.

== Life ==
Little is known about his life. As the youngest child he was destined to a church life. During his father's lifetime Henry was chosen Canon of the Cathedral of Wrocław.

After the death of Duke Bolko II in 1356, Henry and his brothers Władysław Opolczyk and Bolko III inherited Opole as co-rulers; however, his rule was only a formal one.

Around 1356 Henry began his efforts to obtain the Canonry of the Cathedral of Prague. This is the last information of him as a living person, and probably he died soon afterwards. Although some historians put the date of his death not until 1365. The place of his burial is unknown.

Henry of Opole House of Piast Born: c. 18 August 1338 Died: c. 23 October 1365
Regnal titles
Preceded by Bolko II	Duke of Opole with Władysław and Bolko III; 1356–1365	Succeeded by Władysław Opolczyk and Bolko III
