= Jemielnica =

Jemielnica Himmelwitz
- Village
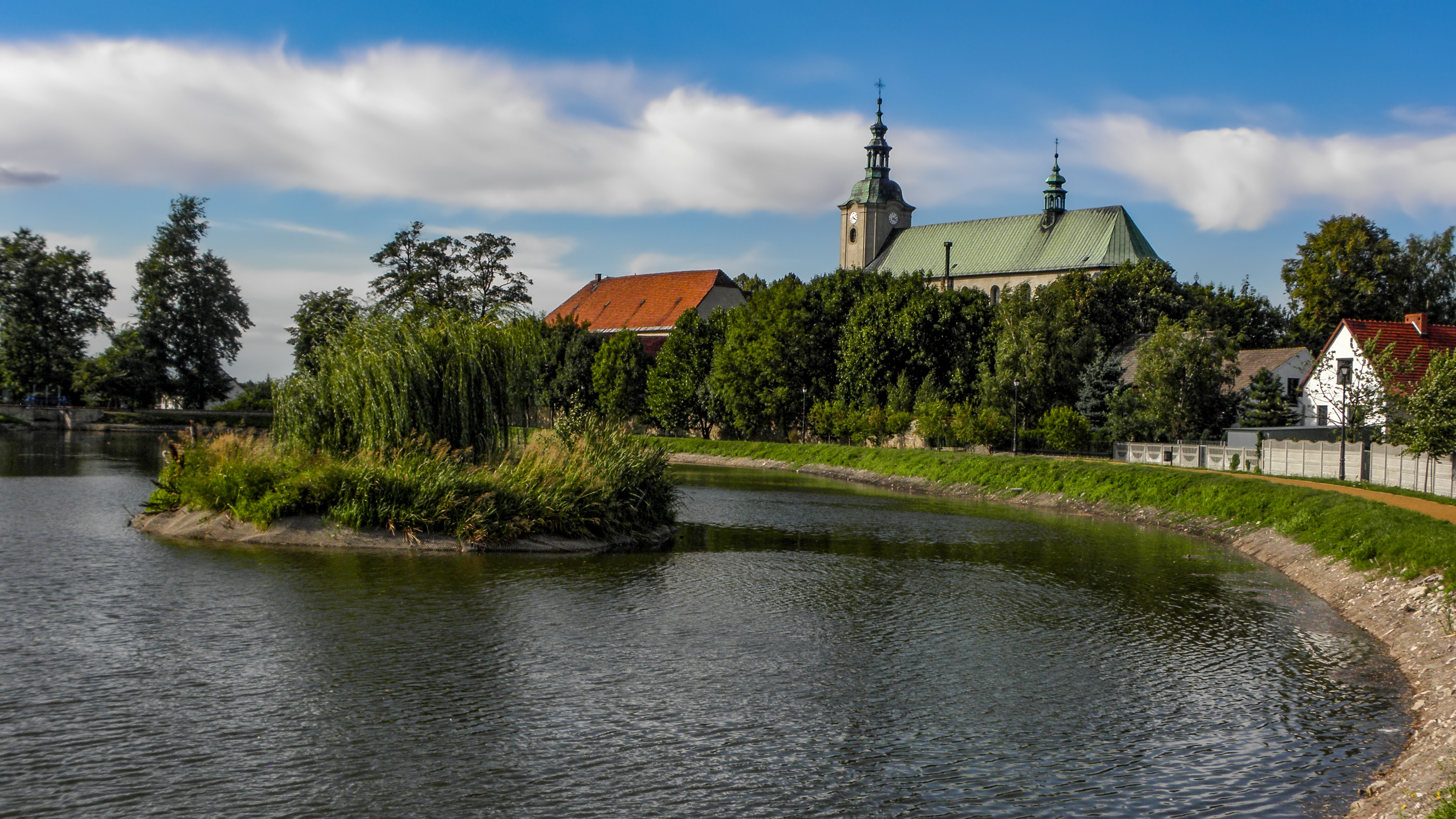
- Village view with Cistercian Abbey

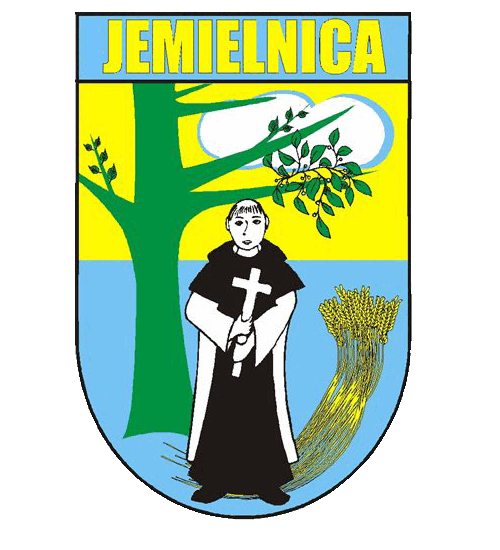
- Coat of arms

- Location within Poland
- Coordinates: 50°32′39″N 18°22′50″E
- Country: Poland
- Voivodeship: Opole
- County: Strzelce
- Gmina: Jemielnica
- First mentioned: 1225
- Elevation: 219 m (719 ft)

Population
  - Total: 3,545
- Time zone: UTC+1 (CET)
  - Summer (DST): UTC+2 (CEST)
- Vehicle registration: OST
- Website: https://jemielnica.pl/

Jemielnica ([jɛmjɛlˈnit͡sa], additional name in German: Himmelwitz) is a village in Strzelce County, Opole Voivodeship, in southern Poland. It is the seat of the gmina (administrative district) called Gmina Jemielnica.

The village, as part of Gmina Jemielnica has been officially bilingual in Polish and German since 2006.

== Etymology ==
The name of the village is of Polish origin and comes from the word jemioła, which means "mistletoe".

== History ==
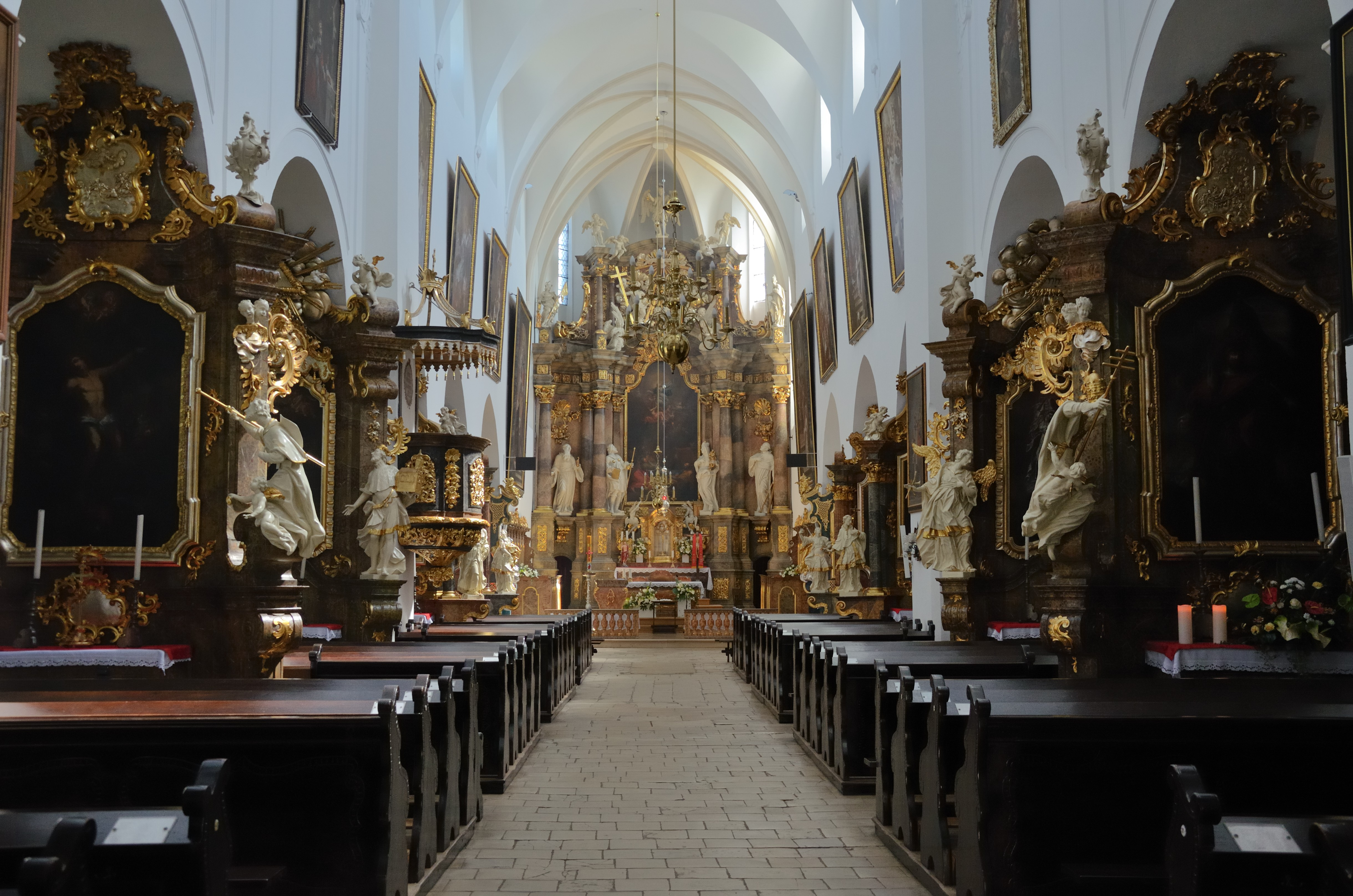
Interior of the Cistercian church

The village was first mentioned as Gemelnici in a document dated 29 November 1225 from the Duchy of Opole within fragmented Piast-ruled Poland that granted the settlement German town law. In 1280 Duke Bolko I of Opole founded the Cistercian Abbey with the assistance of the monastic community of Rudy. In the year 1285 the All Saints' Church was built, which served as the parish church until 1810.

After the death of Duke Bolko I, the town passed to his youngest son Albert, the duke of Strzelce. Like his brothers this came under the suzerainty of the Kingdom of Bohemia in 1327, becoming part of the kingdom after the signing of the Treaty of Trentschin in 1335 by King Casimir III of Poland. With the death of Duke Albert, before 1375 withouts sons, the direct line of the Duchy of Strzelce came to an end, and Jemielnica passed to duke Bolko III. After the childless death of Duke Jan II the Good in 1532, the duchy passed to the Bohemian Crown and was later absorbed by the Habsburg Empire.

After the First Silesian War in 1742 Himmelwitz was ceded along with most of Silesia to Prussia. In 1750 a monastic grammar school was opened, providing local children with access to higher education. In 1810 the Prussian government secularized the monastery and dissolved its holdings. All Saints' Church, formerly the parish church, was made into the cemetery church and the former abbey's Church of the Assumption took its place as parish church.

In 1818 Himmelwitz was incorporated as part of the newly formed Landkreis (county) of Groß Strehlitz, where it remained until 1945. In 1826 the former abbey's holdings were sold to Count Andreas Maria Renard.

One Polish citizen was murdered by Nazi Germany in the village during World War II. By January 1945 the region was occupied by the Red Army, and by April 21 the new Polish administration had tentatively renamed the town Imielnica. After the final defeat of Nazi Germany in World War II, the village was confirmed as part of Poland. Subsequently, the commune was incorporated into the new Silesian Voivodship and renamed Jemielnica on 30 March 1947. In 1950 it was transferred to Opole Voivodship.
