= Bolko I of Opole =

Duke of Opole and of Wieluń

Bolko I
- Duke of Opole, Niemodlin, Strzelce Opolskie
- Born: before 21 October 1258
- Died: 14 May 1313
- Noble family: Silesian Piasts of Opole
- Spouse: Agnes (of Brandenburg?)
- Issue: Bolesław the Elder; Bolko II of Opole; Albert of Strzelce
- Father: Władysław Opolski
- Mother: Euphemia of Greater Poland

Bolko I of Opole (Polish: Bolko I opolski; before 21 October 1258 – 14 May 1313), was a Duke of Opole from 1282 (until 1284 with his brother as co-ruler), Niemodlin and Strzelce Opolskie until his death.

He was the third son of Władysław, Duke of Opole-Racibórz, by his wife Euphemia, daughter of Władysław Odonic, Duke of Greater Poland.

== Life ==
Around 1277 Bolko I was named co-ruler of the Duchy of Opole-Racibórz by his father, despite the fact that he was the third child. After Duke Władysław's death in 1282, Bolko I and his brother Casimir inherited Opole as co-rulers, while his other two brothers, Mieszko I and Przemysław inherited Racibórz also as co-rulers.

The common rule between Bolko I and Casimir lasted two years, until 1284, when the formal division was made of their domains. Bolko I retained the main city of Opole and Casimir received Bytom.

For unknown reasons, Bolko I chose to follow different politics than his brothers and began a close cooperation with Henry IV Probus, Duke of Wrocław. In particular, this was clearly revealed in the long-time conflict between Henry IV and Bishop Thomas II Zaremba: Bolko I actively supported Henry IV's politics (for example, in 1283 the Duke of Opole took part in the Congress of episcopal rulers in Nysa). In 1287, in an ongoing conflict with the Church's secular power, Bolko I made mediation attempts between them and Henry IV prior to a full military victory over the Duke of Wrocław.

On 30 September 1288 Leszek II the Black, Duke of Kraków and Sandomierz died without issue. The first pretenders to the Kraków throne were initially the Duke of Płock, Bolesław II and Henry IV Probus. The military assistance of Dukes Władysław I the Elbow-high of Kuyavia and Casimir II of Łęczyca initially gave the victory to Bolesław II. On 26 February 1289, an unexpected Silesian army under the command of Dukes Henry III of Głogów, Przemko of Ścinawa and Bolko I of Opole attacked Siewierz, counting on the support of the Governor of Kraków, castellan Sulk the Bear (Sułk z Niedźwiedzia). The extremely bloody battle ended with the defeat of the Silesian troops. Duke Przemko of Ścinawa was killed in battle and Bolko I was seriously wounded and captured by Władysław I the Elbow-high, who released him one year later after he paid a large ransom.

On 23 June 1290, Henry IV Probus died unexpectedly, probably poisoned. In his will, he left his inheritance to Dukes Henry III of Głogów and Przemysł II of Greater Poland (some historians supported the theory of Thomas Jurek, who believed that Henry IV's true heir over Wrocław and Kraków was Bolko I). The Duke of Opole then decided on an alliance with King Wenceslaus II of Bohemia. On 17 January 1291 in Olomouc a formal agreement was signed, in which Bolko I, together with Mieszko I and Casimir agreed to fight with his own troops against any enemy of the Přemyslid dynasty. With this treaty, homage was also performed to the Bohemian crown; however, it's unknown if that tribute was only to King Wenceslaus II personally, or was extended to his successors (some historians stated that the homage was made one year later, in 1292). In subsequent years Bolko I actively supported the Polish politics of the Bohemian king. In 1292 the Duke of Opole took part in the expedition at Sieradz against Władysław I the Elbow-high. Once again, war with the Duke of Kuyavia started in 1296, when Bolko I supported Henry III of Głogów in his attempt to conquer Greater Poland.

The close cooperation between the Bohemian Kingdom and Bolko I soon brought to him a significant increase in international political affairs. In 1297, he took part in the coronation of his protector King Wenceslaus II, and was appointed as a mediator in the conflict between the Church hierarchy of Olomouc and Wrocław. One year later (in 1298), the importance of the Duke of Opole reached his apogee, when he was sent to Mainz as a representative of King Wenceslaus II, in the Electors meeting that chose Albert I of Habsburg as a new German King. Later that year, Bolko I supported the expedition against the deposed King Adolf of Nassau.

In 1300 Bolko I took part in the trip of Wenceslaus II to Greater and his coronation as King of Poland. Shortly after, the Duke of Opole's faithful services were rewarded when he was appointed Starost of Kraków.

The extinction of the Přemyslid dynasty in 1306 broke the existing alliance of Bolko I with the Bohemian Kingdom and began to improve the already significantly tightening relations with his neighbors. Soon after the death of King Wenceslaus II, Bolko I could only obtain Wieluń. The Duke of Opole tried to return to the political scene in 1311, at the beginning of the Rebellion of wójt Albert. It's unknown if the Duke heard the complaints of the burghers of Kraków against Władysław I the Elbow-high and appeared in Lesser Poland in April 1312 following his own interests, or just as the new Governor appointed by the new Bohemian King John of Luxembourg. In any event, Bolko I couldn't cope with Wawel Castle and soon returned to Opole, where he imprisoned the leader of the rebellion, wójt (Mayor) Albert.

In internal politics, Bolko I was known mainly for his extraordinary generosity to the Church. In particular, he supported the Cistercian monastery in Jemielnica, and the Franciscan Church, where he built the chapel of St. Anna. He also made the economic development of his Duchy after granted to many localities German laws (Magdeburg Law).

Bolko I died on 14 May 1313 and was buried in the Franciscan church in Opole.

== Marriage and issue ==
By 1280, Bolko I married a certain Agnes (d. by 1301), whose origins are unknown. According to some historians, she was probably the daughter of Margrave Otto III of Brandenburg. In 1278 the engagement of Agnes, daughter of Margrave Otto III to a son of Duke W. (who probably was Władysław Opolski) was approved by King Ottokar II of Bohemia. Other historians rejected this hypothesis. They had three sons:

1. Bolesław the Elder (b. ca. 1293 – d. by 1365).
2. Bolko II (b. bef. 1300 – d. 21 June 1356).
3. Albert (b. aft. 1300 – d. by 25 September 1375).

On the other hand, the Obituary of the Church of St. Vincent in Wrocław showed the existence of a certain "Grzymisława, Duchess of Opole" (Grimizlaua ducissa Opuliensis) who was buried there around 13 September 1286. Her parentage is also unknown, but her name suggests a Russian origin, probably member of the Rurikids. Her title suggests that she was perhaps the first wife of Bolko I, or maybe the wife of Mieszko I of Cieszyn, Bolko I's older brother, or even a different person.

Bolko I of Opole House of Piast Born: before 21 October 1258 Died: 14 May 1313
Regnal titles
Preceded by Władysław	Duke of Opole with Casimir (until 1284); 1282–1313	Succeeded by Bolko II and Albert
Preceded by Wenceslaus II	Duke of Wieluń; 1305–1313	Succeeded by Bolesław the Elder
