= Bolesław the Elder =

- Duke of Wielun, Niemodlin
- Born: c. 1293
- Died: c. 21 March 1365
- Noble family: Silesian Piasts of Opole
- Spouse: Euphemia of Wrocław
- Issue: Bolesław II; Wenceslaus of Niemodlin; Margareta; Anna; Hedwig; Henry of Niemodlin; Judith; Elisabeth
- Father: Bolko I of Opole
- Mother: Agnes (of Brandenburg?)

Bolesław the Elder (c. 1293 – c. 21 March 1365) was a Silesian duke. He was the duke of Wieluń during 1313–1326, duke of Niemodlin from 1313 and ruler of Prudnik from 1336 until his death.

He was the eldest son of Duke Bolko I of Opole by his wife Agnes, probably a daughter of Margrave Otto III of Brandenburg. Bolesław was nicknamed "the Elder" or "First-born" (Pierworodny) in order to distinguish him from his younger brother, who, for unknown reasons, was also named Bolesław (Bolko).

== Life ==
After his father's death in 1313, Bolesław inherited the duchies of Wieluń and Niemodlin. Until 1323, he exercised the guardianship on behalf of his younger brothers, then too youngs for rule by their own. His political career was strongly connected with the House of Luxembourg, rulers of Bohemia. This alliance with the Bohemian Kingdom caused a war between him and Władysław I the Elbow-high, which ended with the loss of Wieluń in 1326.

On 18 February 1327, together with the other Silesian dukes, Bolesław paid homage to King John of Bohemia in Opawa. One year later (in 1328) in order to fulfill his new responsibilities as vassal of Bohemia, he took part in the crusade against the pagan Lithuania. After returning from this expedition, Bolesław followed his sovereign to Prague, where he spent much time.

In 1336, as a reward for his faithful services, the king authorized Bolesław to buy the town of Prudnik with the surroundings villages by the amount of 2,000 fines.

In 1355 Bolesław took part in the trip of King Charles I of Bohemia to Rome, where the latter was crowned Holy Roman emperor.

Bolesław died between 1362 and 1365. His place of burial is unknown.

== Marriage and issue ==
By 29 November 1325, Bolesław married with Euphemia (b. ca. 1312 – d. 21 March aft. 1384), daughter of Duke Henry VI the Good of Wrocław. They had eight children:

1. Bolesław II (b. 1326/35 – d. by 25 June 1368).
2. Wenceslaus (b. 1336/46 – d. June 1369).
3. Margareta (b. bef. 1340 – aft. 12 July 1399), married bef. 1354 to Landgrave Ulrich II of Leuchtenberg.
4. Anna (b. bef. 1342/44 – d. 8 May 1365), a nun at St. Klara, Wrocław.
5. Hedwig (b. bef. 1345 – d. 13 February 1413), Abbess of St. Klara, Wrocław (1379).
6. Henry (b. by 1345 – d. 14 September 1382).
7. Judith (b. bef. 1346 – aft. October 1378), married by 4 August 1359 to Duke Nicholas II of Opawa.
8. Elisabeth (b. 1347/50? – d. aft. 25 June 1366), a nun at St. Klara, Wrocław.

Bolesław the Elder House of Piast Born: c. 1293 Died: c. 21 March 1365
Regnal titles
Preceded by Bolko I	Duke of Wieluń; 1313–1326	Succeeded by Władysław I the Elbow-high
New title	Duke of Niemodlin; 1313–1365	Succeeded by Bolesław II; Wenceslaus; Henry
