= Bolko II of Opole =

Bolko II
- Duke of Opole
- Coat-of-arms of Upper Silesia (Opole, Strzelce, Niemodlin, etc)
- Born: before 1300
- Died: 21 June 1356
- Noble family: Silesian Piasts of Opole
- Spouses: Elisabeth of Świdnica; Margareta?
- Issue: Władysław Opolczyk; Bolko III of Strzelce; Henry of Opole; Kunigunde; Agnes; Elisabeth; Anna
- Father: Bolko I of Opole
- Mother: Agnes (of Brandenburg)

Bolko II of Opole (Polish: Bolesław II opolski; before 1300 – 21 June 1356) was a Duke of Opole from 1313 (with his brother as co-ruler until 1323).

He was the second son of Duke Bolko I of Opole by his wife Agnes, probably a daughter of Margrave Otto III of Brandenburg.

== Life ==
At the time of his father's death in 1313, Bolko II and his youngest brother Albert inherited the Duchy of Opole as co-rulers; but because at that time both were probably minors, they were placed under the care of their older brother, Bolesław the Elder. Bolko II assumed full government over his domains in 1323, and made the formal division of the Duchy with his brother Albert: he received Strzelce Opolskie and Bolko II retained the main city of Opole.

Thanks to his marriage to Elisabeth, daughter of Duke Bernard of Świdnica, Bolko II had a temporary close connection with the Polish King Władysław I the Elbow-high (paternal grandfather of his wife). However, this alliance was short-lived: on 5 April 1327 in Wrocław, he paid homage to King John of Bohemia; he was the last Silesian Duke who became a vassal of Bohemia.

During his rule in Opole, Bolko II focused on the economical development of his domains. He introduced German laws (see Magdeburg Law) in the villages; also, he supported trade and took care of the state of roads, in order to maintain the safety of travelers.

The good economy of his Duchy was used by Bolko II to obtain more lands: in 1351 he bought the towns of Byczyna and Kluczbork from Duke Wenceslaus I of Legnica and the district of Sławięcice from Duke Bolesław of Bytom.

Bolko II was particularly attached to the Franciscan monastery of Opole. Inside the monastery, he built the Chapel of St. Anna, which became the Family vault of the Dukes of Opole. When Bolko II died on 21 June 1356, he was buried there.

== Marriage and issue ==
By 6 May 1326, Bolko II married Elisabeth (ca. 1315 – 8/9 February 1348), daughter of Duke Bernard of Świdnica. They had seven children:

- Władysław (c. 1332 – 18 May 1401).
- Bolko III (c. 1337 – 21 October 1382).
- Henry (before 18 August 1338 – before 23 October 1365).
- Kunigunde (1340 – after 4 July 1372), a nun at St. Klara in Hungary (Alt-Buda).
- Agnes (c. 1341? – after 1 June 1390), wife of Jobst of Moravia, and nun at Stary Sącz.
- Elisabeth (c. 1342/47? – after 25 April 1382), a nun at Trzebnica.
- Anna (c. 1348? – after 12 March 1411), a nun at St. Klara at Wrocław.

Bolko married a second time to a woman whose name is not recorded. The result of his union was a daughter:

- Agnes, who married Jobst of Moravia.

== Footnotes ==
Bolko II of Opole House of Piast Born: before 1300 Died: 21 June 1356
Regnal titles
Preceded by Bolko I	Duke of Opole with Albert (until 1323); 1313–1356	Succeeded by Władysław Opolczyk; Bolko III; Henry
