= Bokowe, Opole Voivodeship =

Bokowe
- Village
- Location within Poland
- Coordinates: 50°34′52″N 18°20′29″E
- Country: Poland
- Voivodeship: Opole
- County: Strzelce
- Gmina: Jemielnica

Bokowe [bɔˈkɔvɛ] is a village in the administrative district of Gmina Jemielnica, within Strzelce County, Opole Voivodeship, in south-western Poland.
