= Bolko III of Strzelce =

Bolko III
- Duke of Opole, Strzelce
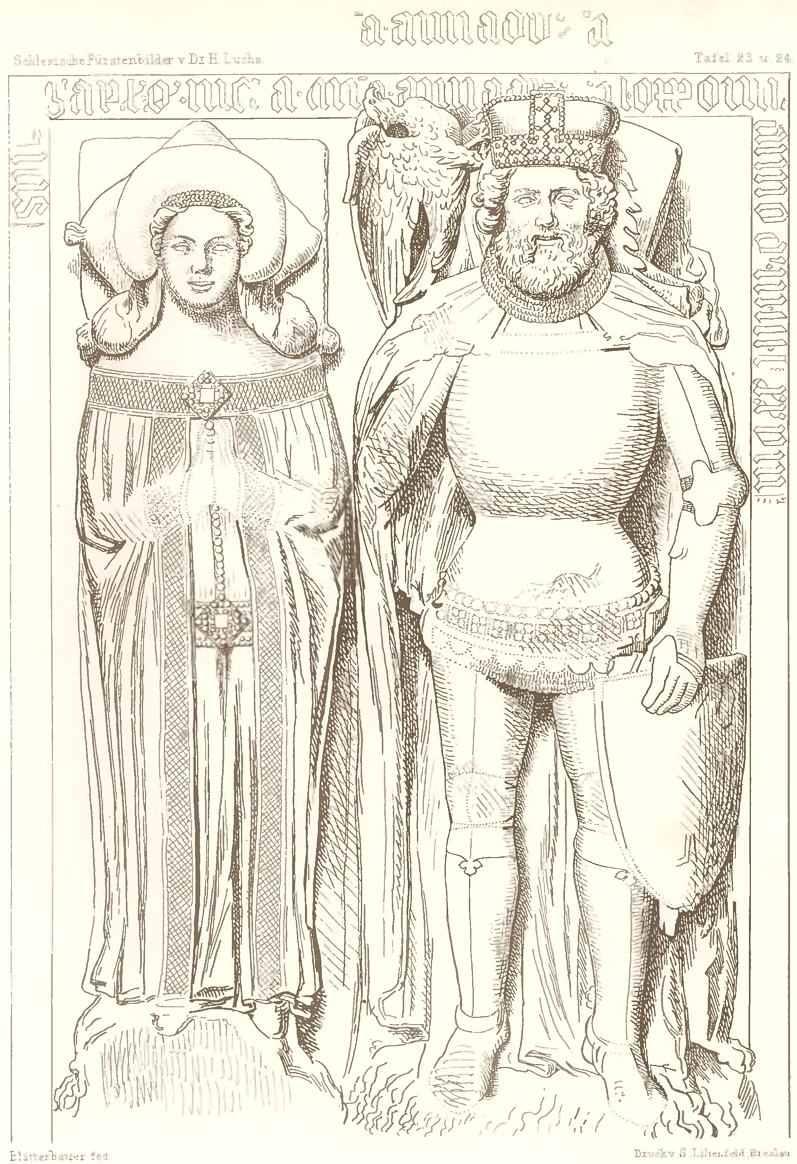
- Tombstone of Bolko III and his wife Anna
- Born: c. 1337
- Died: 21 October 1382
- Noble family: Silesian Piasts of Opole
- Spouse: Anna (of Oświęcim?)
- Issue: Jan Kropidło; Bolko IV of Opole; Henry II of Niemodlin; Bernard of Niemodlin; Anna
- Father: Bolko II of Opole
- Mother: Elisabeth of Świdnica

Bolko III of Strzelce (also known as of Opole; Polish: Bolko III Strzelecki (or Opolski); c. 1337 – 21 October 1382) was a Duke of Opole during 1356–1370 (with his brothers as co-rulers) and Duke of Strzelce from 1375 until his death.

He was the second son of Duke Bolko II of Opole by his wife Elisabeth, daughter of Duke Bernard of Świdnica.

== Life ==
After his father's death in 1356, Bolko III and his brothers Władysław Opolczyk and Henry inherited Opole as co-rulers; however, the full government was held by the oldest brother, Władysław Opolczyk.

The independent rule of Bolko III began only around 1375, when he inherited Strzelce after the death of his uncle Albert without male issue. During his reign, he didn't play any political role.

Bolko III spent much of his time at the courts of King Charles in Prague and King Louis I in Buda. In 1355, Bolko III, with several other Silesian Dukes, went to Italy with King Charles of Bohemia, who came to Rome for his coronation as Holy Roman Emperor; ten years later, in 1365, he made a journey from Luxembourg to Avignon, and in 1377, together with King Louis I of Hungary and Władysław Opolczyk, he made a military expedition to Bełz.

Bolko III died on 21 September 1382 and was buried in the Franciscan chapel of St. Anna in Opole. Upon his death, his title passed to his four sons as co-rulers. Because his sons were minors, their guardianship was held by his uncle Władysław Opolczyk.

== Marriage and issue ==
By 1355, Bolko III married a certain Anna (b. ca. 1340? – d. 8 April 1378), who may have been daughter of Duke Jan I of Oświęcim. They had five children:

1. Jan Kropidło (b. 1360/64 – d. 3 March 1421).
2. Bolko IV (b. 1363/67 – d. 6 May 1437).
3. Henry II (b. 1374 – d. 22 December 1394).
4. Bernard (b. 1374/78 – d. 2/4 April 1455).
5. Anna (b. bef. 8 April 1378 – d. 2 December 1455), Abbess of Trzebnica (1428).

== Footnotes ==
Bolko III of Strzelce House of Piast Born: c. 1337 Died: 21 October 1382
Regnal titles
Preceded by Bolko II	Duke of Opole with Władysław (until 1370) and Henry (until 1365); 1356–1370	Succeeded by Władysław Opolczyk
Preceded by Albert	Duke of Strzelce; 1375–1382	Succeeded by Jan Kropidło; Bolko IV; Henry II; Bernard
