= Niemodlin =

Town in Silesia

Niemodlin Ńymodlin
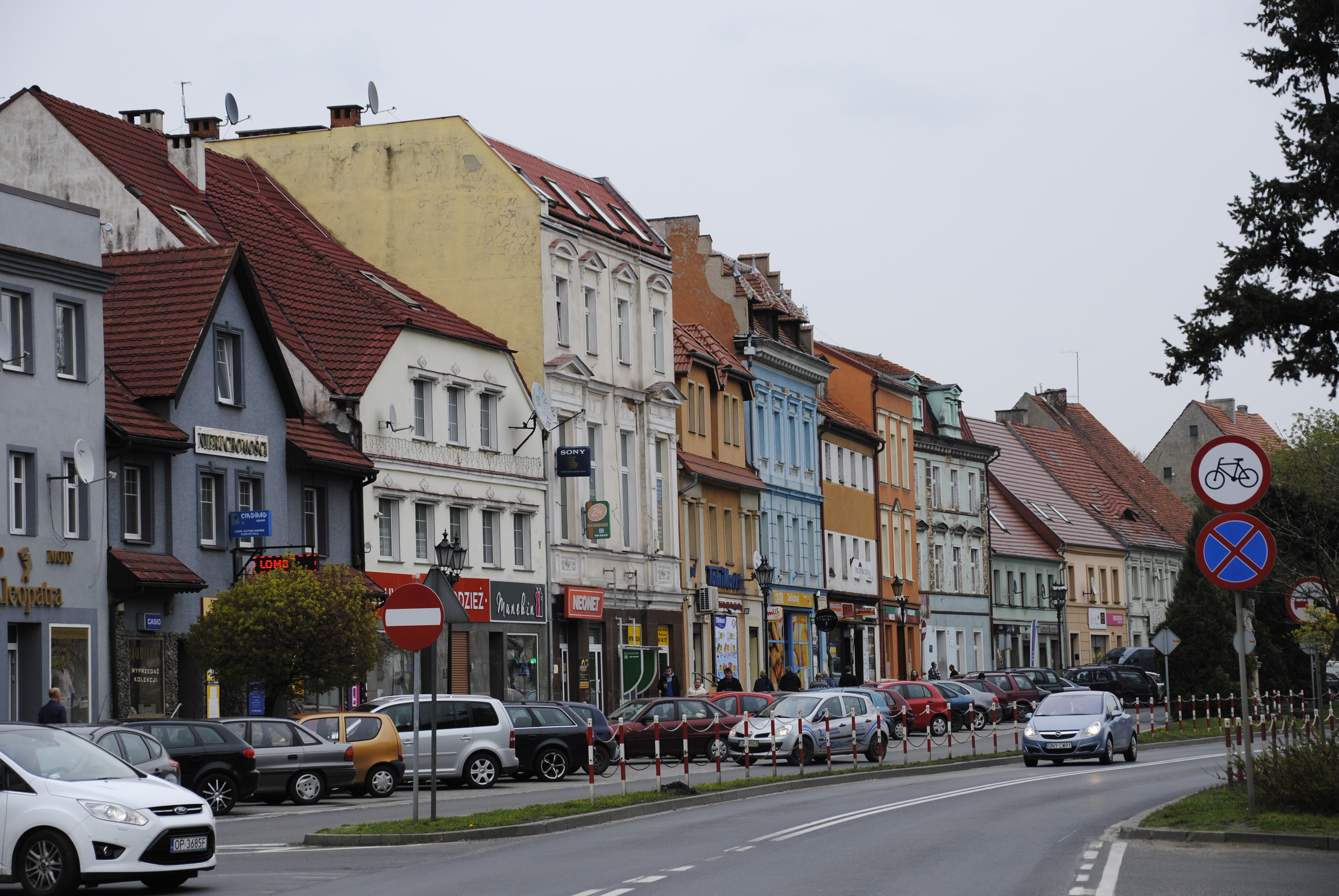
- Historical tenements and architecture at the Market Square

- Flag Coat of arms

- Location within Poland
- Coordinates: 50°38′N 17°36′E
- Country: Poland
- Voivodeship: Opole
- County: Opole
- Gmina: Niemodlin
- First mentioned: 1224
- Town rights: 1283

Area
  - Total: 13.11 km^{2} (5.06 sq mi)
- Elevation: 177 m (581 ft)

Population (2019-06-30)
  - Total: 6,315
  - Density: 481.7/km^{2} (1,248/sq mi)
- Time zone: UTC+1 (CET)
  - Summer (DST): UTC+2 (CEST)
- Postal code: 49-100
- Vehicle registration: OPO
- Website: http://www.niemodlin.pl

Niemodlin (Polish: [ɲɛˈmɔdlin]; Silesian: Ńymodlin; German: Falkenberg O.S.) is a town in Opole County, Opole Voivodeship, in southern Poland, with 6,315 inhabitants (2019).

== History ==
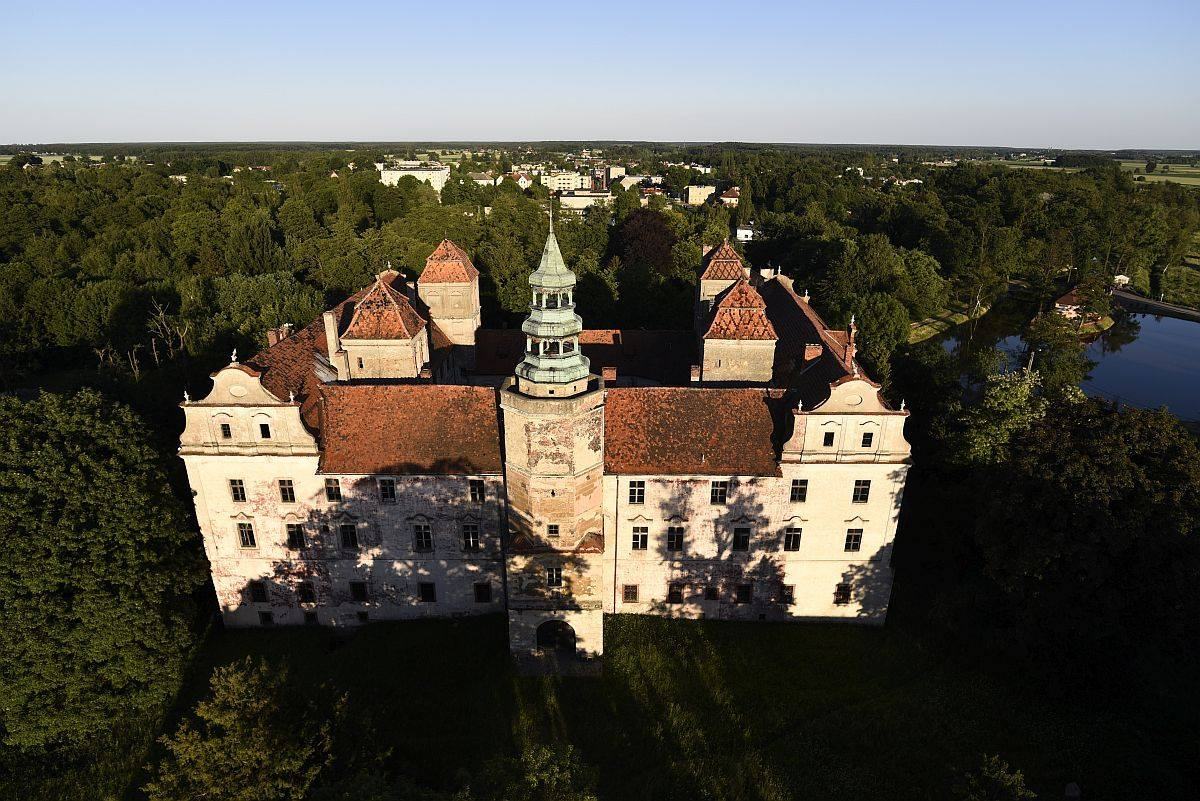
Niemodlin Castle, built in 1313

The community was first mentioned as Nemodlin in a 1224 deed and received town privileges in 1283. The German place-name Falkenberg was first recorded in the year 1290. Originally a part of the Duchy of Opole, after the death of Duke Bolko I, Niemodlin became the capital of a duchy in his own right from 1313 to 1382. When the Opole line of the Piast dynasty became extinct in 1532, various noble families like the Hohenzollern, the House of Zierotin, and the Pražma held the estate (also known as Falkenberg) until the 1940s.

The town of Falkenberg, after the First Silesian War in 1742, had become part of Prussia and was the capital of the Falkenberg district in the Province of Silesia. In the 18th century, Falkenberg belonged to the tax inspection region of Neustadt. In 1871, with the Prussian-led Unification of Germany, the town became part of the German Empire. After Germany's defeat in World War II in 1945, it became again part of Poland. The estate's final owner, Count Frederick Leopold von Praschma, left a Renaissance castle built around 1600, which became offices for the State Repatriation Office, then served as a high school and NCO school.

== Notable residents ==
- Wilhelm Iwan (1871–1958), Lutheran pastor and historian
- Otto Schwarzer (1906–1976), Wehrmacht officer

== People ==
- Friedrich von Praschma (1833-1909), German politician, member of German Reichstag
- Hans Praschma von Bilkau (1867-1935), German politician, member of German Reichstag

== Twin towns – sister cities ==
See twin towns of Gmina Niemodlin.
