= Suszec =

- Village
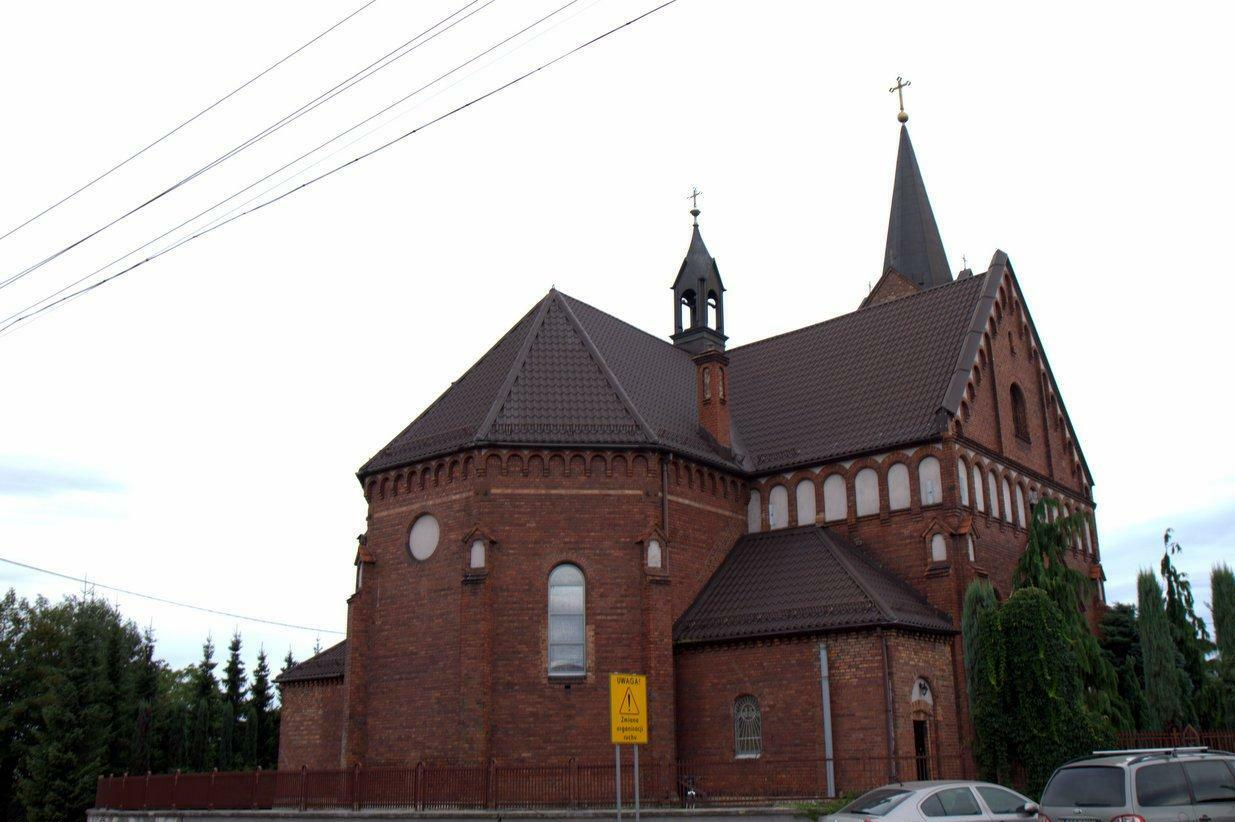
- The Parish of St. Stanislaus the Bishop and Martyr

- Coat of arms

- Location within Poland
- Coordinates: 50°02′16″N 18°47′18″E
- Country: Poland
- Voivodeship: Silesian
- County: Pszczyna
- Gmina: Suszec
- First mentioned: 1326
- Population: 4,491
- Website: http://www.suszec.pl

Suszec [ˈsuʂɛt͡s] (German Sussetz) is a village in Pszczyna County, Silesian Voivodeship, in southern Poland. It is the seat of the gmina (administrative district) called Gmina Suszec.

In the area of the village there is the Parish of St. Stanislaus the Bishop and Martyr and Krupiński Coal Mine.

In 2004. Suszec won the first edition of the competition "Beautiful Village of Silesian Voivodeship" in the category "most beautiful village".

== Name ==
The name derives from the Polish term for a lack of water—suchość (dryness)—and is likely related to the village's location on dry ground situated among swamps and marshes. In his 1888 work on Silesian place names published in Wrocław, German linguist Heinrich Adamy lists the oldest known name of the village in the Polish form Susza, translating its meaning as Trockenfeld ("dry field"). The name was later phonetically Germanized, initially to Sussetz, and in modern times to Sissetz.

== Parts ==
Integral parts of the village of Suszec
SIMC	Name	Type
0222189	Branica	hamlet
0222114	Grabówka	part of the village
0222120	Owczarnia	part of the village
0222137	Podlesie	part of the village
0222143	Siągarnia	part of the village
0222150	Sikowiec	part of the village
0222166	Stary Suszec	part of the village
0222172	Żabiniec	part of the village

== History ==
The village was first mentioned in 1326 in the register of Peter's Pence payment among Catholic parishes of Oświęcim deaconry of the Diocese of Kraków as Susechz.

During the political upheaval caused by Matthias Corvinus the land around Pszczyna was overtaken by Casimir II, Duke of Cieszyn, who sold it in 1517 to the Hungarian magnates of the Thurzó family, forming the Pless state country. In the accompanying sales document issued on 21 February 1517 the village was mentioned as Sussecz. The Kingdom of Bohemia in 1526 became part of the Habsburg monarchy. In the War of the Austrian Succession most of Silesia was conquered by the Kingdom of Prussia, including the village.

In January 1945, the so-called death marches from the Auschwitz-Birkenau camp in Oświęcim to the railroad station in Wodzisław Śląski passed through the village.

The coat of arms of Suszec, dating back to at least the late 18th century, features a spreading tree, which has also served as the coat of arms for the entire municipality (gmina) since 1994.

From 1954 to 1972, the village served as the seat of the Suszec cluster (gromada) authorities. Between 1975 and 1998, it was administratively part of the Katowice Voivodeship.

== Tourism and recreation ==
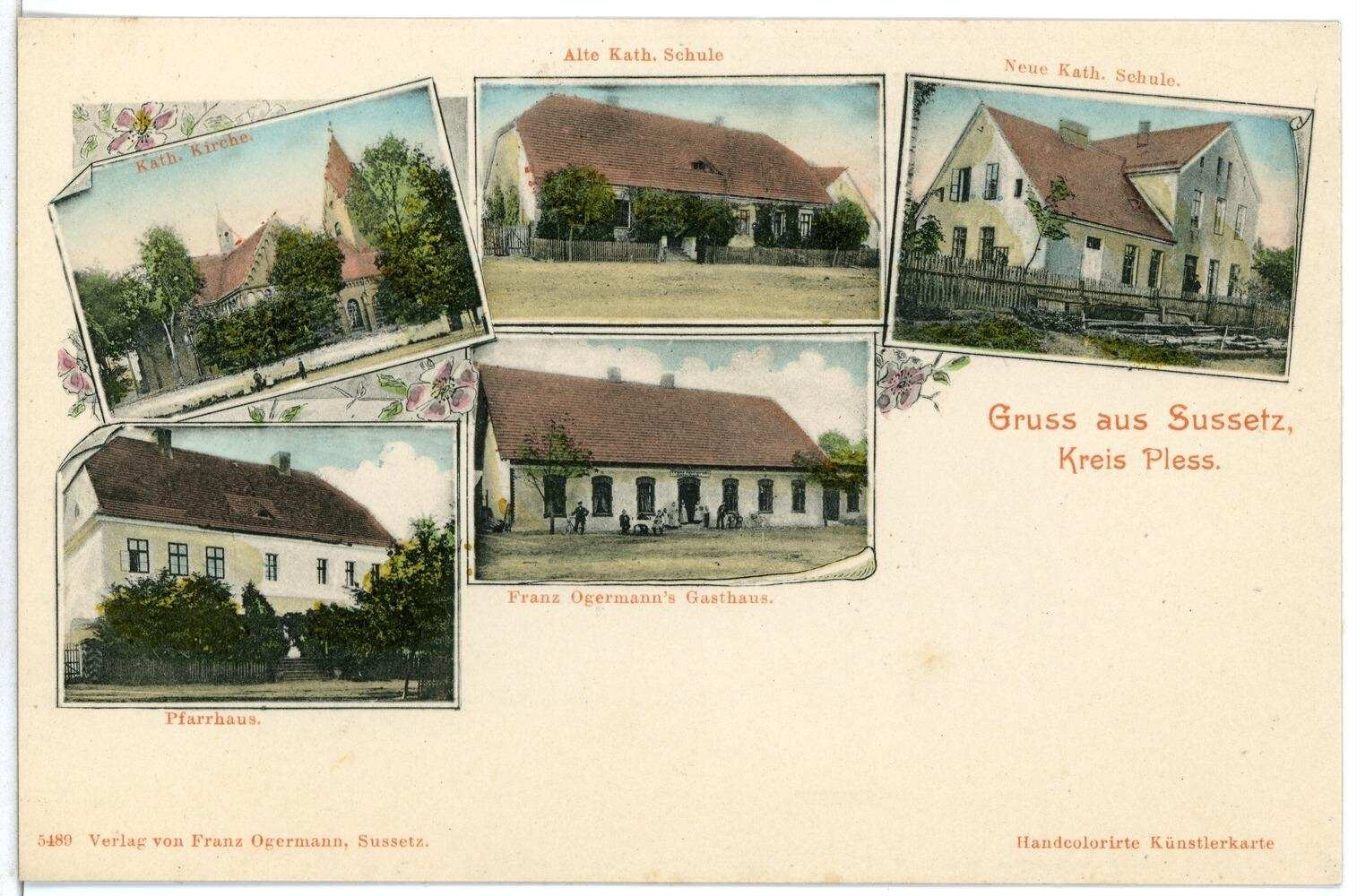
A postcard from Suszec in German, 1904.

The area of the Suszec commune is surrounded on all sides by foreststhe remains of the so-called Pszczyna Forest, protecting the commune from pollution from the nearby urban agglomerations. Part of the forests in the area of Suszec and Rudziczka belongs to the landscape park (and park buffer zone) "Rudy Landscape Park". Moreover, in the northern part of the commune there is a "Babczyna Dolina Nature Reserve".

To the southwest of the village there is a recreation and holiday center "Gwaruś", which belongs to the commune. It was established on the basis of one of the oldest ponds in here with the area of 9.3 ha. In 1983, in the area of the pond, works were commenced with the aim of building a recreation center of the Krupiński Coal Mine in Suszec; to this end, the existing reservoir was divided into two smaller ones (the eastern one - recreation and the western one - breeding). The works were completed in 1986 and the pond "Godziek" was renamed to "Gwaruś" (the first name "Godziek" came from the name of the first owner from the 15th century - Godźek). Since 1999 the whole center has been managed by the Communal Cultural Centre and the Municipal Office in Suszec (GOK). Since 2017. "Gwaruś" with the adjacent land was leased by a private company.

== Notable people from Suszec ==
- Dawid Godziek – Polish cyclist competing in BMX Dirt and MTB Slopestyle disciplines. Two-time X-Games gold medalist (2018, 2022) in the BMX Dirt event. World champion in MTB Slopestyle.
- Franciszek Błażyca – a foreman of the Silesian Province Police, one of the victims of the Katyn massacre.

== Sister municipalities ==
Suszec has two sister cities:

- Zákamenné, Slovakia
- Novoť, Slovakia
