= Branica (Suszec) =

Village in Suszec, Poland

Coordinates: 50°01′36″N 18°49′55″E

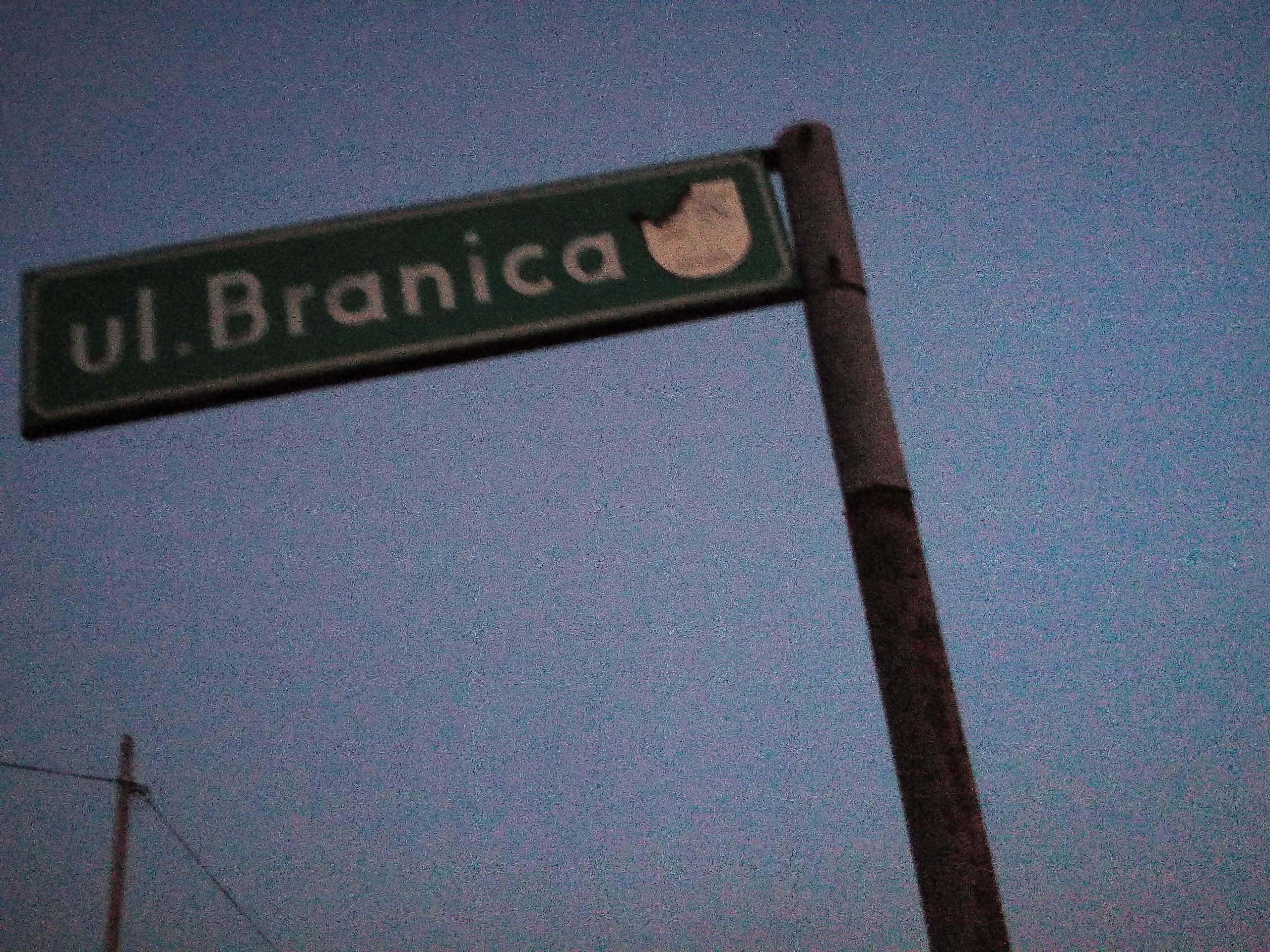
The sign 'Branica'

Branica is a hamlet of the Suszec village in Poland, located by the provincial road No. 935 in the Silesian Voivodeship, in the Pszczyna County, in the Gmina Suszec.

In 1975–1998, the hamlet administratively belonged to the Katowice Voivodeship. The followers of the Roman Catholic Church belong to the parish of St. Stanisław Bishop and Martyr (pol. Św. Stanisława Biskupa i Męczennika) in Suszec. There is also a primary school named after Janusz Korczak.

== Branicka Maryjka ==
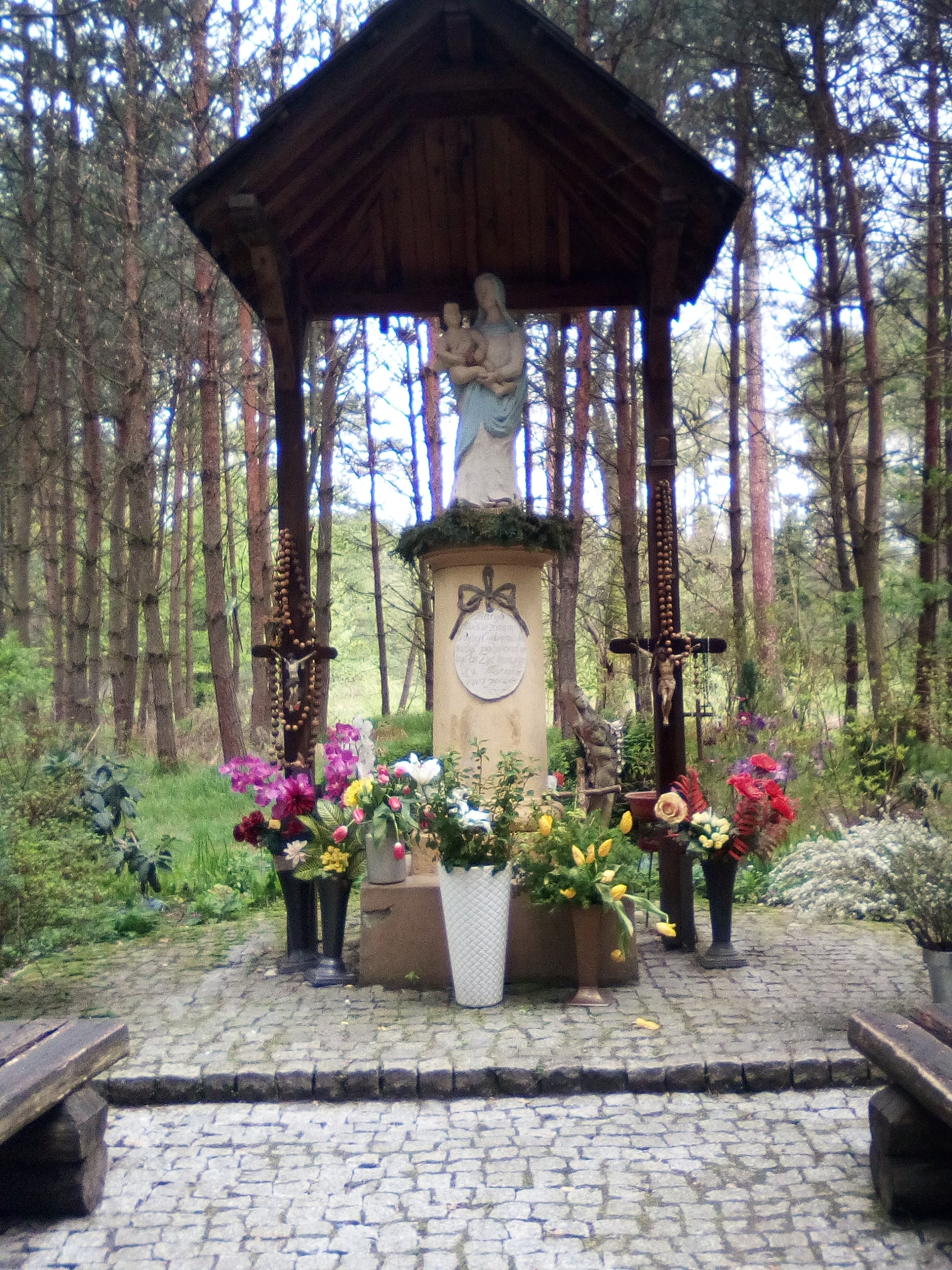
'Maryjka Branicka'

In Branica, by the Suszec-Kobiór road, there is a figurine representing Mary, mother of Jesus and Christ.

== See also ==
- Battle of Pszczyna
