= Babczyna Dolina Nature Reserve =

Polish forest nature reserve

- Rezerwat przyrody Babczyna Dolina
- IUCN category V (protected landscape/seascape)
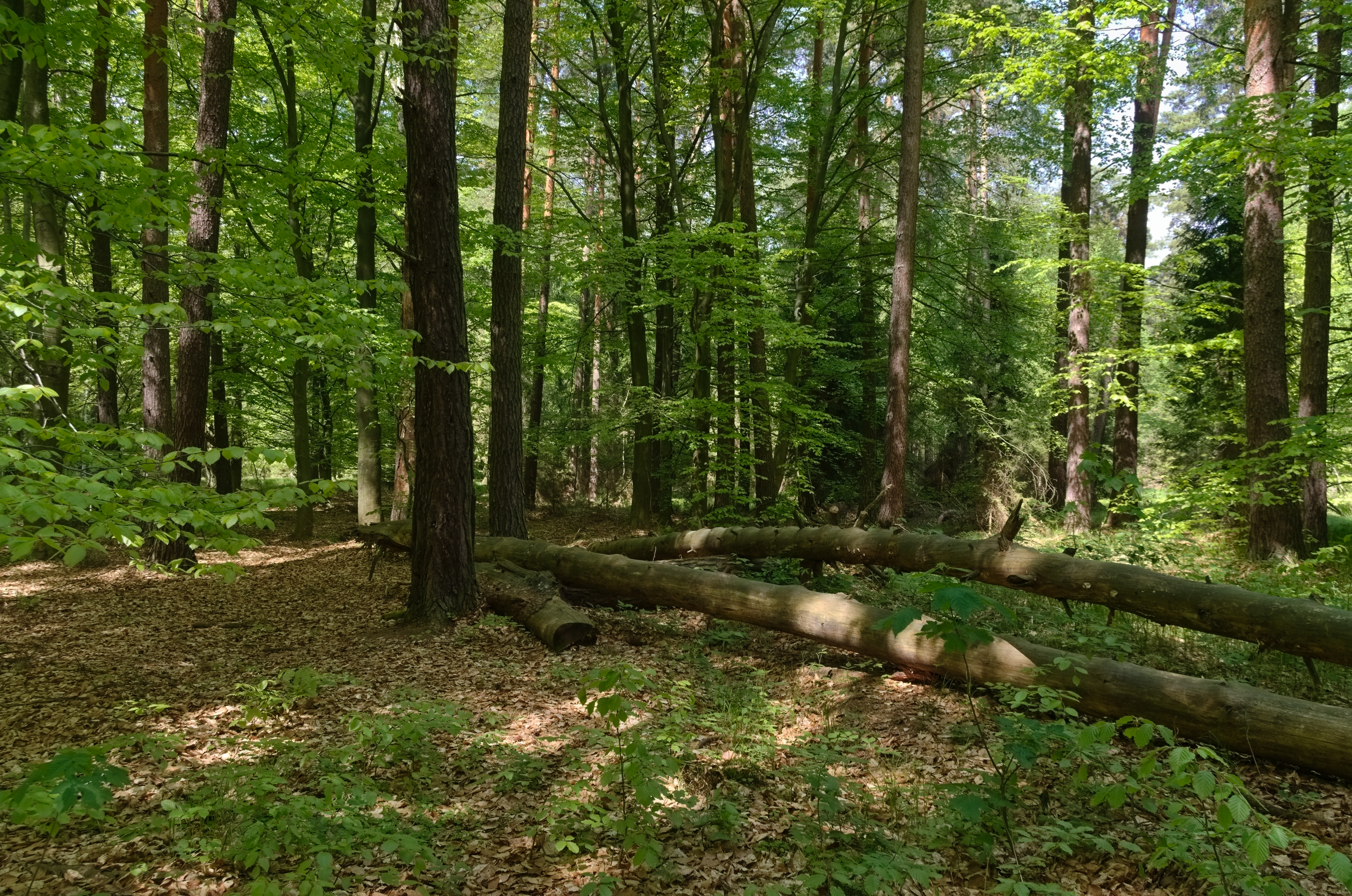
- Interactive map of Babczyna Dolina Nature Reserve
- Location: Silesian Voivodeship
- Coordinates: 50°03′18″N 18°53′06″E
- Area: 76.25 ha (188.4 acres)
- Established: 2002

Babczyna Dolina Nature Reserve is a forest nature reserve with an area of 76.25 ha, located in Silesian Voivodeship, in the Pszczyna County, in the Gmina Suszec.

The reserve is under so called strict (ochrona ścisła; 47.56 ha) and active (ochrona czynna; 28.69 ha) protection. It was created on January 31, 2002, by the Silesian Governor's regulation.

The object of protection is a natural complex of Calamagrostio villosae-Pinetum (bór wilgotny trzcinnikowy), which consists of pine with an admixture of spruce, oak, silver birch and downy birch, as well as beech and fir. The dominant species in the undergrowth is Calamagrostis villosa, from which the nature reserve takes its name. In addition there is also peat bog and Sphagno squarrosi-Alnetum (forest complex dominated by black alder or downy birch). There are rare species such as bryophytes, including Nyholmiella obtusifolia, Orthotrichum lelli and the liverwort Frullania dilatata, as well as other hygrophytes and hydrophytes. It is also a home for many animal species, including viviparous lizard (Zootoca vivipara), slowworms (Anguis), grass snake (Natrix natrix), and pool frog (Pelophylax lessonae).
