= Krupiński Coal Mine =

Closed coal mine in Suszec, Poland

Krupiński coal mine in Suszec
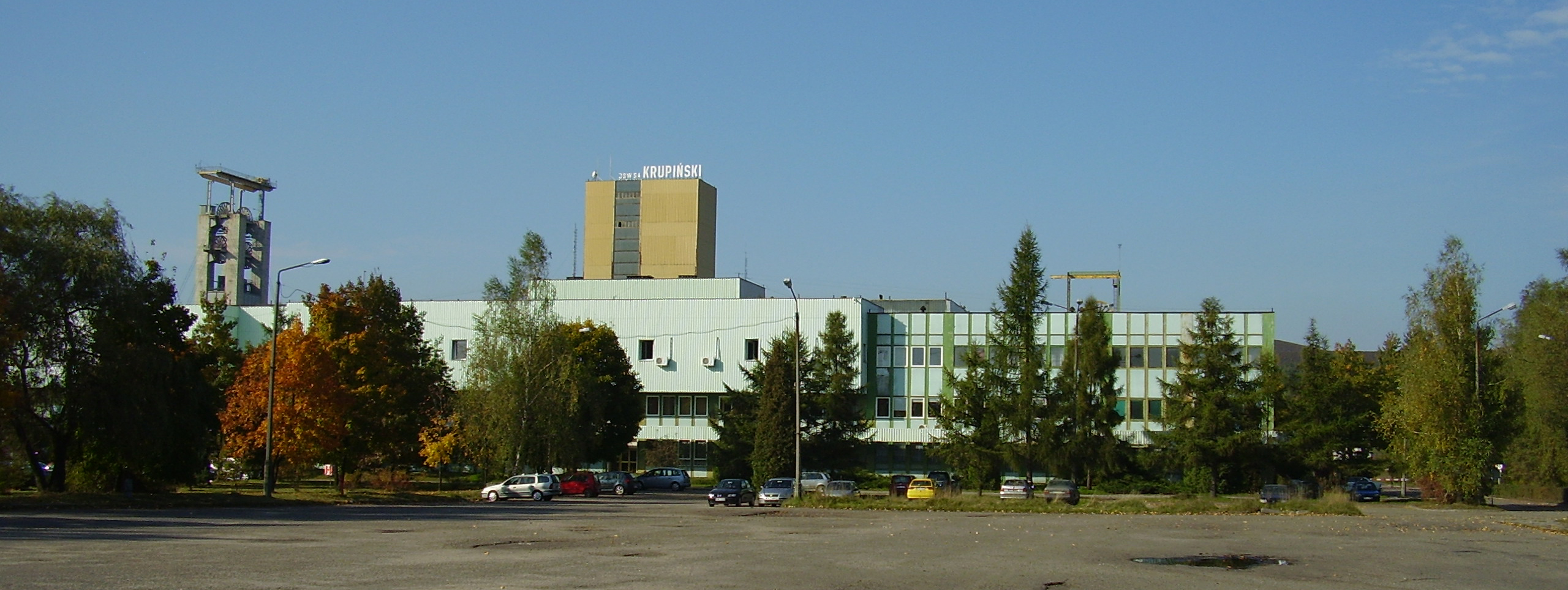

- Poland
- Location: Suszec, Silesian Voivodeship, Poland; 50°02′52″N 018°46′29″E
- Products: Coal
- Production: 3,000,000
- Opened: 1983
- Company: Jastrzębska Spółka Węglowa

The Krupiński coal mine is a large mine in the south of Poland in Suszec, Silesian Voivodeship, 448 km south-west of the capital, Warsaw. Krupiński represents one of the largest coal reserve in Poland having estimated reserves of 34.8 million tonnes of coal. The annual coal production is around 3 million tonnes. The mine is based in Suszec, the deposits of which are located in the commune of Suszec, Żory and Orzesze in the Silesian Voivodeship. Employment at the end of 2011 amounted to 2819 employees. March 31, 2017 production in the mine was shut down and the plant was transferred to the Spółka Restrukturyzacji Kopalń in Bytom. This company is liquidating and managing the assets of liquidated mines.

== History ==
The construction of the mine began in 1975 in the mining area covering the areas of Kleszczów, Rudziczka, Suszec and Kryry. During the construction, the mine was called "Suszec". In 1983, it was transferred, and operated with the name "Krupiński", eponymizing the Polish mining and geology professor Bolesław Krupiński. As of ..., its owner was Jastrzębska Spółka Węglowa SA.

In the years 1983 - 2010, about 420.6 km of corridor workings were hollowed out. 115 longwall plots were exploited in 15 decks. About 47.1 million tons of coal were extracted.

The mine is served by the District Mining Rescue Station in Wodzisław Śląski.

In March 2017, the Krupiński mine was transferred to Spółka Restrukturyzacji Kopalń.

=== Accidents ===
- In 2008 (on July 31) an accident killed a 30-year-old miner, who was hit by a mass of coal detaching from the mining wall.
- In 2009 (July 22), a 44-year-old miner died, having fallen into the tensioning station of the belt conveyor.
- In 2011, (May 5), methane ignition occurred; a miner and two others took part in the rescue operation.
- In 2012:
  - On April 18, a 26-year-old employee of another company was killed in the mine; during the drilling of new pavement, at the depth of 420 m, caught by part of the drilling machinery.
  - On July 20, a 45-year-old miner died in the mine, having suffered a head injury while performing routine control of the skip shaft.

== Exp...loit ...ation data ==
Basic data about the mine:
Mine	Net daily mining	Mining area	Operational resources	Type of coal	Duration of operation without strategic investments	Period of operation in the implementation of strategic investments
Krupiński	8 100 t per day	27,2 km^{2}	21.4 million tons	34.1, 34.2	to 2020	to 2030
