= Kobielice, Silesian Voivodeship =

Kobielice
- Village
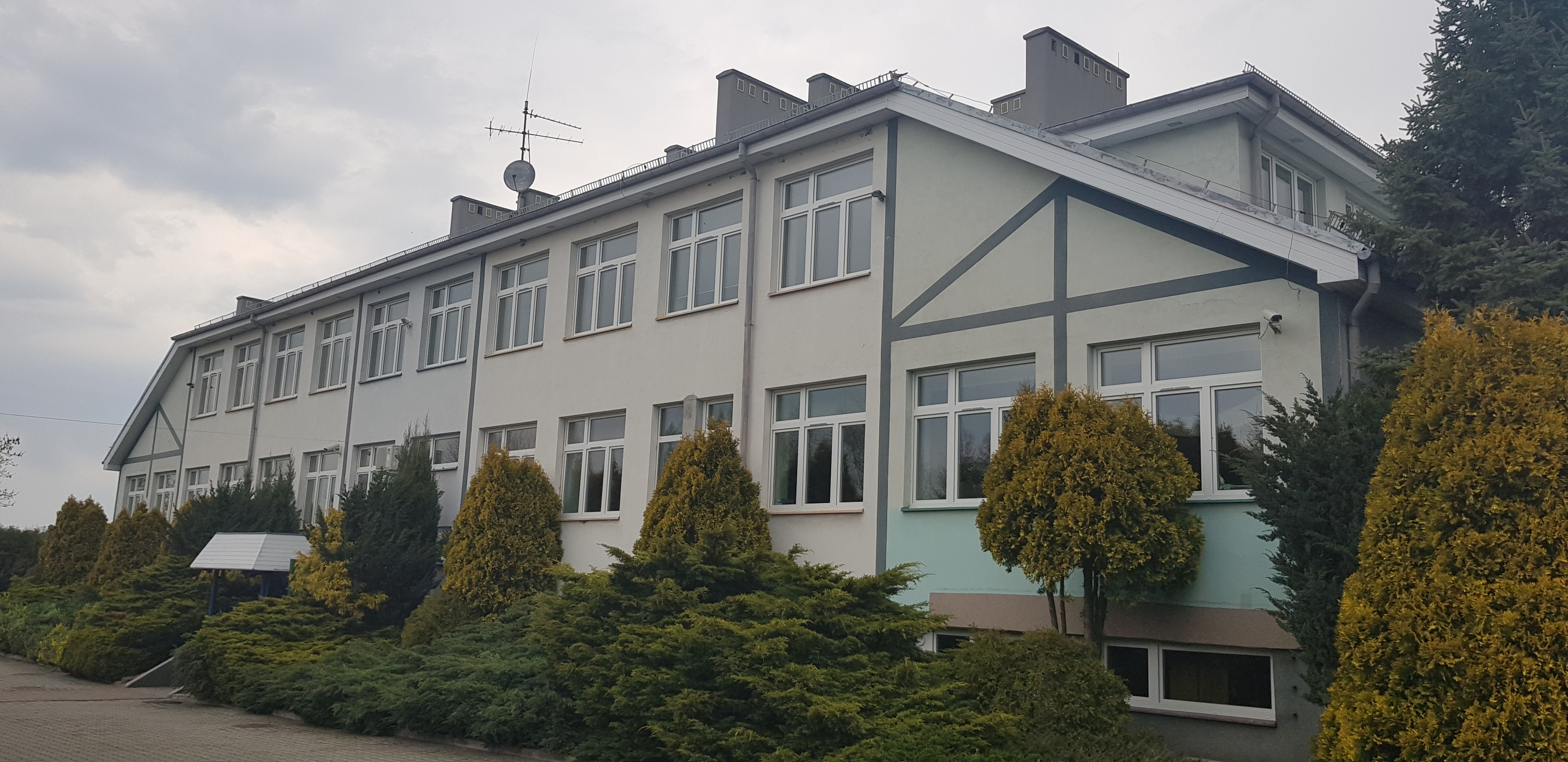
- Primary school in Kobielice

- Location within Poland
- Coordinates: 50°0′N 18°51′E
- Country: Poland
- Voivodeship: Silesian
- County: Pszczyna
- Gmina: Suszec

Population
  - Total: 1,100
- Time zone: UTC+1 (CET)
  - Summer (DST): UTC+2 (CEST)
- Vehicle registration: SPS

Kobielice [kɔbjɛˈlit͡sɛ] is a village in the administrative district of Gmina Suszec, within Pszczyna County, Silesian Voivodeship, in southern Poland.

== History ==
During the German invasion of Poland which started World War II, on 3 September 1939, German troops carried out an execution of three Polish youngsters in Kobielice (see Nazi crimes against the Polish nation).
