= Stara Wieś, Pszczyna =

Stara Wieś
- District of Pszczyna
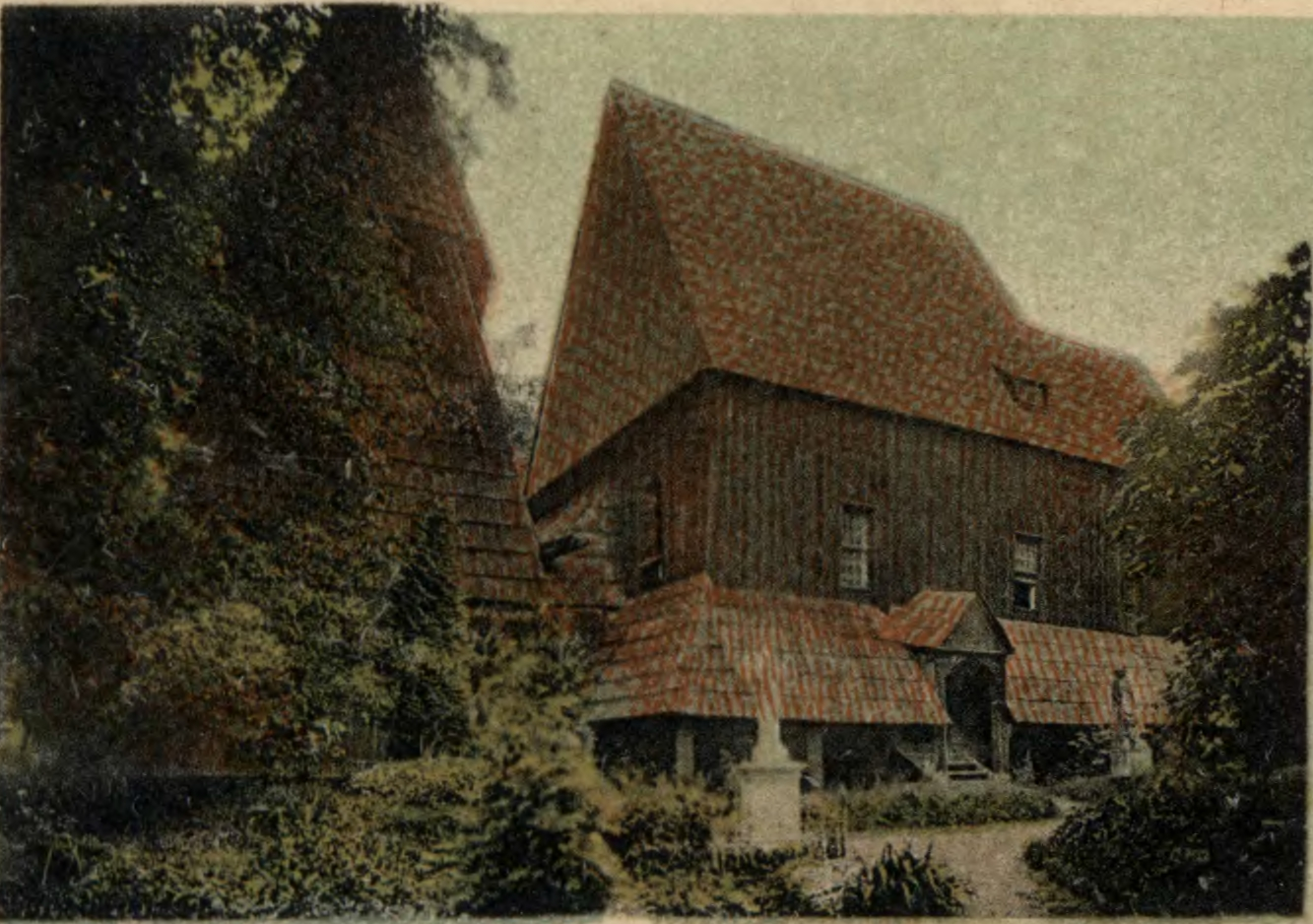
- Old Saint Hedwig church in 1905

- Location within Silesian Voivodeship Location within Poland
- Coordinates: 49°59′18.6″N 18°55′43.1″E
- Country: Poland
- Voivodeship: Silesian
- County: Pszczyna
- Gmina: Pszczyna
- Town: Pszczyna
- Time zone: UTC+1 (CET)
  - Summer (DST): UTC+2 (CEST)
- Vehicle registration: SPS

Stara Wieś (German: Altdorf; both literally Old Village) is a dzielnica (district) of Pszczyna, Silesian Voivodeship, southern Poland.

== History ==
The name meaning old village and arrangement of buildings indicates that it is the site of probable small gord and wooden church, around which the original settlement of Pszczyna evolved before the modern Pszczyna was founded in the second half of the 13th century. In the late 13th century a large settlement campaign took place on the territory of what would later be known as Upper Silesia. At that time new buildings were erected in a different arrangement than of the old settlement around the Saint Hedwig church. This church could have existed already about the year 1200. It was later a filial church of Pszczyna parish.

After the fragmentation of Poland, the village belonged initially to the Seniorate Province of Poland and was part of the land of the Diocese of Kraków (thus of Lesser Poland) that was ceded by Duke Casimir II the Just to Mieszko I Tanglefoot around 1177, who adjoined it to the Duchy of Racibórz. The duchy became in 1327 a fee of the Kingdom of Bohemia, which after 1526 became a part of the Habsburg monarchy.

The village was first mentioned in 1408 as Aldedorf. During the political upheaval caused by Matthias Corvinus the land around Pszczyna was overtaken by Casimir II, Duke of Cieszyn, who sold it in 1517 to the Hungarian magnates of the Thurzó family, forming the Pless state country. In the accompanying sales document issued on 21 February 1517 the village was mentioned as Starowes. In the following years it was then scribed as Aldendorff (1536), Aldendorf (1572).

In the War of the Austrian Succession most of Silesia was conquered by the Kingdom of Prussia, including the village, which was hence known as Aldorf. From 1871, it was also part of Germany.

After World War I in the Upper Silesia plebiscite 740 (65.3%) out of 1153 voters in Stara Wieś voted in favour of rejoining Poland, which just regained independence, against 411 (34,7%) opting for staying in Germany. The village, then known as Starawieś, became a part of autonomous Silesian Voivodeship in Second Polish Republic. A part of the village around Saint Hedwig church was parted and absorbed by Pszczyna. During the German invasion of Poland, which started World War II in September 1939, the fights destroyed the church. Afterwards, the village was occupied and annexed by Nazi Germany. From November 1942 to April 1943, the German Nazi government operated a forced labour subcamp of the Auschwitz concentration camp in the village. After the war it was restored to Poland. Soon after the rest of the village was absorbed by Pszczyna. In 1981 Stara Wieś became a seat of an independent Catholic parish. In 1990 it regained independence as sołectwo of gmina Pszczyna, but was, despite the protest raised by its inhabitants, again amalgamated with Pszczyna on January 1, 1999.
