= Radostowice =

- Village
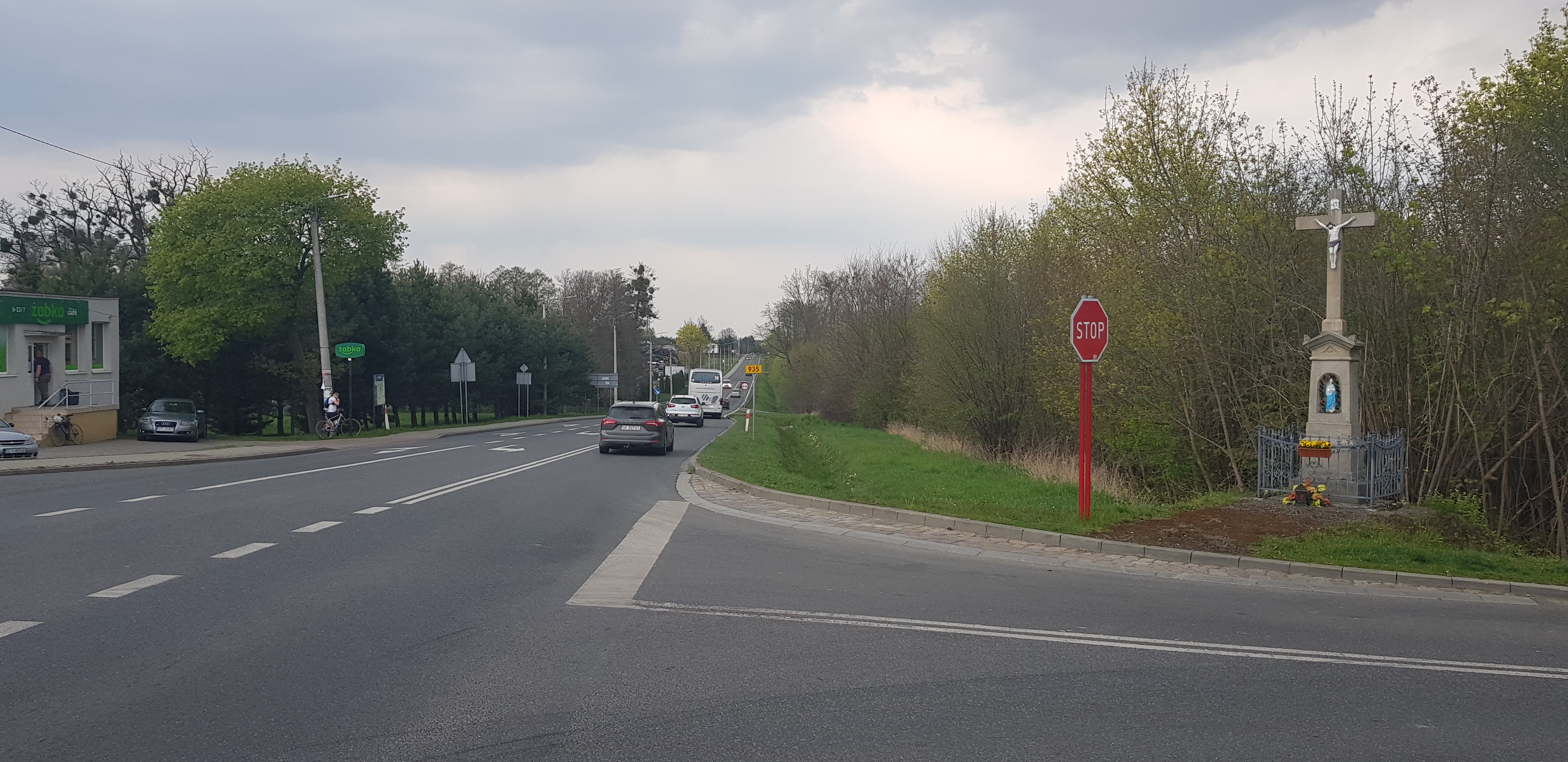

- Coat of arms

- Location within Poland
- Coordinates: 50°1′N 18°54′E
- Country: Poland
- Voivodeship: Silesian
- County: Pszczyna
- Gmina: Suszec

Population
  - Total: 1,500
- Time zone: UTC+1 (CET)
  - Summer (DST): UTC+2 (CEST)
- Vehicle registration: SPS

Radostowice [radɔstɔˈvit͡sɛ] is a village in the administrative district of Gmina Suszec, within Pszczyna County, Silesian Voivodeship, in southern Poland.

== History ==
In the Middle Ages, the area was part of the territory of the Vistulans tribe, one of the Polish tribes. It became part of the emerging Polish state in the 10th century. As a result of the fragmentation of Poland, it was part of the Polish Seniorate Province and Duchy of Racibórz. The village was established in the 14th century. The name of the village comes from the Polish word radość, which means "joy".

Afterwards, the village passed under Bohemian (Czech) suzerainty, and in the 15th century, it became part of the newly formed Duchy of Pszczyna. During the political upheaval caused by Matthias Corvinus the duchy was overtaken in 1480 by Casimir II, Duke of Cieszyn from the Piast dynasty, who sold it in 1517 to the Hungarian magnates of the Thurzó family, forming the Pless state country. In the accompanying sales document issued on 21 February 1517 the village was mentioned as Radostowicze. Along with the Kingdom of Bohemia in 1526 it became part of the Habsburg monarchy. In the War of the Austrian Succession most of Silesia was conquered by the Kingdom of Prussia, including the village, and in 1871 it became part of the German Empire. In 1861, it had a population of 382, mainly Catholics by religion. After World War I, Poland regained independence, and following the subsequent Polish Silesian Uprisings against Germany, the village was reintegrated with the reborn Polish state.

Following the German-Soviet invasion of Poland, which started World War II in September 1939, Radostowice was occupied by Germany until 1945. A local Polish primary school teacher was murdered by the Russians in the Katyn massacre in 1940. In 1942–1943, the German occupiers operated a subcamp of the Auschwitz concentration camp in the village, in which dozens of prisoners were subjected to forced labour.

== Transport ==
The Voivodeship road 935 runs through the village and the National road 1 runs nearby, east of the village.
