= Stary Suszec =

- Village
- Location within Poland
- Coordinates: 50°2′47″N 18°45′52″E
- Country: Poland
- Voivodeship: Silesian
- County: Pszczyna
- Gmina: Suszec

Stary Suszec [ˈstarɨ ˈsuʂɛt͡s] is a village in the administrative district of Gmina Suszec, within Pszczyna County, Silesian Voivodeship, in southern Poland.
