= Mizerów =

- Village
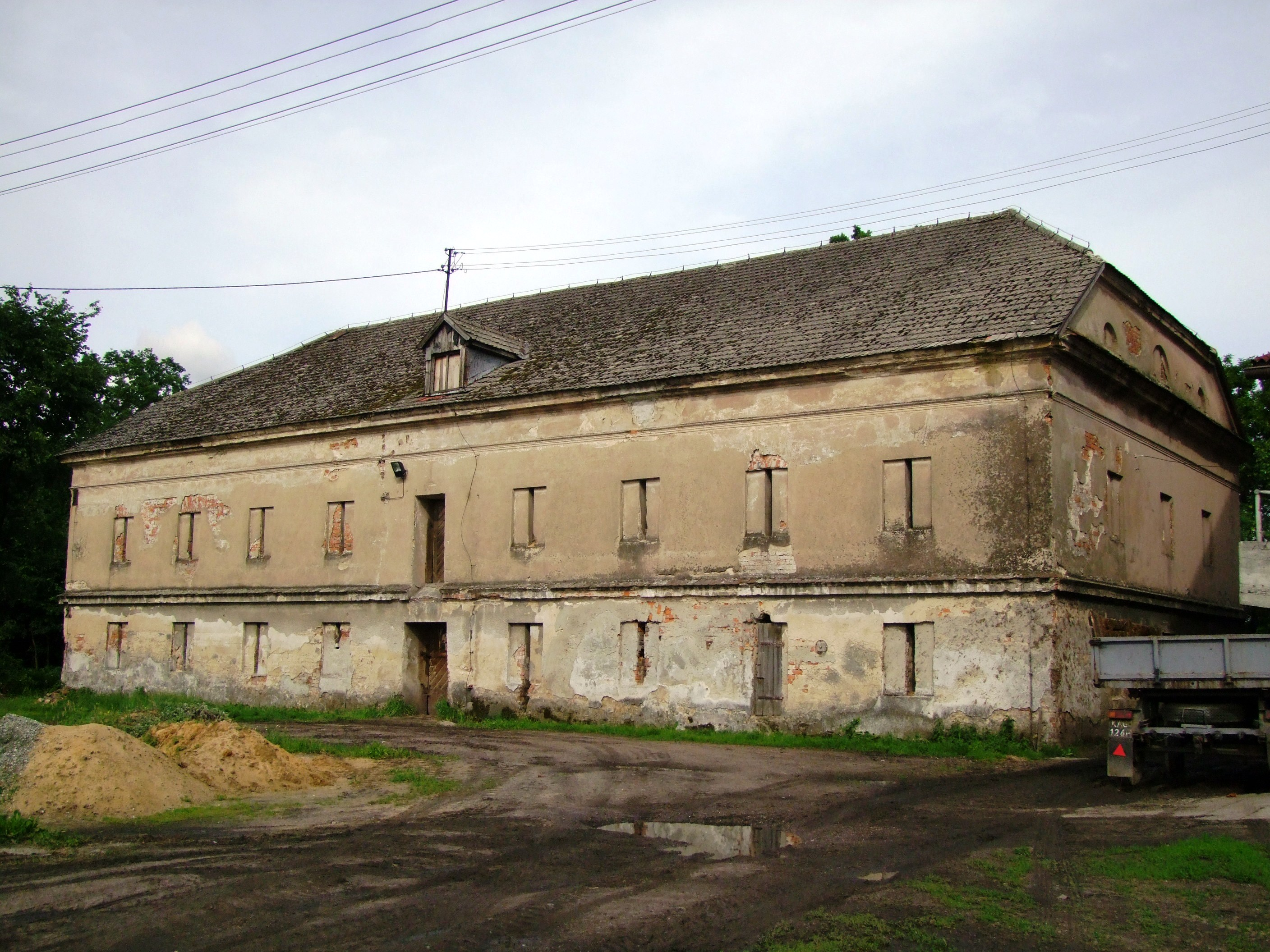
- Granary in Mizerów

- Coat of arms

- Location within Poland
- Coordinates: 49°59′29″N 18°48′32″E
- Country: Poland
- Voivodeship: Silesian
- County: Pszczyna
- Gmina: Suszec
- Population: 1,326

Mizerów [miˈzɛruf] is a village in the administrative district of Gmina Suszec, within Pszczyna County, Silesian Voivodeship, in southern Poland.
