= Parish of St. Stanislaus the Bishop and Martyr =

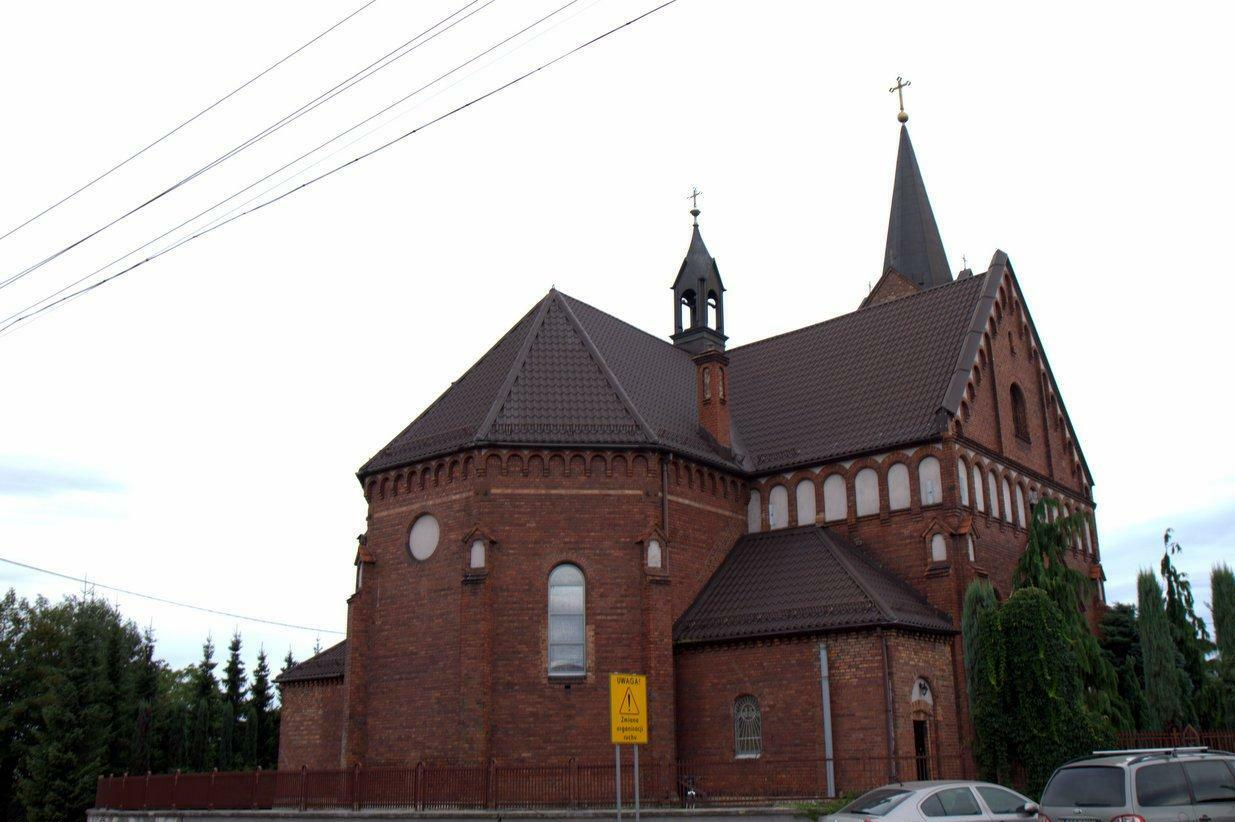
- Parish church
- Parish of St. Stanislaus the Bishop and Martyr
- 50.0384°N 18.7880°E
- Location: Suszec
- Country: Poland

The Parish of St. Stanislaus the Bishop and Martyr is a Catholic parish in the Suszec deanery in Poland.

== History ==
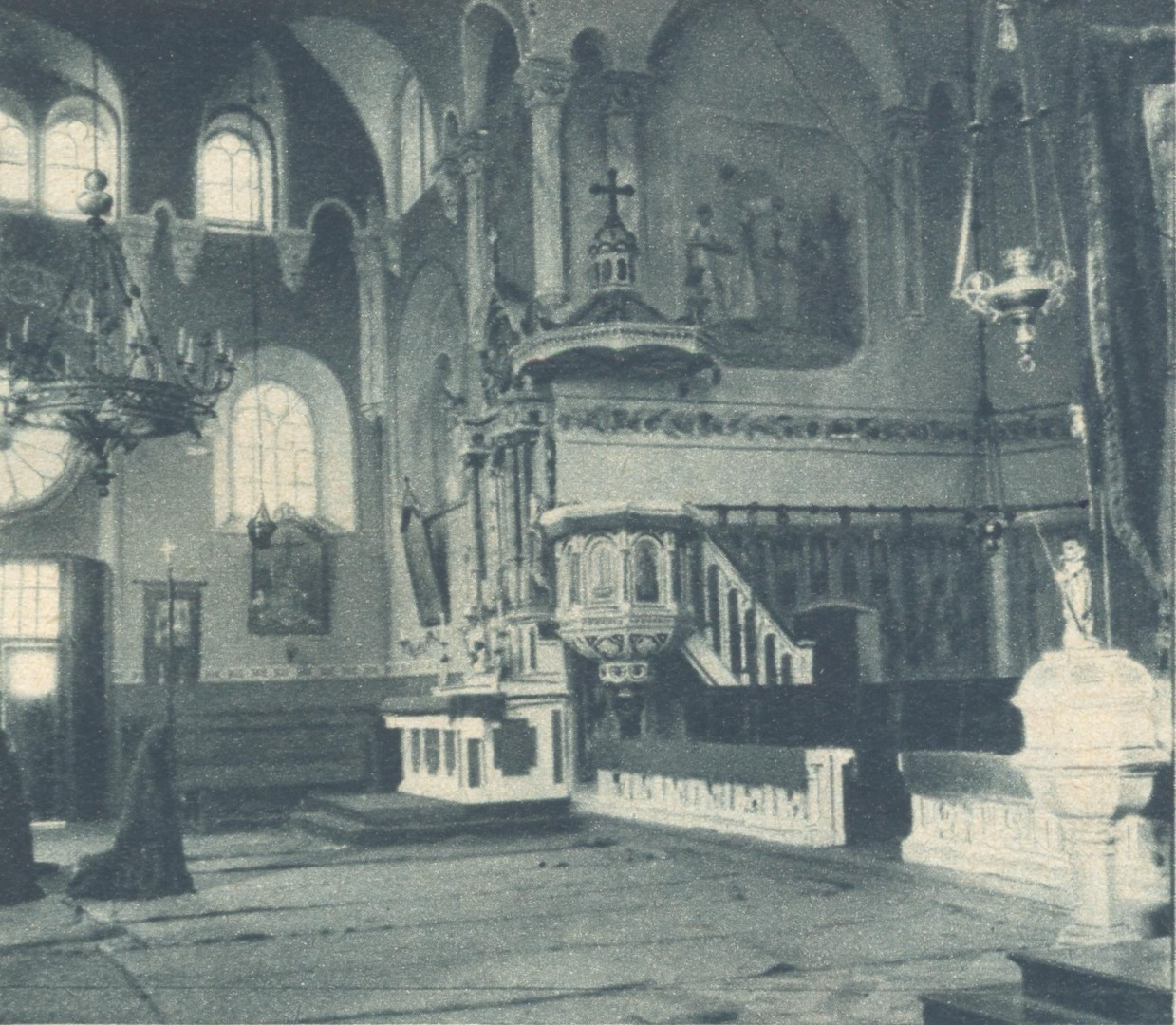
Former decoration of the church in Suszec before the Second Vatican Council

The parish was first mentioned in the 1326 register of the Oświęcim deanery of the Kraków diocese as Susechz and again in 1327 as Susecz. In the next censuses of feast days from 1346 to 1358 Susecz, Susecz, Suczecz. Around 1350 the Pszczyna deanery was created and it was subordinate to the diocese of Kraków until 1821, when by virtue of the papal bull De salute animarum of 17 July it was attached to the diocese of Wrocław.

In November 1598, a church inspection (the first after the Council of Trent) of the Pszczyna deanery was conducted by the archdeacon of Kraków, Krzysztof Kazimirski, commissioned by bishop Jerzy Radziwiłł. According to the report, the church in Villa Susiecz was in the hands of Lutherans.

In 1693 the main altar was consecrated to St. Stanislaus, but since 1703 there have been paintings of the Apostles James the Great and Philip. The right altar was then dedicated to the Mother of God, and the left one to St. Barbara. On the tower hung two bronze bells: St. Stanislaus and St. John of Nepomuk.

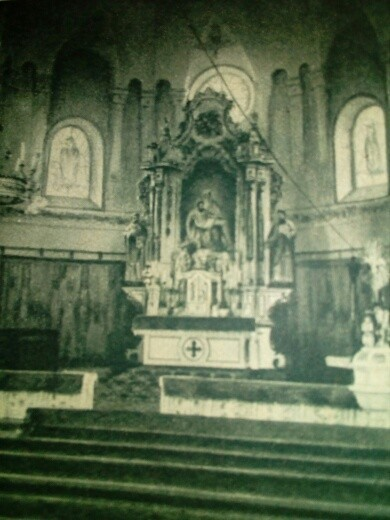
Old altar, removed after the Second Vatican Council

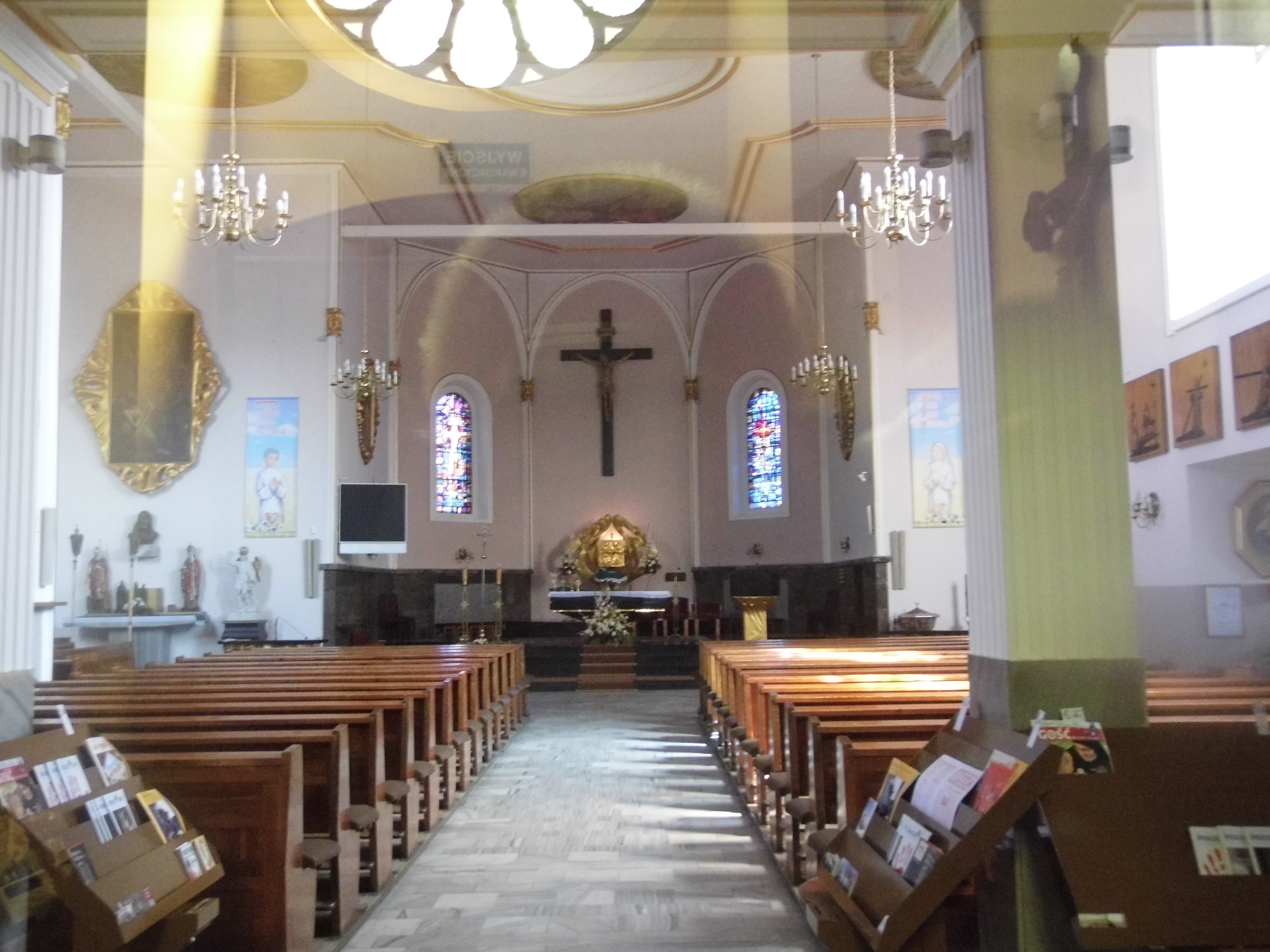
Interior of the church (2020)

As a result of a fire on 22 May 1770 the entire church burned down. In its place, Rev. Provincial Osiecki built a timber barracks out of his own pocket, which served as a religious building until about 1800.

As a result of moving the cemetery from the church square, a new church was built. The work was completed in 1804. The altar was dedicated to St. Stanislaus, and in 1884 three side altars appeared: the Blessed Virgin Mary, St. John of Nepomuk] and St. Anthony of Padua.

In 1895, the church burned down again. It was rebuilt by 1898 and consecrated in 1913.

Through battles during World War II, the tower was destroyed. It was rebuilt in 1947. Over time, the church was repaired (ceiling, fence, sheet metal on the roof) and new rooms were added.
