= Rudziczka, Silesian Voivodeship =

Rudziczka
- Village
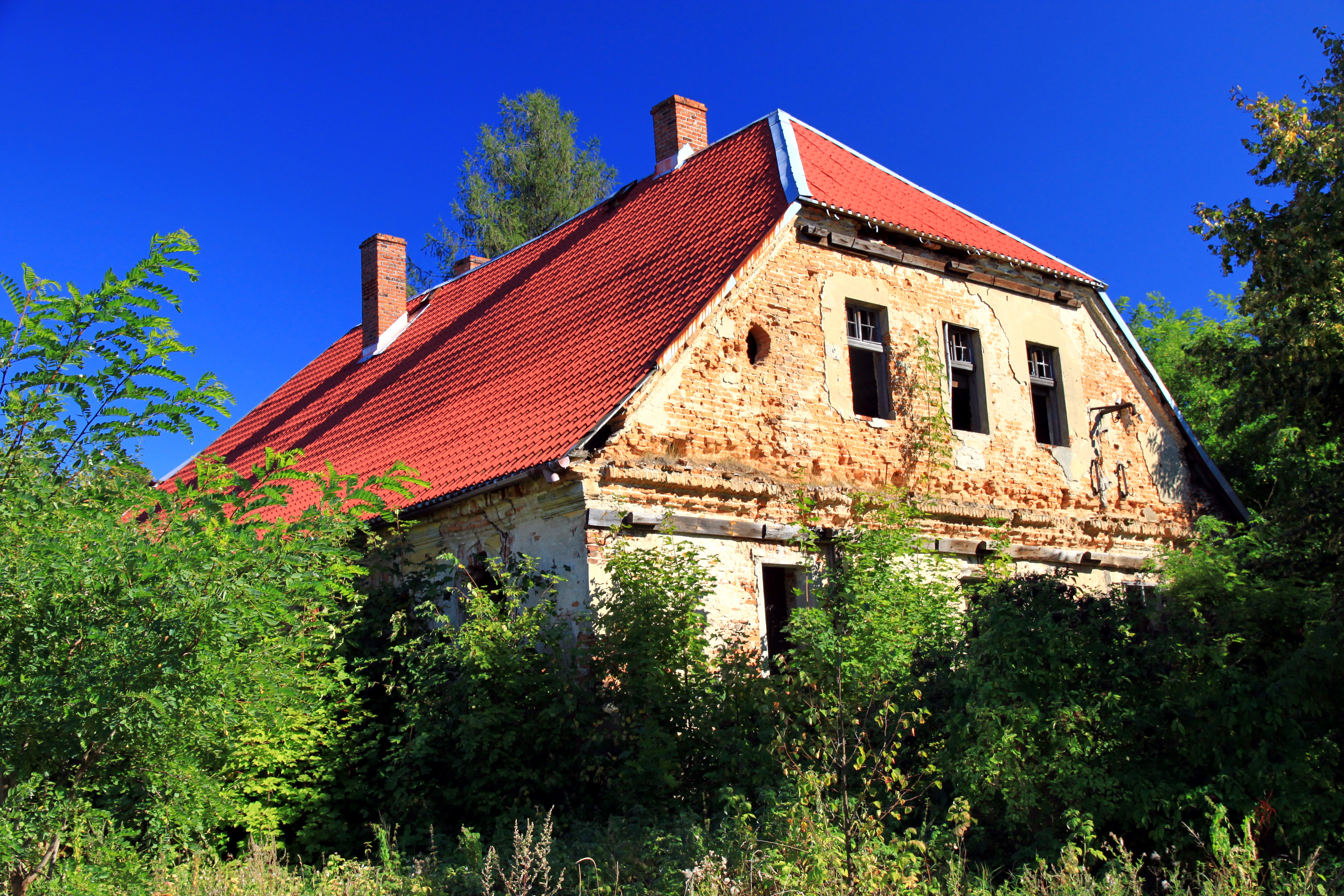
- Manor house

- Location within Poland
- Coordinates: 50°3′N 18°46′E
- Country: Poland
- Voivodeship: Silesian
- County: Pszczyna
- Gmina: Suszec
- Elevation: 269.4 m (884 ft)
- Population: 2,000

Rudziczka [ruˈd͡ʑit͡ʂka] is a village in the administrative district of Gmina Suszec, within Pszczyna County, Silesian Voivodeship, in southern Poland.
