= Hygrophyte =

Plant living in a humid or aquatic environment

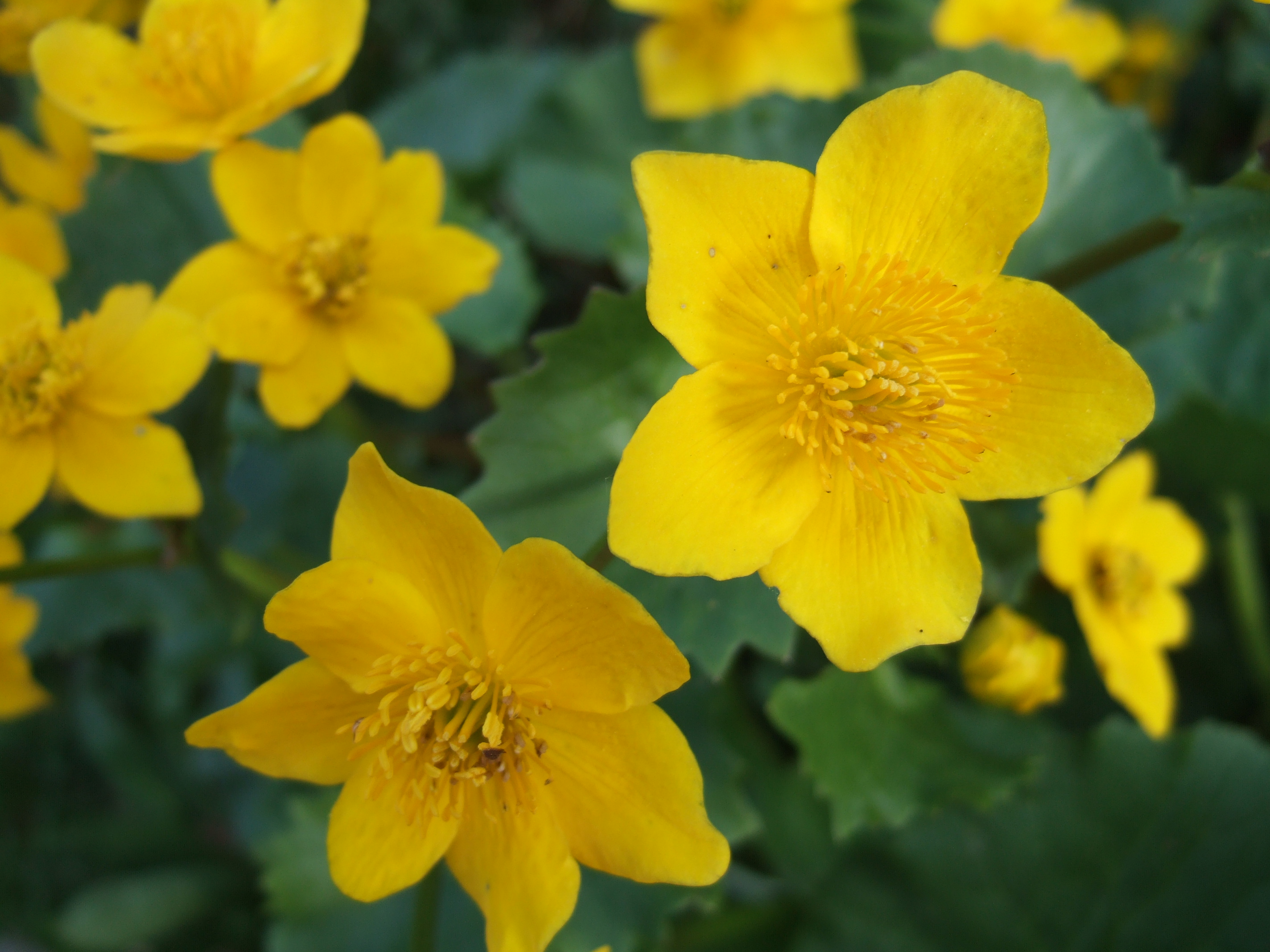
Caltha palustris is a hygrophyte

A hygrophyte (Greek hygros = wet + phyton = plant) is a plant that inhabits moist areas and is intolerant of dry conditions. The species may inhabit wet and dark forests and islands, dense swamps, and wet meadows. Within the group of all types of terrestrial plants, they are least resistant to drought.

Plants that are hydrophytes (aquatic plants) live within aquatic environments including lakes, streams, ponds, and oceans. While plants that are hygrophytes grow on wet soils, both types of plants are adapted to growing in soils that are low-oxygen (anaerobic) environments where there is extended periods of water saturation or flooding. The roots receive oxygen by alternative means than typical terrestrial plants which take up oxygen from the soil. They may absorb the oxygen they need by having hypertrophied lenticels such as the bark of speckled alder; the hollow stems of rush and grass species; and the air-filled cells (aerenchyma) in the roots of cattails, or modified roots.

Hygrohalophytes are plants that are simultaneously adapted to high soil moisture and high salt concentrations, and include the plants of saltmarshes and mangrove swamps.

== Examples of genera containing hygrophytes ==
- Adoxa
- Agrostis
- Bidens
- Caltha
- Cardamine
- Carex
- Catabrosa
- Chelidonium
- Circea
- Cyperus
- Drosera
- Equisetum
- Galium
- Glyceria
- Hymenophyllum
- Juncus
- Lythrum
- Oxalis

== See also ==
- Hydrophyte
- Mesophyte
- Xerophyte
