= Gmina Suszec =

Gmina Suszec Suszec Commune
- Gmina
- Coat of arms
- Interactive map of Gmina Suszec
- Coordinates (Suszec): 50°2′N 18°48′E
- Country: Poland
- Voivodeship: Silesian
- County: Pszczyna
- Seat: Suszec

Area
  - Total: 75.63 km^{2} (29.20 sq mi)

Population (2019-06-30)
  - Total: 12,331
  - Density: 163.0/km^{2} (422.3/sq mi)
- Website: http://www.suszec.pl

Gmina Suszec is a rural gmina (administrative district) in Pszczyna County, Silesian Voivodeship, in southern Poland. Its seat is the village of Suszec, which lies approximately 13 kilometres (8 mi) north-west of Pszczyna and 28 km (17 mi) south-west of the regional capital Katowice.

The gmina covers an area of 75.63 square kilometres (29.2 sq mi), and as of 2019 its total population is 12,331.

The gmina contains part of the protected area called Rudy Landscape Park.

== Villages ==
Gmina Suszec contains the villages and settlements of Kobielice, Kryry, Mizerów, Radostowice, Rudziczka, and Suszec.

== Neighbouring gminas ==
Gmina Suszec is bordered by the towns of Orzesze and Żory, and by the gminas of Kobiór, Pawłowice and Pszczyna.
