= Pszczyna =

Town in Silesian Voivodeship, Poland

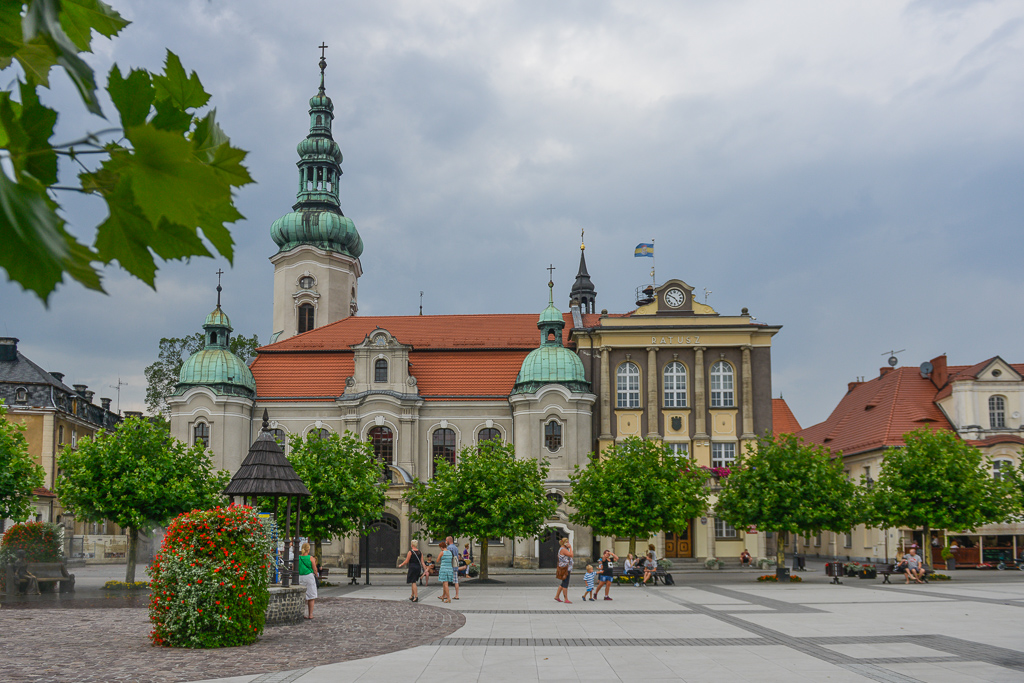
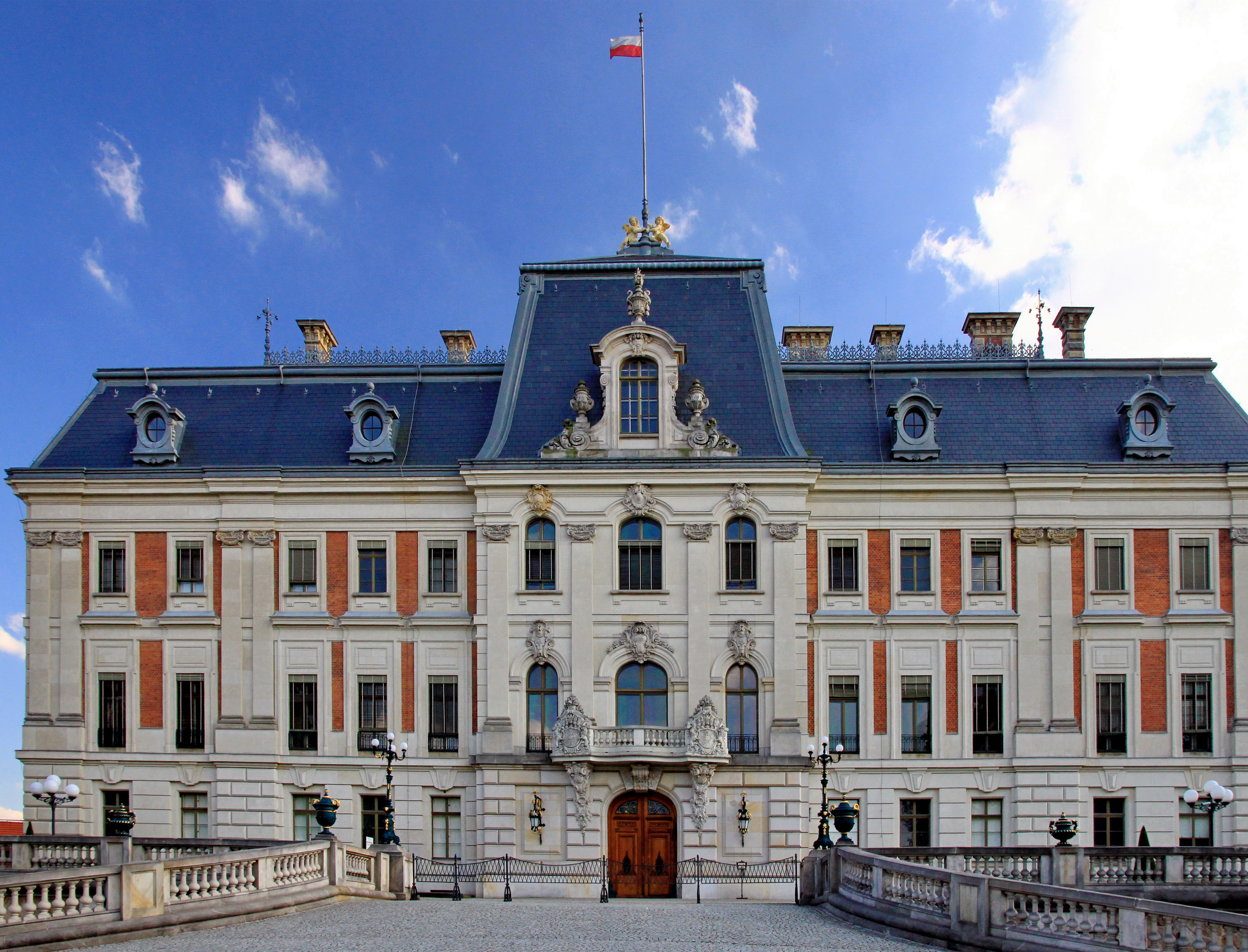
- Town Hall Pszczyna Castle Aerial view of the town center

- Flag Coat of arms

- Location within Poland
- Coordinates: 49°59′N 18°57′E
- Country: Poland
- Voivodeship: Silesian
- County: Pszczyna
- Gmina: Pszczyna

Government
  - Mayor: Dariusz Skrobol

Area
  - Total: 21.86 km^{2} (8.44 sq mi)
- Elevation: 262 m (860 ft)

Population (2019-06-30)
  - Total: 25,823
  - Density: 1,181/km^{2} (3,060/sq mi)
- Time zone: UTC+1 (CET)
  - Summer (DST): UTC+2 (CEST)
- Postal code: 43–200
- Car plates: SPS
- Climate: Dfb
- Website: http://www.pszczyna.pl

Pszczyna [ˈpʂt͡ʂɨna] (Note: German: Pleß, Czech: Pština) is a town in the Silesian Voivodeship in southern Poland, with a population of 25,823 (2019), and is the seat of a local gmina (commune) and county.

== Etymology ==
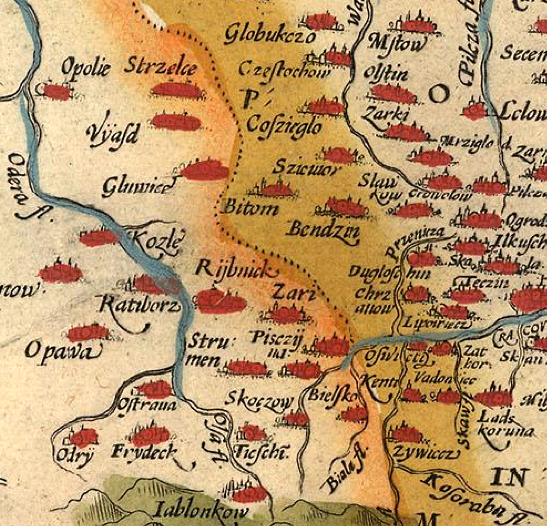
Fragment of a map from 1592 with Pisczijna marked

There are several different theories of the origins of the name Pszczyna. Ezechiel Zivier (1868–1925) hypothesized that the land was first owned by Pleszko (alternatively Leszko, or possibly Leszek, Duke of Racibórz). Polish scholar Aleksander Brückner in turn explained the name based on its old spelling Plszczyna, from the ancient Polish word pło or pleso meaning a lake, making Plszczyna a place by a lake. Brückner's derivation, suggesting a marshy lakeside, based on Proto-Slavic plszczyna, is generally accepted in literature. Yet another explanation has been put forward by Prof. Jan Miodek of the University of Wrocław, who derives the town's name from the name of a nearby river, now known as Pszczynka. Miodek claims, firstly, that the town owes its name to the river, not vice versa (as the -ka suffix in the present name of the river would indicate), and secondly, that the original name of the river, Blszczyna, derives from Proto-Slavic blskati, to glisten. The oldest recorded versions of the town's name (Plisschyn, Plisczyna, Plyssczyna, Blissczyna, Blyssczyna, Plesna, Pssczyna) exclude none of the above derivations, except perhaps the Leszko/Leszek one, which seems far fetched. Neither does the German name Pleß shed any light, as it simply reflects the Polish name at the time of the beginning of German settlement.

== History ==
=== Middle Ages and early Modern period ===
The oldest settlement evolved around a small gord and wooden church in what was later known as Stara Wieś. The modern town (around Market Square) was probably founded in the second half of the 13th century. The first reference in sources to the place dates from 1303. The main trading route between Kievan Rus and the Moravian Gate ran through Pszczyna in the early Middle Ages, and the small settlement probably provided protective measures for merchants on the ford (surrounded by marshlands) of the small Pszczynka river.

The land around Pszczyna was historically part of Lesser Poland. Casimir II the Just ceded the land to Mieszko Plątonogi, another Piast duke, of the Duchy of Opole and Racibórz, about 1177. Mieszko Plątonogi was succeeded by other dukes from the Opole-Racibórz line: Casimir I of Opole, Mieszko II the Fat, his brother Władysław Opolski, his two sons - Casimir of Bytom and Bolko I of Opole, and finally Leszek of Racibórz, who was the last to preserve the Duchy's independence. In 1327, he was forced to acknowledge sovereignty of John, King of Bohemia. After Leszek died childless in 1336, his lands passed down to his brother-in-law, Nicholas II, Duke of Opava, of the Czech Premyslid royal dynasty.

Nicholas II, his son John I, Duke of Opava-Ratibor, and his grandson John II, Duke of Opava-Ratibor (Jan II Żelazny) ruled the land for seven decades. In 1407, John II separated the area that is modern-day Pszczyna from his duchy as a wittum for his new wife, Helena of Lithuania (Helena Korybutówna, niece of Władysław II Jagiełło, the king of Poland). The boundaries outlined by John II survived well into the 20th century. The contemporary land (powiat) of Pszczyna is only about half the size it was during the Middle Ages.

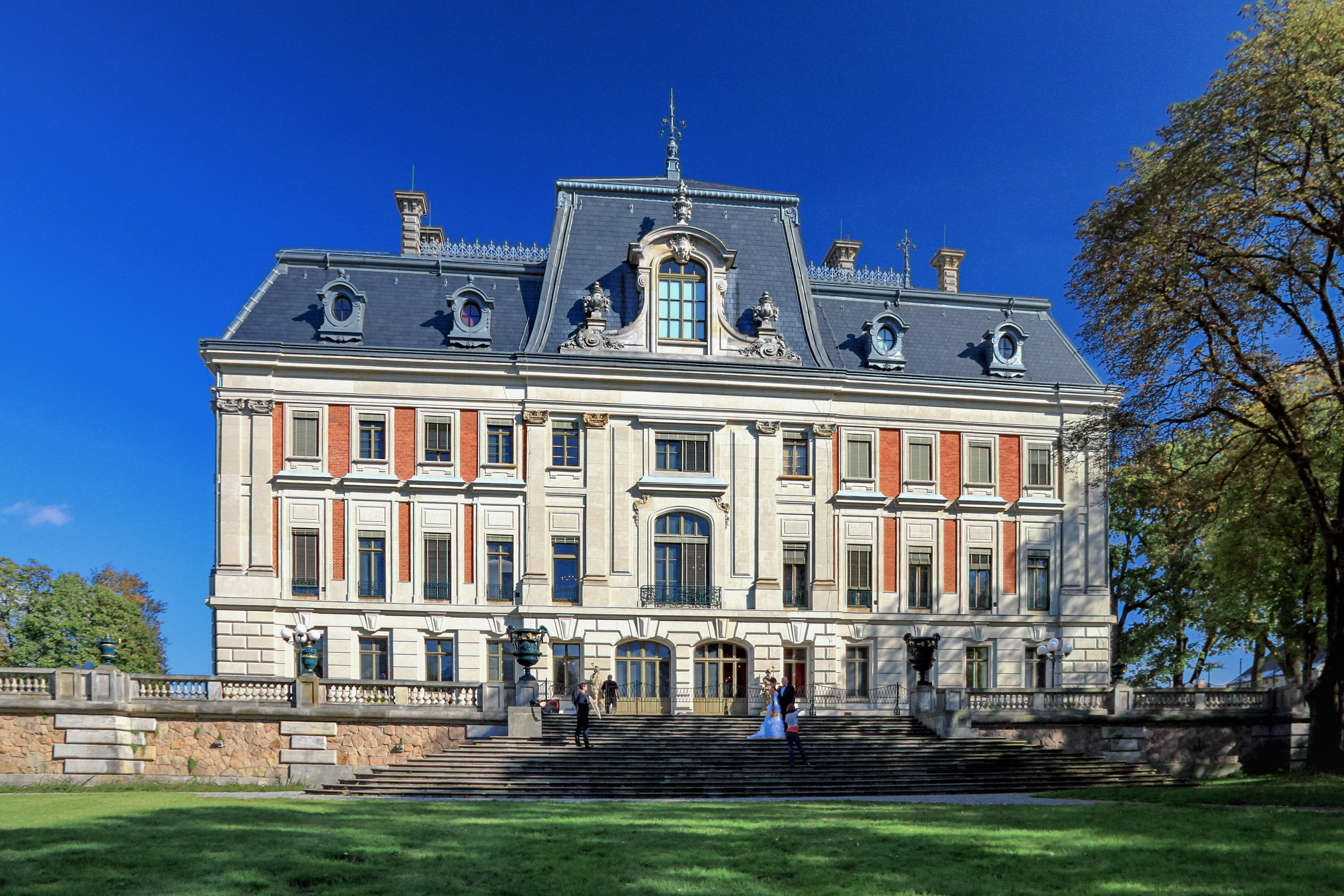
Pszczyna Castle, originally from the 13th century, rebuilt in Polish Renaissance style in the 17th century

In 1433, Pszczyna was attacked by the Hussites, who laid siege to the castle but were eventually repulsed. Helena of Lithuania outlived John II, and reigned until 1449. The land was inherited by her son, Nicholas V, Duke of Krnov and then his widow, Barbara Rockenberg, daughter of a wealthy Kraków merchant. She was expelled by her stepson, John IV, who assumed power in the years 1462–1465. His rights were in turn disputed by his brother, Wenceslaus III, Duke of Rybnik. Aggressive policies caused a conflict between Wenceslaus III and the King of Hungary and Bohemia, Matthias Corvinus. Matthias overran the land and held the duke in captivity until his death. Casimir II, Duke of Cieszyn, the last of the local Piast dynasty bloodline, received the land in 1480 as a dowry of his wife, Joanna. Casimir II sold it to a Hungarian noble Elek Thurzó (Aleksy Thurzo) in 1517. Two years later, Louis II, King of Hungary, Bohemia and Croatia instituted the "Free State of Pszczyna", with its ruler responsible not to him but directly to the Holy Roman Emperor. The new state was expanded to include fifty villages and four towns (including Bieruń, Mysłowice, and Mikołów), and was sworn allegiance by another 27 vassal villages.

The Thurzo family were in close relations with Polish King Sigismund I the Old. Queen Bona Sforza stayed for a night on her way to her wedding to Sigismund in Kraków in (1518). Thurzo possessions were diminished over time (stripped of Mysłowice in 1536) and eventually the land of Pszczyna was purchased by Balthasar von Promnitz, bishop of Wrocław, under a special provision that the land should be further divided.

=== Late Modern period ===
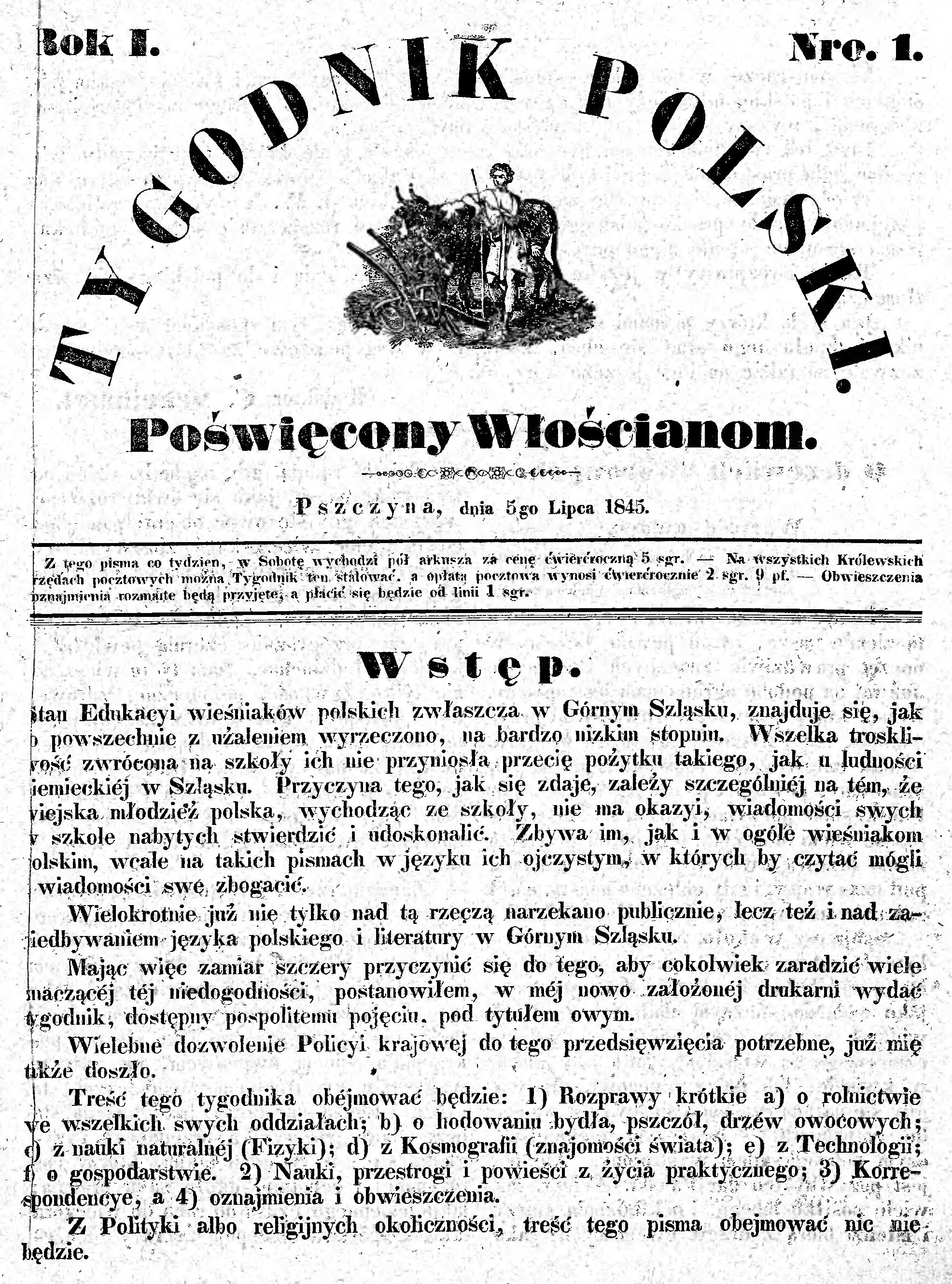
First issue of Tygodnik Polski Poświęcony Włościanom, 1845

Pleß was ravaged and pillaged during the Thirty Years' War. During the War of the Austrian Succession, the Kingdom of Prussia clashed with Austria for Silesia and Frederick The Great, the king of Prussia, seized most of Silesia in the First Silesian War of 1741–1742. The town was pillaged again during the Seven Years' War. Shortly afterwards, the last Promnitz gave the land to his nephew, Frederic Erdmann.

Erdmann's line, the Anhalts, held Pleß until the middle of the 19th century, when it passed to Hans Heinrich X of the powerful Hochberg family who held extensive lands around present-day Wałbrzych. The Hochbergs reached great prominence and wealth in the 19th century.

From 1816 to 1922, the town was the seat of Kreis Pleß. The oldest Polish newspaper in Upper Silesia, Tygodnik Polski Poświęcony Włościanom, began publishing in the town in 1845.

During the Polish January Uprising in 1863 Poles smuggled large amounts of gunpowder through the town to the Russian Partition of Poland. From 1871 Pleß was part of Germany, however, at the beginning of the 20th century, over 80 percent of the district's population spoke Polish; during the 1910 census 86 percent declared as Polish speakers, though in the town itself the percentage of Polish speakers was 33. When World War I erupted, the Hochbergs lent the estate to the German state for military purposes. The German chief of staff held his headquarters at the castle of Pleß, often visited by Emperor Wilhelm II himself.

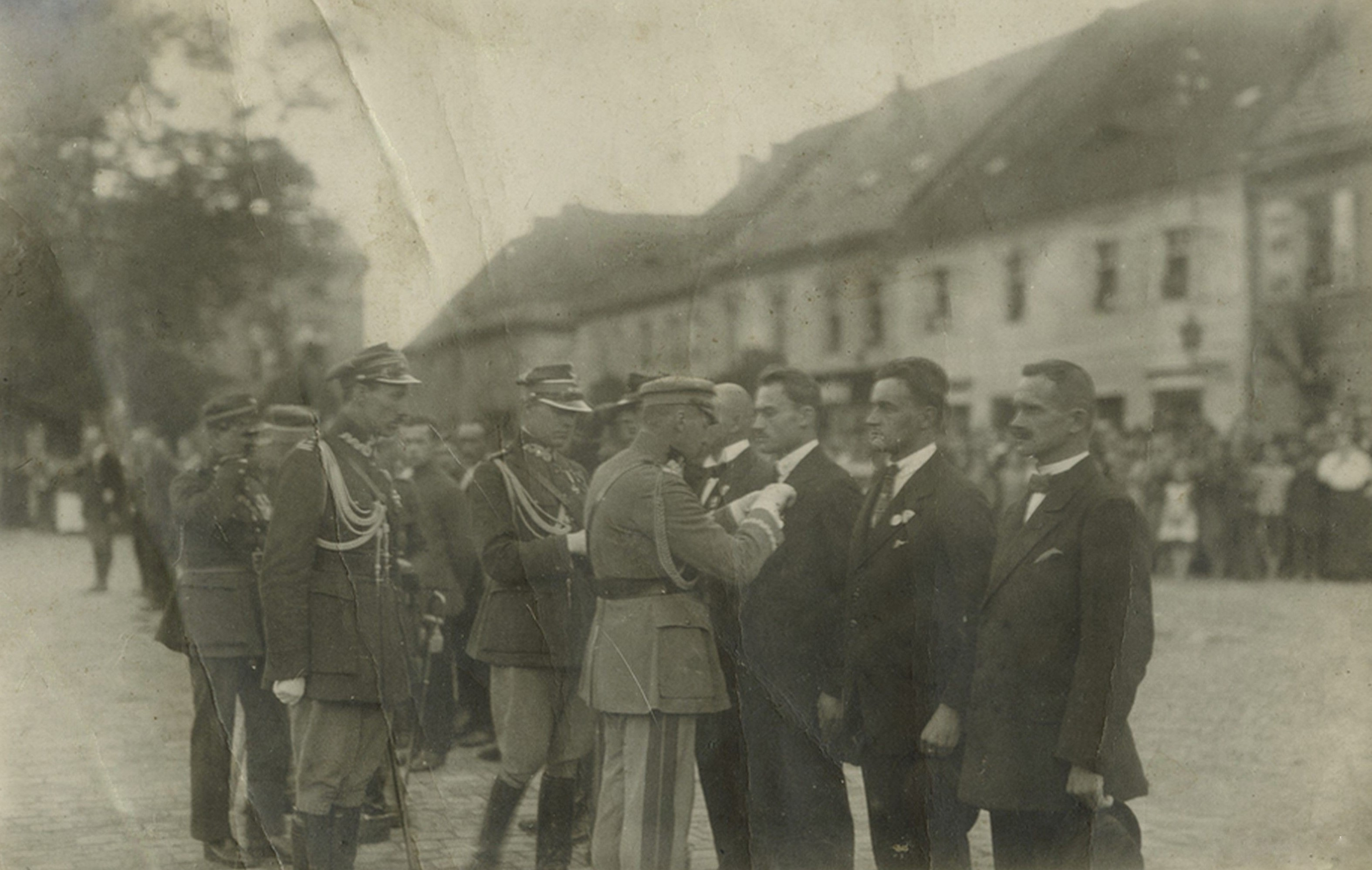
Visit of interwar Polish leader Józef Piłsudski in Pszczyna in 1922

After the war ended, the newly established Second Polish Republic and the German Weimar Republic struggled for control of the region. Prince Hans Heinrich XV favored the creation of an independent Silesian Republic or at least an independent Upper Silesia. The latter was supported by the Union of Upper Silesians (1919–1924), which he financed. With the outbreak of the Silesian Uprising, the Hochbergs sided firmly with the German cause and made the estate available to German paramilitary organizations, including for a prison for the Polish insurgents. Hans Heinrich XV supplied units at his own expense, commanded by his son, Hans Heinrich XVII; they took part in the bitter struggles for Góra Świętej Anny in 1921. Earlier that year a plebiscite was held to determine the future of the region. In Kreis Pleß 53 thousands voted for Poland and 18 thousands for Germany. By contrast, voting in the town alone gave victory to Germany, with 2843 over 910. In view of the plebiscite results and in consequence of the Third Silesian Uprising the Versailles Treaty gave the land of Pszczyna to the Second Polish Republic. On May 29, 1922, the Polish army officially entered the city and the Polish administration took over, with Jan Figna becoming the first Polish mayor.

=== World War II ===
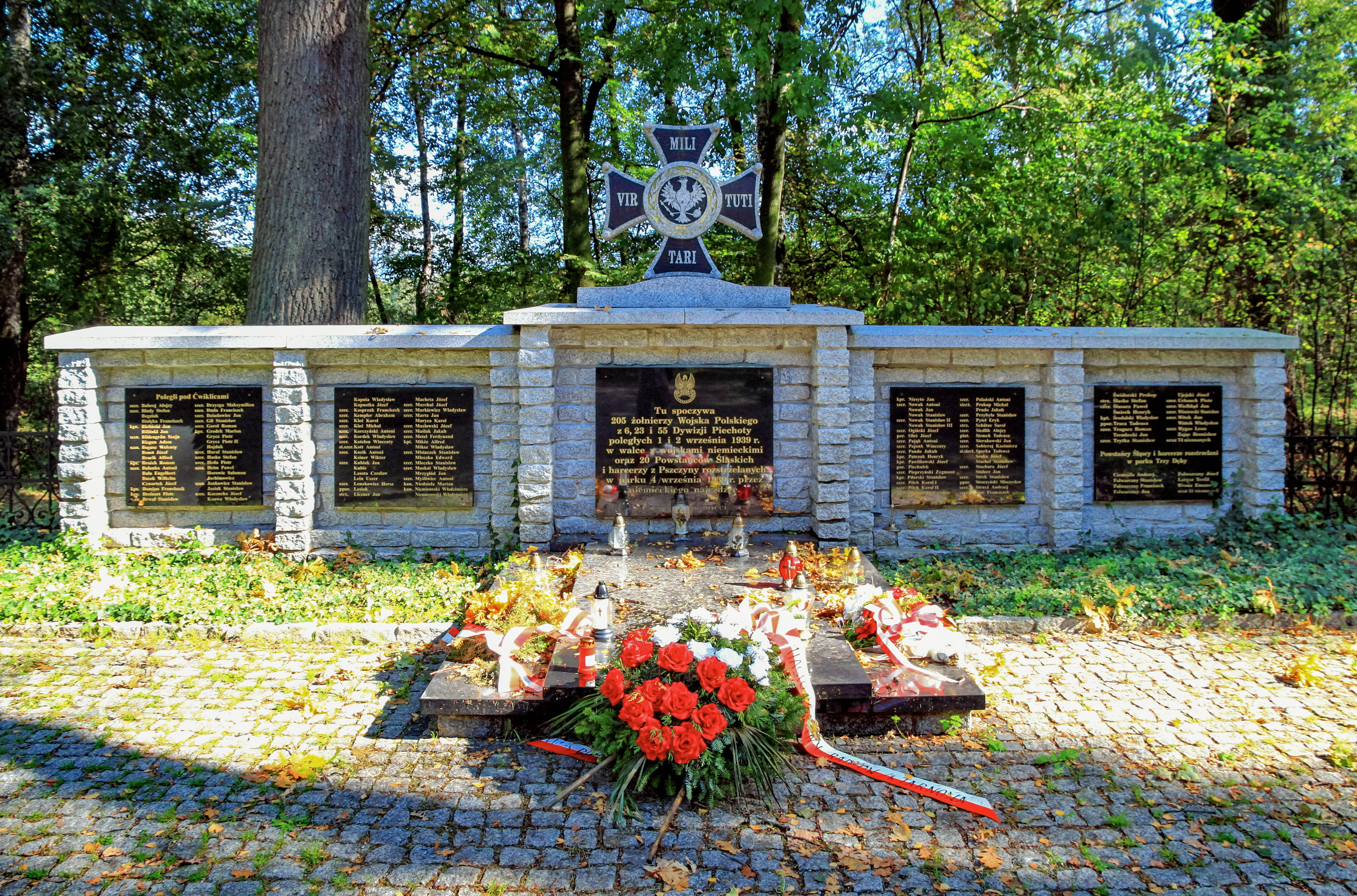
Mass grave of Polish soldiers fallen in the Battle of Pszczyna and Polish boy scouts and civilian defenders murdered by the Germans in September 1939

During the German invasion of Poland, which started World War II, fighting occurred in the surroundings of Pszczyna, which can be seen by observing the leftovers of concrete strongholds around the town. In that area, the Battle of Pszczyna took place on September 1–2, 1939, where German forces breached main Polish defensive lines protecting the Silesian area. On September 4, in the local park, the German Freikorps murdered 14 Poles who had taken part in the defense of nearby Katowice (13 boy scouts and one school teacher). They were buried in the nearby forest in an unmarked mass grave. Poles arrested during the Intelligenzaktion, aimed at the extermination of the Polish intelligentsia, were imprisoned in a local court prison, and then deported to concentration camps.

At least twelve Poles from Pszczyna, including a local elementary school principal, the local police chief, and several policemen, were murdered by the Russians in the Katyn massacre in 1940.

From November 1942 to April 1943, the German administration operated a forced labour subcamp of the Auschwitz concentration camp in the present-day district of Stara Wieś. On 23 January 1944, the Gestapo carried out arrests of 130 Polish partisans of the Pszczyna district of the Home Army.

In the final stages of the war, in January 1945, the Nazi Germans murdered many prisoners of the Auschwitz concentration camp, who tried to escape during a death march. Between the end of January and beginning of February 1945, the war storm came through Pszczyna with no serious damage to the city. Unfortunately, the wooden historic church of Saint Jadwiga burned down in 1939. The city was liberated on February 10, 1945.

=== After 1945 ===
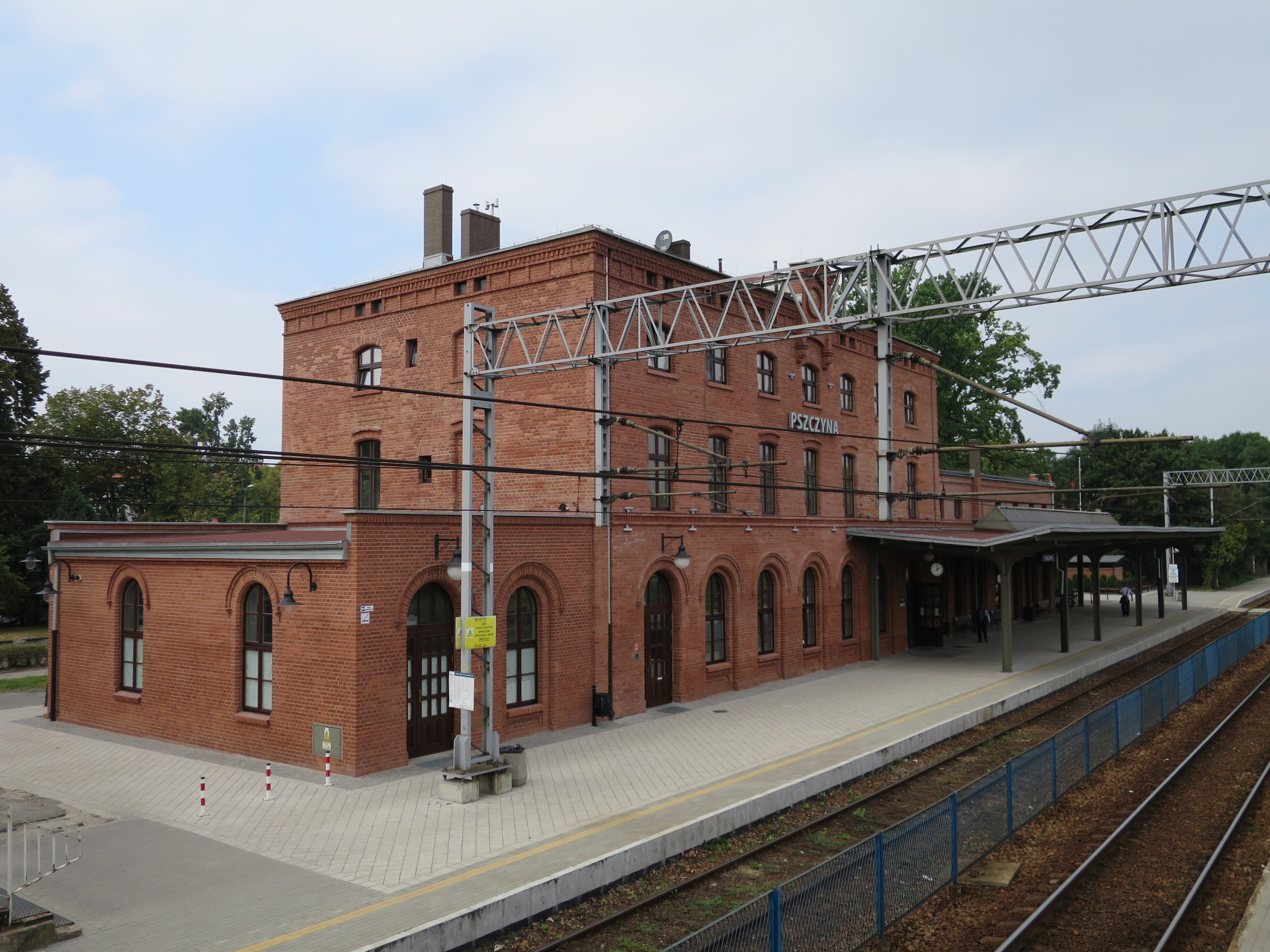
Historical train station after renovation

Unlike the rest of Upper Silesia, Pszczyna never experienced rapid industrialization. The ELWO factory was expanded and a new creamery and mill were founded. This, however, helped to preserve the historic old town and the palace located in the city center. It was administratively part of the Katowice Voivodeship from 1975 until the 1998 administrative reforms.

== Population ==
In 2010 Pszczyna had a population of 25,415.

Year	1787	1825	1905	1931	1961	1970	2004
Inhabitants	2 267	2 063	5 190	7 200	15 340	17 994	26 677

=== Jews in Pszczyna ===
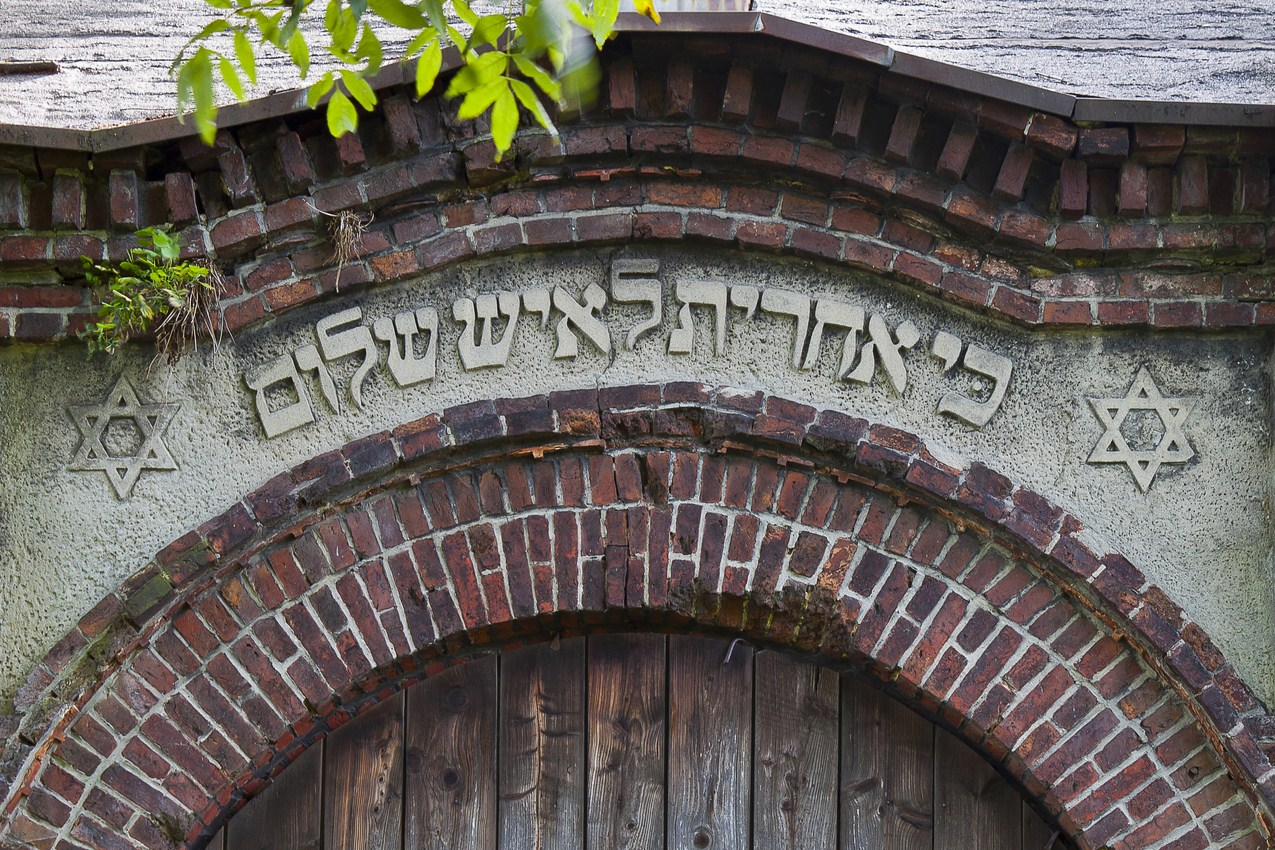
Inscription from the Jewish Cemetery

The Jewish community was small before the edict of 1780 granting Jews the right to settle in Silesian towns to the east of river Oder. By 1787, the Jewish population had grown to 85 people. Regulations passed by Frederick William III in 1812 proclaimed Jews to be full citizens of the state. As their numbers grew, Jews called for a synagogue to perform their religious duties. A wooden synagogue was built in 1834 and, eventually, a bricked structure in 1852. The synagogue has survived into the 21st century but nothing of historical value remains of the interior: during World War II it was used as a cinema.

The community's educational needs were also met with the establishment of a cheder (Jewish school) in 1812. From 1820, Jews were allowed to attend Protestant and Catholic schools. A new, joint Protestant and Jewish school was established in 1873 and became a municipal school in 1893.

The Jewish community reached its highest peak in 1885, numbering 341 members. Markus Brann, Jewish theologian and historian and future lecturer at the Jewish Theological Seminary of Breslau, was active in Pszczyna during that period. The number of Jews had dropped significantly when Poland took control of the city in 1922, as most of the Jews identifying themselves as Germans had left for Germany.

Only scarce evidence of the town's former Jewish presence has been left – the cemetery, the former residence of the Jewish community and the synagogue. The cemetery in Pszczyna, on Katowicka Street, was founded in 1814. The last reported burial took place in 1937. During World War II the cemetery was not destroyed. The oldest tombstone was discovered in June 2009. It belongs to Gitel Gutmann, who died on September 10, 1814. The cemetery is in the permanent custody of Sławomir Pastuszka, who provides information both on the cemetery and on the local Jewish community. On May 8, 2012, it was reported that the Jewish cemetery had been vandalized. Nineteen tombstones, some of which date back to the early 19th century, were damaged in the old part of the cemetery. The local community contributed to the restoration of 150 graves of historical value.

=== Protestants in Pszczyna ===
Lutheranism was introduced to Pszczyna in 1568 by Duke Karol Promnitz. In a course of next 20 years, Lutheranism spread among the local population. A Protestant minister came to the county in 1569, followed by opening of the first Protestant school. During the counter-reformation in 1649 celebrations of Protestant religious service were confined to the Castle of Pszczyna.

From 1709 on Erdmann Promnitz received permission for building a Protestant church. Along with church, a Protestant school had been reintroduced. The church burned down in 1905 and was rebuilt two years later. It is still in operation and serves as the central point for the Protestant community, which numbers 1500 members.

== Geography ==
=== Topography ===
Pszczyna is situated on sandy plains ascending into the east. The land is slightly hilly, but with no large relative elevations. The highest points are less than 260 metres (850 feet) above sea level.

=== Climate ===
As Pszczyna is in a moderate climatic zone, the climate is directly influenced by a clash of oceanic and continental air masses. While the former usually takes the upper hand, the temperature does not vary widely. Severe or long winters are rare. The warm tropical air coming through the Moravian Gate (a depression between the Sudetes and the Carpathian Mountains) contributes to this.

The average annual temperature is 7–8 °C (45–46 °F). The hottest month is July (15 °C (59 °F) average) and the coldest is January (−1 °C (30 °F) average).

R. Gumiński researched the climate in the land around Pszczyna. He defined three distinguished sub-climatic provinces – the western "podsudecka", the eastern "tarnowska", and the northern "kielecko-czestochowska". The eastern part offers the most favorable environment for plants and vegetation, with over 220 days of growing season and 770 mm (30 in) of precipitation. Pszczyna gets the least rainfall in winter months and the highest level in July. Snowfall begins in the middle of November, lingers for 50–70 days, and generally does not exceed a depth of 15 cm (5.9 in).

Slight westerly winds are dominant, averaging 2–3 km/h (1.2–1.9 mph). The period of windless weather appears regularly, caused by the cover of, and the dry down-slope foehn winds arriving from, the Beskid Śląski mountain range.

Goczałkowice Reservoir, by far the largest reservoir in southern Poland, gives the climate in Pszczyna an even more distinctive imprint by moderating winters and summers.

=== Land use ===
The total area of 174 square kilometres (67 sq mi) includes 95 km^{2} (37 sq mi) of farmland (68 km^{2} (26 sq mi) of arable land, 1.5 km^{2} (0.58 sq mi) of orchards, 16 km^{2} (6.2 sq mi) of meadows, 9 km^{2} (3.5 sq mi) of pasture) and 51 km^{2} (20 sq mi) of forest grounds (50 km^{2} (19 sq mi) of forests, 1.6 km^{2} (0.62 sq mi) of tree-planted and shrub-planted land).

== Sights ==
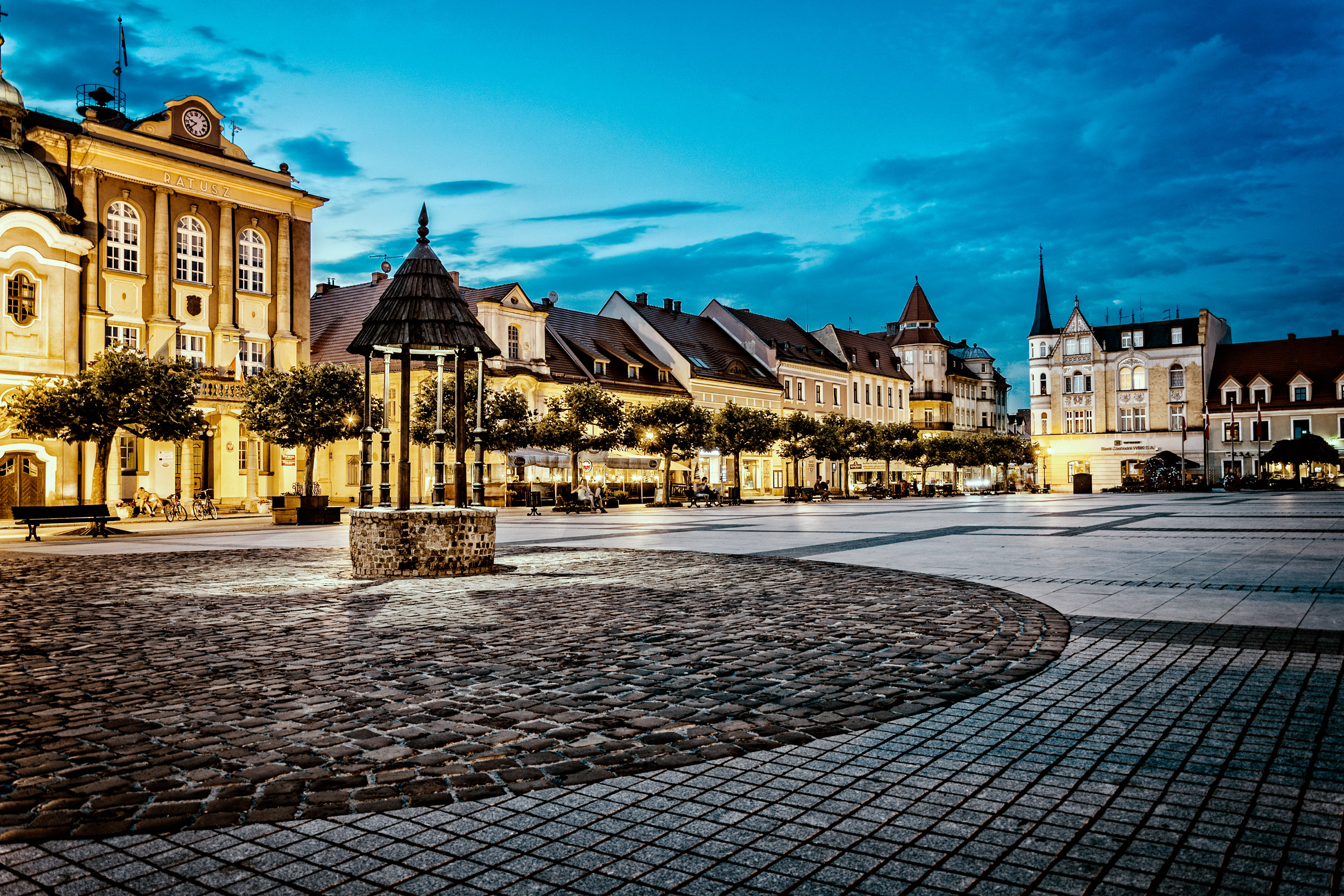
Market Square – Rynek

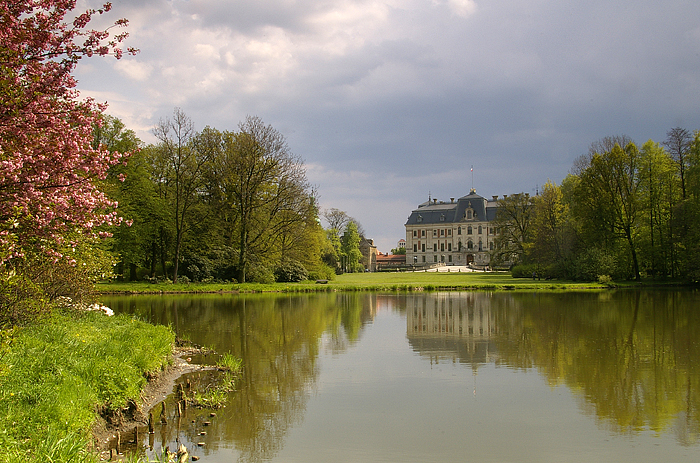
Park Zamkowy (Castle Park)

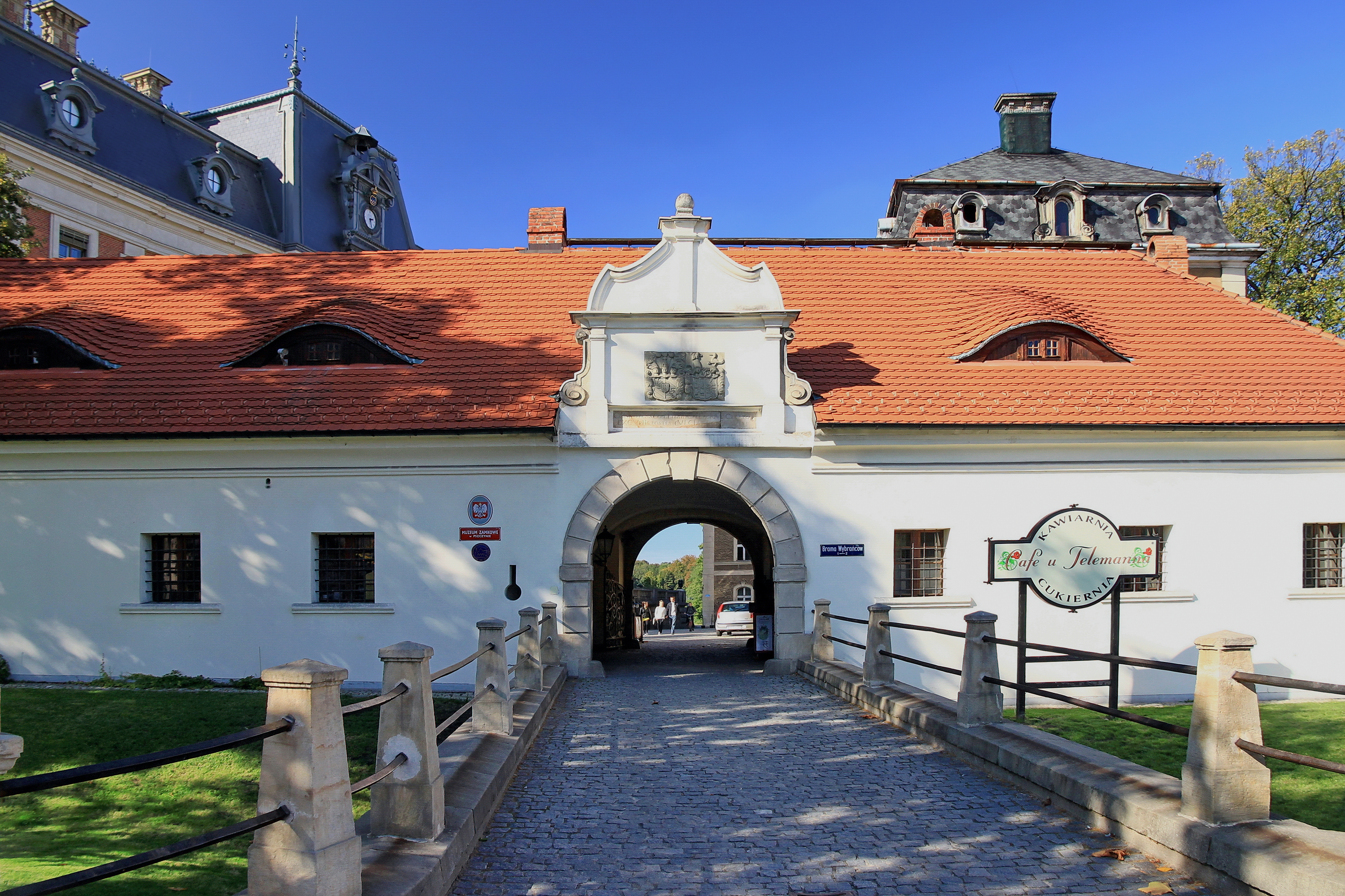
Brama Wybrańców (Gate of the Chosen Ones)

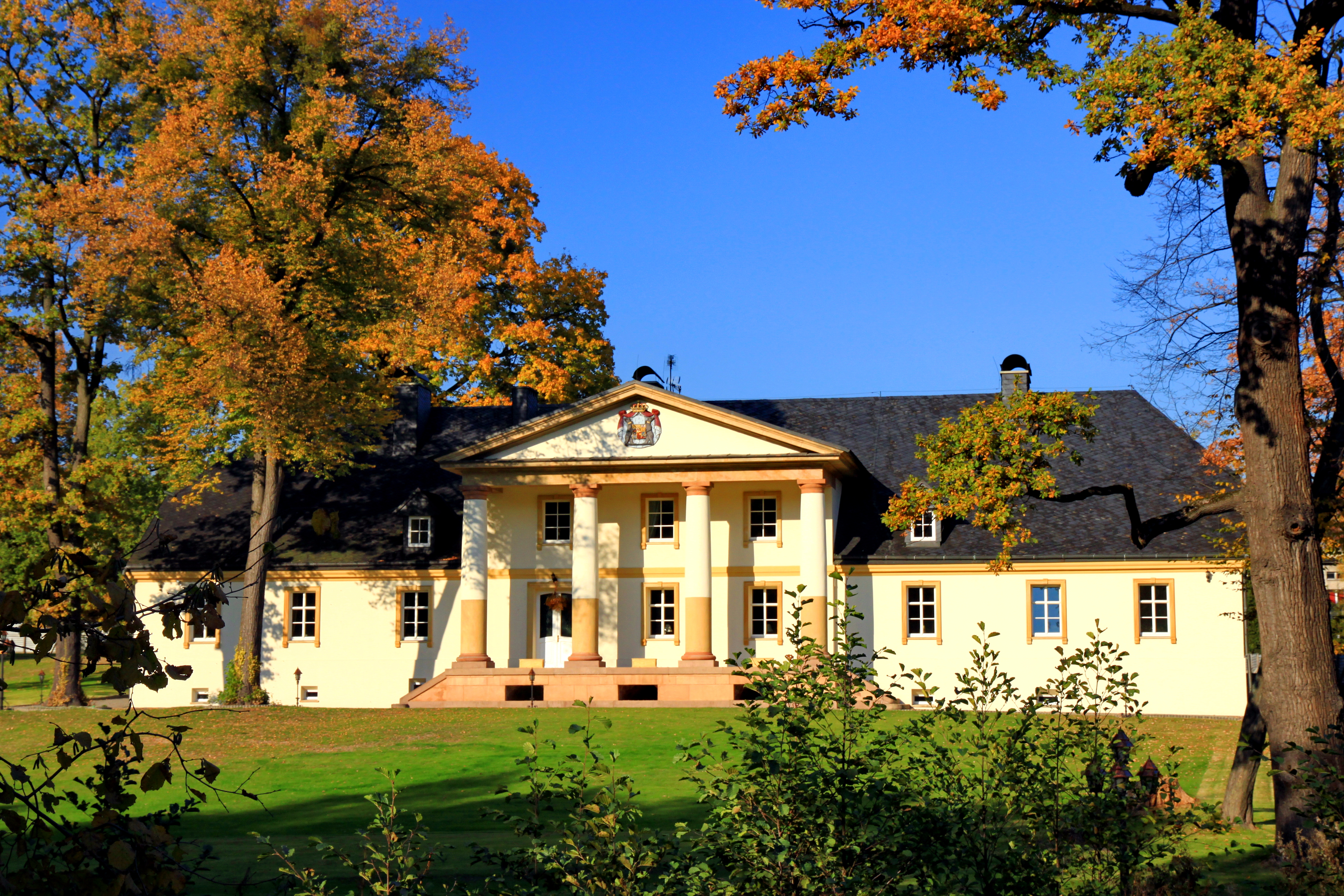
Ludwikówka manor house

Main sights of Pszczyna include the Pszczyna Castle and Park ensemble, a registered Historic Monument of Poland, the Rynek (Market Square) filled with historic tenements and containing the Town Hall and Protestant Church, and the Catholic All Saints Church. Pszczyna has three museums: the Castle Museum, the Museum of Military History of Silesia, and the Silesian Press Museum.

== Sports ==
The local football club is MKS Iskra Pszczyna. It competes in the lower leagues.

== Notable people ==
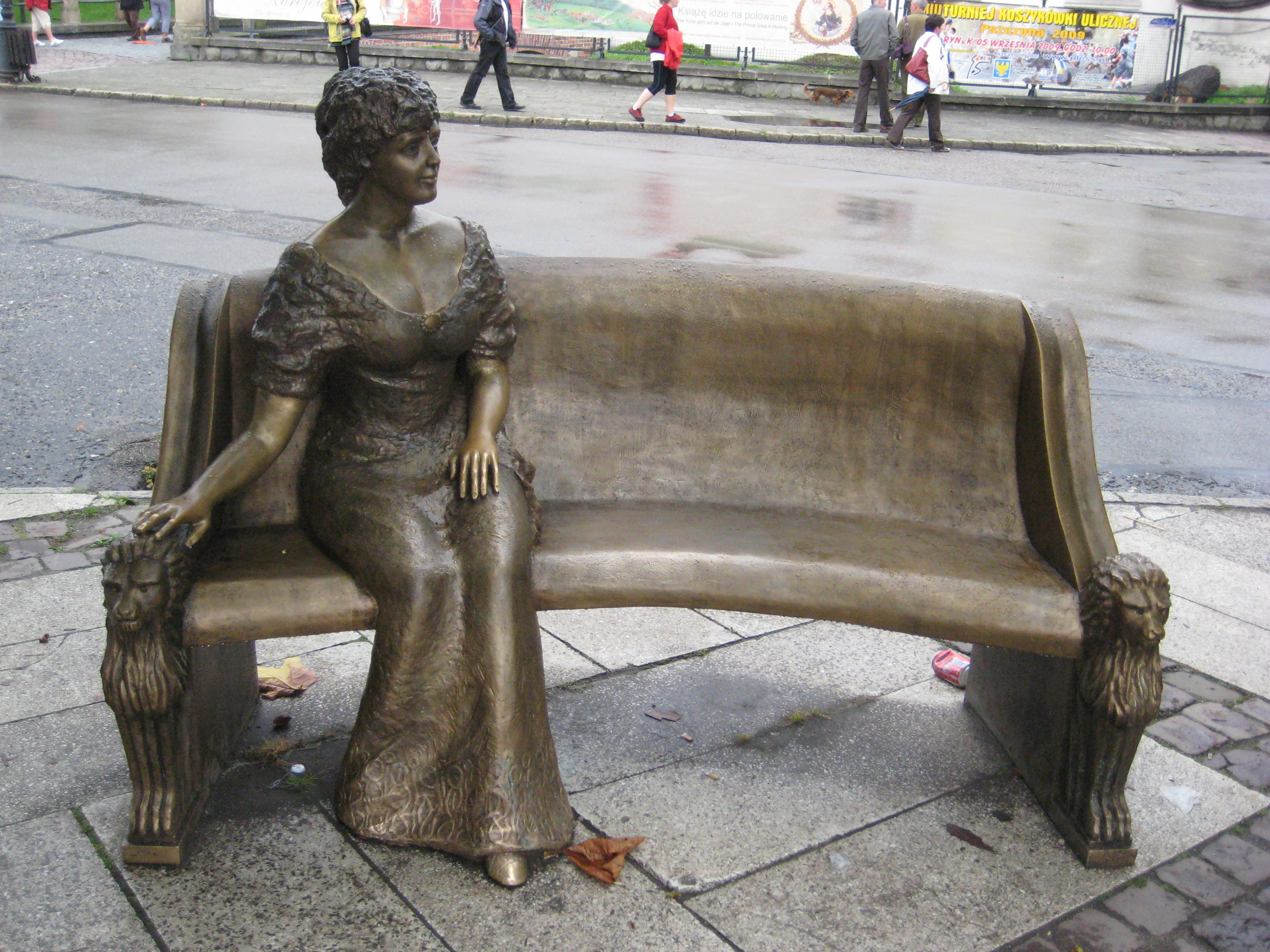
Memorial to Daisy in Pszczyna

- Georg Philipp Telemann (1681–1767) composer, once a kapellmeister in the city
- Frederick Ferdinand, Duke of Anhalt-Köthen (1769–1830), Prussian general
- Louis, Prince of Anhalt-Pless (1783–1841)
- August Kiß (1802–1865), sculptor
- Wilhelm Engerth (1814–1884), architect
- Max Friedländer (1829–1872), Jewish journalist who founded the Viennese newspaper the Neue Freie Presse
- Hans Heinrich XV (1861–1938), Prince of Pless and local businessman
- Karl Hoefer (1862–1939), Prussian general
- Daisy, Princess of Pless (1873–1943)
- Otto Lasch (1893–1971), Wehrmacht general
- Max Liebling (1845–1927), concert pianist, composer, and conductor
- Bruno Chrobek (1895–1942) Wehrmacht general
- Johnny Friedlaender (1912–1992), Jewish artist
- Tomasz Tomczykiewicz (1961–2015), politician
- Przemysław Pitry (born 1981), footballer and manager
- Alicja Janosz (born 1985), singer, winner of the 2002 Polish Idol contest
- Joanna Worek (born 1986), Polish-Czech chess player

== Twin towns and sister cities ==
See twin towns of Gmina Pszczyna.
