= Těchlovice =

Těchlovice may refer to places in the Czech Republic:

- Těchlovice (Děčín District), a municipality and village in the Ústí nad Labem Region
- Těchlovice (Hradec Králové District), a municipality and village in the Hradec Králové Region
- Těchlovice, a village and part of Stříbro in the Plzeň Region
