= Church of St. Martin in the Wall =

Coordinates: 50.0831°N 14.4200°E

- Kostel svatého Martina ve zdi
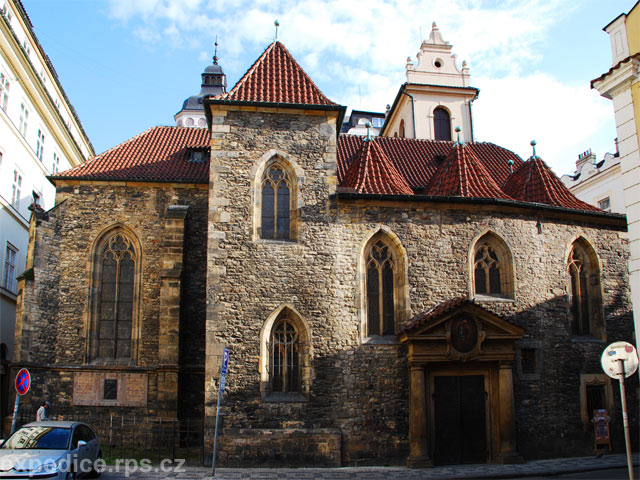
- Church of St. Martin in the Wall
- Location: Prague
- Country: Czech Republic
- Denomination: Lutheran
- Previous denomination: Catholic Church
- Website: martinvezdi.e-cirkev.cz

History
- Status: Parish church
- Dedication: Martin of Tours

Architecture
- Functional status: active
- Heritage designation: National Cultural Monument of the Czech Republic
- Style: Gothic
- Groundbreaking: 1178
- Completed: 1488

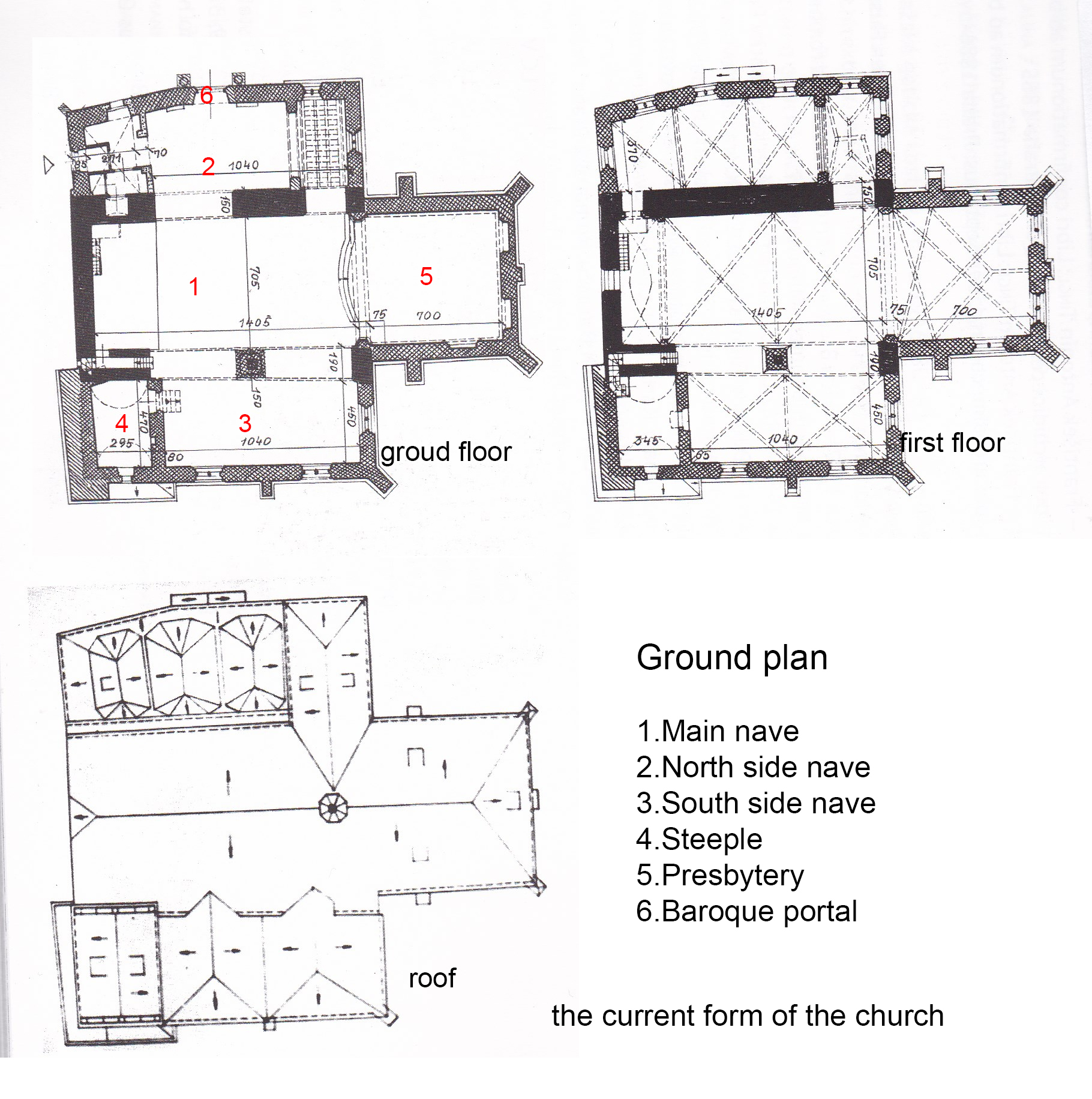
Groundplan of church St.Martin in the wall

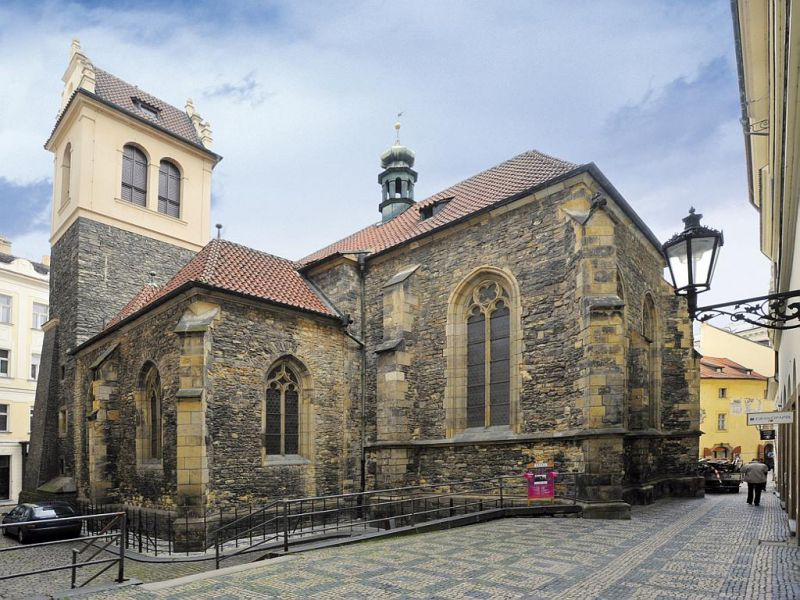
St.Martin in the wall

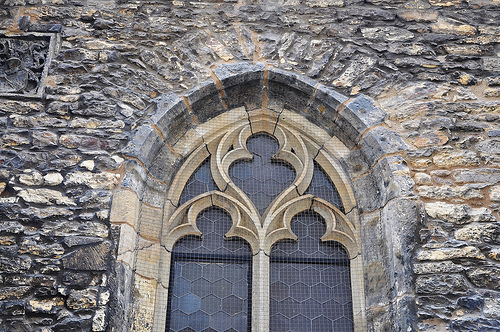
St.Martin in the wall

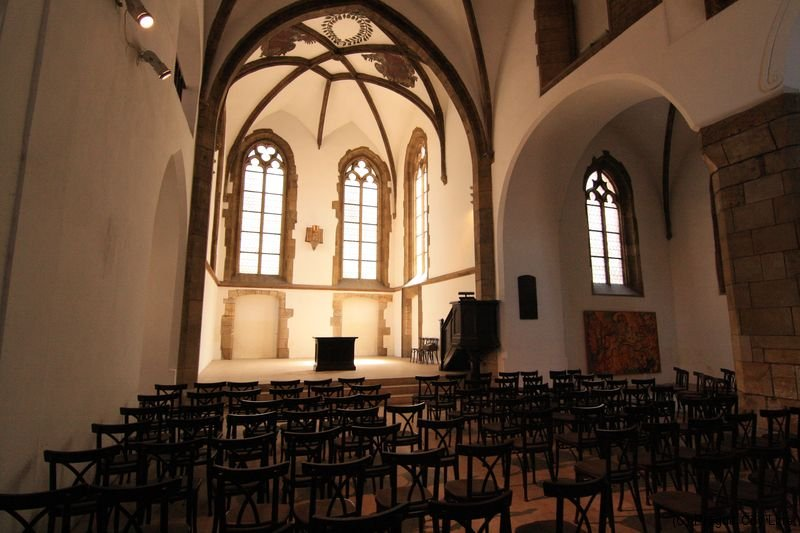
St.Martin in the wall

The Church of St. Martin in the Wall (Czech: Kostel svatého Martina ve zdi) is a Gothic church with Romanesque grounds, situated in the Old Town of Prague, Czech Republic. It was built between 1178 and 1187 in the village of Újezd, thereafter known as Újezd u svatého Martina. The south wall of the church was built adjacent to the walls of the Old Town, hence the full name of the church "in the wall". The church belongs to the Evangelical Church of Czech Brethren.

== Construction ==
=== Romanesque structure ===
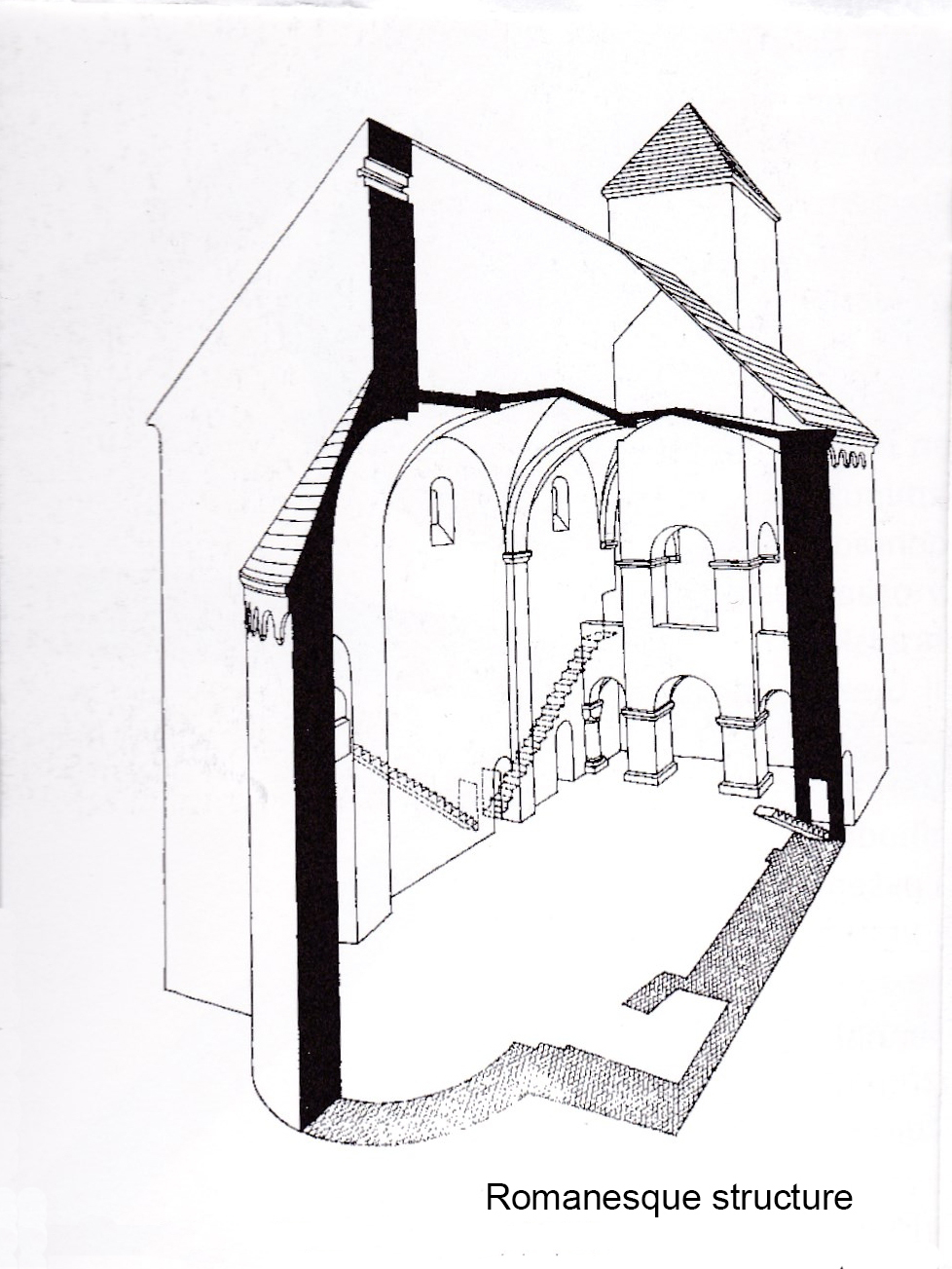
St. Martin in the wall

The settlement where the church was built was called Újezd before 1178 and Újezd u svatého Martina after 1187, so it is thought that the church was built between those years, when the settlement was the property of a duke. The settlement was a gift to the Vyšehrad Chapter by Soběslav II, Duke of Bohemia. During the construction of the Old Town walls in the 1230s, Újezd was divided into two; the larger part remained in the later New Town and the smaller part with the church became a part of the Old Town. The south side was connected to the wall, and for this reason the church became known as "in the wall". There was also a town gate in the neighbourhood called St. Martin's Gate.

St. Martin's Church became the subject of scientific research after the discovery of its Romanesque base during the renovation carried out by Kamil Hilbert in the early 20th century. In 1905 a comprehensive study by J. Teige was published. Considerable attempts were made to reconstruct its original form. Scientists Vojtěch Birnbaum and Jiří Čarek suggested two towers in the eastern side, while Mencl instead proposed a pair of inner galleries in the southeast and northeast corner with access through two staircases in the thickness of the wall and a single steeple in the western part of the nave, and this latter theory was widely accepted.

Dobroslav Líbal rejected the notion of the west steeple; he pointed out that the pillars of the inner gallery were too weak. Zdeněk Dragoun uncovered the brickwork of the south east side area. The ground plan of the eastern part of the church was very irregular. This form of early medieval church differed significantly from the production of that period.

The original foundation of the church with one nave was virtually identical to today's main nave with today's shape and a number of Romanesque architectural elements. The interior of the Romanesque church was probably decorated with murals. The church was vaulted with two fields of cross vaults.

=== Gothic reconstruction ===
Gothic modifications were made during the reign of Charles IV after 1350. The shrine was constructed in 1358 and the floor level was heightened. The nave was extended with a new presbytery, which has a pair of windows in the front wall. It was vaulted with a special kind of net vault, called a jump vault. Its ribs end on brackets and the whole space was roofed with hip roof. The south wall was breached with new pointed windows (however, their present shape is the result of Hilbert's renovation).

The nave was heightened and newly vaulted. A prismatic wall was built in the southwest corner. The vault with irregular shape and a steeple on the side of the church were completed before 1358. The presbytery was vaulted with the rib vault in the 1360s, which is considered one of the oldest of that kind of vaulting in the country. Its ribs grow from pyramidal consoles with mascarons, on the apex stones (connecting parts) there are roses and a star. A ledge under window runs around the gallery. The removal of the walls of the town fortification next to the church was necessary for the extension of the building to the east.

In 1414, St. Martin's pastor Jacob of Mies, a supporter and colleague of Jan Hus, gave Communion under both kinds for the first time in Bohemia. In 1433 a Hussite Assembly was held in the church of St. Martin's. Because it was an utraquist church, it was not destroyed during the Hussite wars.

The church gained its current ground plan during the late Gothic adaptations. The rebuilding was completed in 1488, thanks to funding by citizen Viktorin Holec, or Holas. He established a bridge from his house to the tribune of the church. During this period side naves were also built – the northern with three bays and southern part with two bays of cross ribbed vaults. The church gained today's ground plan. The portal of the main nave to the gallery in the northern nave is also late Gothic.

In 1595 a collection was started to repair the church, which was carried out in 1600. Then a new roof and cemetery fence were constructed, and the ossuary was also built, then the church was plastered and painted by master Jan Kohoutek. Painter Jakub Slánský completed the painting above the pulpit and Petr Smolík wrote the text of the Compacts of Basel on the walls. In 1611, the Chapel of St. Roch was established on the south side. In 1678 a fire destroyed the district of St. Martin, and the upper part of the steeple was rebuilt after the fire. In the lower part it was provided with a scarp. The church got a new roof, the Chapel of St. Eligius gained a beamed ceiling under the oratory which is still preserved.

=== Baroque modifications ===
A Baroque portal was built on the north side facing the street in 1779. Eventually the arcades between the naves were plastered. Soon afterwards, in 1784 the church was closed by an imperial decree by Emperor Joseph II and sold at auction on 29 August 1785. It became a residential house and was divided into two floors, the lower containing shops. The church was depicted in this way in Langweil's Model of Prague.

=== Reconstruction in the 20th century ===
In 1904 the church was bought by the City of Prague and in 1905 Kamil Hilbert began to reconstruct the church. During the reconstruction the chapel on the south side of the tower was removed and the tower roofing modified. In 1909, a commemorative plaque by Josef Mařatka of the Brokoff family, Jan and his sons Michael and Ferdinand, who are buried in the church, was placed on the north wall of the presbytery. After the World War I, the church was assigned to the Evangelical Church of Czech Brethren, which conducted general repairs.

== The building today ==
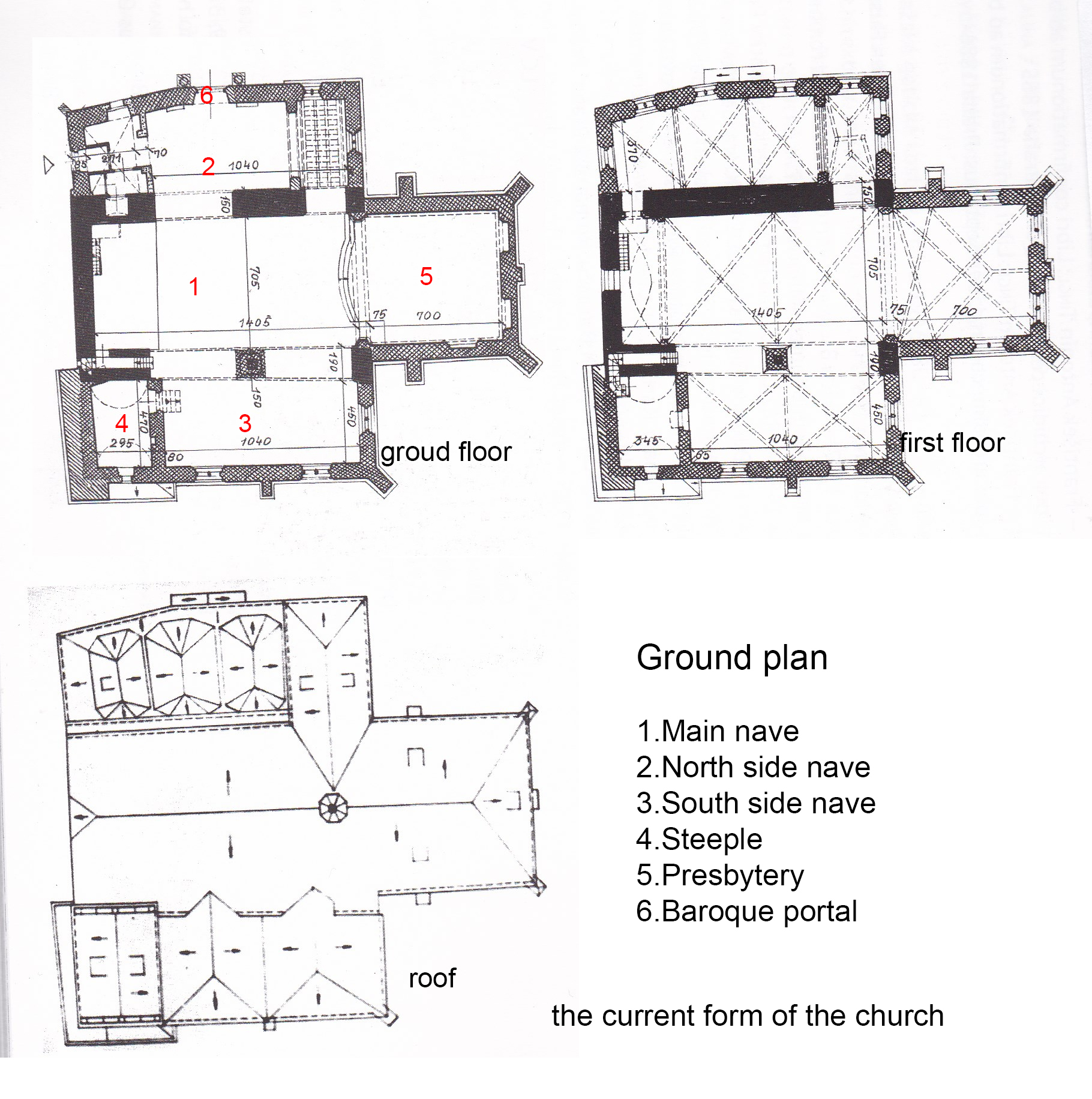
Groundplan of church St.Martin in the wall

The church has a pseudo-basilical plan with three naves. It has a square chancel and tower in the southwest corner. The ground is quite uneven due to frequent alterations.

=== Main nave ===
The nave is covered with a gable roof, over the presbytery with a hipped roof, and over the facade shield with a keel. The rectangular nave is vaulted with two almost square fields of the cross vault with an inter-vault rib. The centre console in the north wall is replaced with a semi-cylindrical console under which there is a flat pilaster. The western field in the width of the choir organ is bent with a pointed vault with a belt. On the vault there is coat of arms with the Czech lion. The north wall of the main nave with a triumphal arch at high pointed arch opens into the adjoining chapel of St. Eligius. Two semicircular heads of the former Romanesque vault were uncovered by Hilbert on the wall of the main nave; in the eastern head is a rectangular hole. The original saddle portal with the intersection leads from the north side of the organ-loft. The south wall of the main nave is broken into the side nave with two semicircular arcades on massive square bevelled block-style pillars. The organ-loft (choir) is vaulted with one field of cross-comb vaults. The railing is fully walled, strengthened with pentagonal pillars. Under the organ-loft there was discovered the lower choir. The Romanesque floor level runs here about 2 feet below.

=== North side nave ===
Over the northern side nave there are three hipped roofs. The north side nave has a uniaxial western wall, the ground floor has a neo-Gothic portal with Kamil Hilbert's initials dated 1906. The side northern facade is without buttresses and has four axial symmetry. The Gothic portal with profiled lining by Hilbert adds aedicula framing oval cartouche in the shield, it comes from the Baroque portal from the late 17th century. The cartridge is decorated with a baroque painting of St. Martin on horseback. The North side nave includes the oratory with star vault in the eastern part of the floor, completed with a circular bolt with a knight label. The corner consoles are in the shape of masks. The Chapel of St. Eligius under the oratory has a Baroque decking painted ceiling with ornamental, figural and animal motifs. The rest of the side nave is topped in a cross way with inter-vault ribs are also circular bolts. Next to the wall of the north side nave is the Renaissance tombstone of Milota of Dražice.

=== South side nave ===
The southern wing has two fields of cross vault, which is separated with a passport. Cuneiform one-trough ribs intersect circular bolts. The brackets are pyramid-shaped. They are decorated in a naturalistic way, with vegetable leaves. On the west wall at the steeple there is a pointed Gothic portal below the level of the present floor, which is raised by about 65 cm from the Gothic. Furthermore, there is a neo-Gothic entrance to the staircase to the steeple, built mainly of quarried stone. It has a ground floor and barrel vault. A Romanesque staircase in the thickness of the wall leads upstairs.

The south side nave has a sideways built abutment on the corner and two others on the south wall. Two broken windows with restored tracery lead into the nave on the eastern side and one on the eastern side. On the right by the upper part of the eastern abutment there is a rectangular plate inserted with a relief of a helmet with wings and fanfrnochs (Czech folk drums). The steeple is connected to the side wall of the nave. A sideways brick walled scarpa strengthens the corner. The north and south side of the steeple is breached with a big baroque semicircular window. The steeple is ended up with renaissance triangular gables.

=== Presbytery ===
The presbytery has a square ground plan. It is rectangular and with sideways ranking posts fitted on the corners. On the south side it is decorated with a stone owl, the northern with human figures in the shape of gargoyles. The presbytery is arched with a net vaulting. The ribs have a subtle pear profile. On the vault there is a coat of arms painted by Jan Kohoutek.

== Attractions ==
A legend is told about the church's gargoyle in the form of a little boy. According to the legend, a widow who lived near the church came home from work one day to find a crowd of people staring up at the roof of the church, where her unruly son was running on the sacred building. In anger she shouted "You villain, turn into stone for this sin!", at which point her curse became true, and the boy turned to stone with his tongue out, without even having time to stand up.

== See also ==
- Churches in Prague
