= Barbara of Karniów =

- Duchess of Oświęcim
- Born: c. 1445; Duchy of Krnov (Karniów)
- Died: 12 November 1510; Silesia
- Buried: Church of St. Martin in the Wall
- Noble family: Přemyslid dynasty (Opava–Ratibor branch)
- Spouse: Jan IV of Oświęcim
- Issue: Helena of Oświęcim
- Father: Nicholas V of Krnov
- Mother: Margaret Clemm of Ellguth

Barbara of Karniów (Czech: Barbora Krnovská; c. 1445 – 12 November 1510) was a member of the Opavian-Ratibor branch of the Přemyslid dynasty as the daughter of Nicholas V of Krnov and Margaret Clemm of Ellguth. She was the spouse of Jan IV of Oświęcim and Duchess of Oświęcim through this marriage.

== History ==
Barbara was the daughter of Nicholas V of Krnov and Margaret Clemm of Ellguth. Her paternal grandparents were John II, Duke of Opava-Ratibor and Helena of Lithuania, the niece of King Władysław II Jagiełło of Poland.

In 1475, Barbaria married Jan IV of Oświęcim, the third son of Duke Casimir I of Oświęcim by his first wife Anna, daughter of Duke Henry VIII the Sparrow. She became Duchess of Oświęcim through this marriage. Together they had one daughter, Helena of Oświęcim (1478/80 – aft. 1524).

In 1474, the Přemyslid dynasty lost the Silesian Duchy of Krnov during the Bohemian–Hungarian War to Matthias Corvinus. After Barbara's brother John IV, Duke of Krnov, died in 1483 as the last male descendant of the Krnov Přemyslid branch, she tried to regain his duchy and objected to Corvinus and his administration.

In 1492, Barbara and her husband were invested with the Duchy of Krnov by Vladislaus II of Hungary (successor of Corvinus as King of Hungary and Croatia), after he enfeoffed his chancellor Johann von Schellenberg with Krnov and after negotiations between the parties lead to Barbara's daughter Helena marrying von Schellenberg's son Jiří (George) of Schellenberg.

Barbara died on 12 November 1510 and was buried at the Church of St. Martin in the Wall.
