= Jacobellis =

Jacobellis may refer to:

- Jacobellis v. Ohio, a United States Supreme Court decision of 1964 on obscenity
- Lindsey Jacobellis (born 1985), American snowboarder

== See also ==
- Jacob of Mies (Latin: Jacobellus de Misa; 1372–1429), Czech reformer
