= Bukal =

Bukal may refer to:

== People ==
- Bukal, the Indigenous language name of Australian scholar Henrietta Marrie
- Josip Bukal (1945-2016), Yugoslav and Bosnian footballer
- Vladimir Bukal (1939–2008), Croatian chess player

== Other uses ==
- Bukal, Sulawesi, Indonesia; see Buol Regency
- Bukál, another name for fanfrnoch, a Czech percussion instrument
