= Jan IV of Oświęcim =

Jan IV
- Duke of Oświęcim, Gliwice
- Coat-of-arms of Upper Silesia (Opole, Oświęcim, Gliwice, etc).
- Born: c. 1426
- Died: 1497
- Noble family: Silesian Piasts of Opole
- Spouses: Katharina; Barbara of Karniów
- Issue: Helena of Oświęcim
- Father: Casimir I of Oświęcim
- Mother: Anna of Żagań

Jan IV of Oświęcim (Polish: Jan IV oświęcimski; c. 1426 – 1497), was a Duke of Oświęcim during 1434–1456 (until 1445 with his brothers as co-rulers) and Duke of Gliwice from 1465 to 1482.

He was the third son of Duke Casimir I of Oświęcim by his first wife Anna, daughter of Duke Henry VIII of Żagań.

== Life ==
At the time of his father's death in 1434 Jan IV was still a minor, so he was placed under the care of his older brother Wenceslaus I.

In 1441, Wenceslaus I agreed to become a vassal of the King of Poland in exchange for the rights to govern the Duchy of Zator (it would be given to them in 1440 and in 1441 Wacław would officially become a vassal). This step was also followed by Jan IV and his brother Przemysław.

On 19 January 1445 was made the formal division of the Duchy between Casimir I's sons. Despite the fact that he was the youngest brother, Jan IV received Oświęcim, the capital of the Duchy, and the towns of Kęty, Żywiec and half of Gliwice.

Since the beginning of his reign Jan IV joined in adventurous politics with his Silesian cousin. One of his first decisions was not recognized the purchase of Siewierz by the Bishop of Kraków, Zbigniew Oleśnicki. This has led to increased tensions between him and the Polish nobles, even resulting in some border wars (common for that period in medieval Europe). The struggle for Siewierz lasted until 1447, when Jan IV finally accepted the ownership of the Bishop.

In 1448 it seemed that the Jan IV's anti-Polish politics were definitively ended when he signed a border agreement with Kingdom of Poland: however, soon their relations worsened. In 1452, and for unknown reasons, Duke Przemysław of Toszek attack Siewierz. The Polish troops, under the command of Piotr Szafraniec, used this as an excuse to attack Jan IV, and sieged his castle of Barwałd. The Duke of Oświęcim saved his lands only after the payment of 2,000 fines to Piotr Szafraniec. But Jan IV, after these humiliating conditions, refused to surrender, and with the plague over the Poland, he looted Polish borderlands, advanced over Lesser Poland and even approached Kraków, the Polish capital itself, on a daring raid.

The reaction of the Polish King wasn't long in coming. In 1453, a large Polish army under the command of the Starost Jan Szczekocki and the Chamberlain Jan Kuropatwa, invaded his Duchy in retribution. Unable to face the powerful Polish army, he was defeated and on 25 January he decided to capitulate. The Polish King gave him two choices: the vassalization or selling of the Duchy.

Despite his defeat, Jan IV didn't change his conduct and soon after he began the siege of Oświęcim, then under the hands of Jan z Czyżowa. This expedition was unsuccessful, so Jan IV withdrew to the Wolek Castle, from where he conducted trips to the Lesser Poland area.

Eventually, Jan IV accepted that he had lost all chances for victory, and in 1454 he finally agreed to sell his Duchy to the Kingdom of Poland for 20,000 groszes. The sale was confirmed in the act of homage made by the Duchy on 19 March 1454, during the festivities for the King's marriage with Elisabeth of Austria. The Act came into force on 11 October 1456, when King Casimir IV promised to Jan IV the payment of 21,000 pieces of gold and 4,300 fines.

Jan IV briefly joined the Prussian Confederation army as a mercenary during the Thirteen Years' War (one of the Polish-Teutonic Wars). However, the Polish king, Casimir IV Jagiellon, delayed the payment of the promised amount in 1454 and he returned to his homeland with mercenaries and allies from Prussia and located his base of operations in Myślenice, and began his efforts to recover his lost Duchy. Eventually, on 26 June 1458 in Bytom, the Polish King decided to pay him fully to stop the troubles (at the end, the King only gave him 11,000 pieces of gold and he would finish the payment only in 1462) and Jan IV retired from Myślenice, who was burned by the Polish troops.

In 1460, after the death of Bolko V the Hussite, Duke of Opole, Jan IV tried to claim his domains, but was defeated by Bolko V's brother, Nicholas I.

In 1462, with money from the Polish King, he bought Gliwice with its castle from his brother Przemysław, as well as nearby Ujazd from the Bishopric of Wrocław and he became the Duke of Gliwice in 1465.

In 1471, Jan IV and his brother Przemysław supported the election of Władysław Jagiellon as King of Bohemia, which resulted in the beginning of hostile relations with the other candidate for the throne, the Hungarian King Matthias Corvinus. On 27 February 1475 during a meeting in Racibórz, King Matthias arrested Jan IV, and only released him after he give up half of his lands and later. However, the King only secured the fidelity of Jan IV on 12 August 1479, when he paid homage to him in Olomouc.

In 1482, and for unknown reasons, Jan IV sold the rest of his lands in Gliwice; in 1484 he inherited Toszek after the death of his brother Przemysław, but almost immediately the land was confiscated by King Matthias, who claimed more dubious rights to them.

Little is known about Jan IV's last years. He probably retired to the Duchy of Karniów, inherited by his second wife in 1491. Jan IV died around 1496–1497 and was probably buried in Karniów.

== Marriages and Issue ==
By 30 December 1465, Jan IV married firstly with certain Katharina, whose origins are unknown.

Around 1475, Jan IV married secondly with Barbara (b. 1445 – d. 27 April 1510), daughter of Duke Nicholas V of Karniów. She succeeded in 1491 as Duchess of Karniów. They had one daughter:

1. Helena (b. 1478/80 – d. aft. 1524), married in 1492 to Baron George of Schellenberg.

== Ancestry ==
Ancestors of Jan IV of Oświęcim

16. Casimir I, Duke of Cieszyn
8. Przemyslaus I Noszak, Duke of Cieszyn
17. Euphemia of Czersk-Warsaw
4. Przemysław of Oświęcim
18. Bolesław of Bytom
9. Elisabeth of Koźle-Bytom
19. Margareta of Sternberg
2. Casimir I of Oświęcim
1. Jan IV of Oświęcim
24. Henry IV the Faithful
12. Henry V of Iron
25. Matilda of Brandenburg-Salzwedel
6. Henry VIII the Sparrow
26. Wenceslaus of Płock
13. Anna of Płock
27. Elisabeth of Lithuania
3. Anna of Żagań
28. Bolko II of Opole
14. Vladislaus II of Opole
29. Elisabeth of Świdnica
7. Katharina of Opole
30. András Lackfi, Voivode of Transylvania or Nicolae Alexandru Bassaraba, Voivode of Wallachia
15. Elisabeth

Jan IV of Oświęcim House of Piast Born: between 1426 and 1430 Died: c. 21 February 1497
Regnal titles
Preceded by Casimir I	Duke of Oświęcim with Wenceslaus I and Przemysław (until 1445); 1434–1456	Succeeded by Annexed by the Kingdom of Bohemia
Preceded by Przemysław	Duke of Toszek; 1484	Succeeded by Annexed by the Kingdom of Bohemia
Preceded by János Corvinus	Duke of Karniów with Barbara; 1491–1493	Succeeded by Johann II of Schellenberg
