= List of excommunicable offences from the Council of Constance =

The Council of Constance was a Roman Catholic Ecumenical Council held between 1414-1418 in the town of Constance in southern Germany. It marked the ending of the Western Schism that had plagued the church for the previous decades when the church was divided between two rival claimants to the papacy, one in Rome and the other in Avignon. The council was held largely to resolve this dispute. On the same occasion, however, it also discussed the writings and preachings of John Wycliffe and Jan Hus, both of whom were condemned by the council.

The Council enacted a number of canons that were henceforth included in the church's canon law, which punished Catholics with excommunication if they subscribed to various heresies named at the Council. These canons remained in legal force for centuries; the modern code of canon law replaced them.

== Excommunications related to John Wycliffe's writings ==
1. any Catholic who preaches, teaches or holds to the teachings of the books of John Wycliffe
2. all Catholics who subscribe to this article of John Wycliffe: '1. Just as Christ is God and man at the same time, so the consecrated host is at the same time the body of Christ and true bread. For it is Christ's body at least in figure and true bread in nature; or, which comes to the same thing, it is true bread naturally and Christ's body figuratively.'
3. all Catholics who subscribe to this article of John Wycliffe: '2. Since heretical falsehood about the consecrated host is the most important point in individual heresies, I therefore declare to modern heretics, in order that this falsehood may be eradicated from the church, that they cannot explain or understand an accident without a subject. And therefore all these heretical sects belong to the number of those who ignore the fourth chapter of John: We worship what we know.'
4. all Catholics who subscribe to this article of John Wycliffe: 3. 'I boldly foretell to all these sects and their accomplices that even by the time Christ and all the church triumphant come at the final judgment riding at the trumpet blast of the angel Gabriel, they shall still not have proved to the faithful that the sacrament is an accident without a subject.'
5. all Catholics who subscribe to this article of John Wycliffe: 4. Just as John was Elias in a figurative sense and not in person, so the bread on the altar is Christ's body in a figurative sense. And the words, This is my body, are unambiguously figurative, just like the statement "John is Elias".
6. all Catholics who subscribe to this article of John Wycliffe: 5. The fruit of this madness whereby it is pretended that there can be an accident without a subject is to blaspheme against God, to scandalise the saints and to deceive the church by means of false doctrines about accidents.
7. all Catholics who subscribe to this article of John Wycliffe: 6. Those who claim that the children of the faithful dying without sacramental baptism will not be saved, are stupid and presumptuous in saying this.
8. all Catholics who subscribe to this article of John Wycliffe: 7. The slight and short confirmation by bishops, with whatever extra solemnised rites, was introduced at the devil's suggestion so that the people might be deluded in the church's faith and the solemnity and necessity of bishops might be believed in the more.
9. all Catholics who subscribe to this article of John Wycliffe: 8. As for the oil with which bishops anoint boys and the linen cloth which goes around the head, it seems that this is a trivial rite which is unfounded in scripture; and that this confirmation, which was introduced after the apostles, blasphemes against God.
10. all Catholics who subscribe to this article of John Wycliffe: 9. Oral confession to a priest, introduced by Innocent [33], is not as necessary to people as he claimed. For if anyone offends his brother in thought, word or deed, then it suffices to repent in thought, word or deed.
11. all Catholics who subscribe to this article of John Wycliffe: 10. It is a grave and unsupported practice for a priest to hear the confessions of the people in the way that the Latins use.
12. all Catholics who subscribe to this article of John Wycliffe: 11. In these words, You are clean, but not all are, the devil has laid a snare of the unfaithful ones in order to catch the Christian's foot. For he introduced private confession, which cannot be justified, and after the person's malice has been revealed to the confessor, as he decreed in the law, it is not revealed to the people.
13. all Catholics who subscribe to this article of John Wycliffe: 12. It is a probable conjecture that a person who lives rightly is a deacon or a priest. For just as I infer that this person is John, so I recognise by a probable conjecture that this person, by his holy life, has been placed by God in such an office or state.
14. all Catholics who subscribe to this article of John Wycliffe: 13. The probable evidence for such a state is to be taken from proof provided by the person's deeds and not from the testimony of the person ordaining him. For God can place someone in such a state without the need of an instrument of this kind, no matter whether the instrument is worthy or unworthy. There is no more probable evidence than the person's life. Therefore, if there is present a holy life and catholic doctrine, this suffices for the church militant. (Error at the beginning and at the end.)
15. all Catholics who subscribe to this article of John Wycliffe: 14. The bad life of a prelate means that his subjects do not receive orders and the other sacraments. They can receive them from such persons, however, when there is urgent need, if they devoutly beseech God to supply on behalf of his diabolical ministers the actions and purpose of the office to which they have bound themselves by oath.
16. all Catholics who subscribe to this article of John Wycliffe: 15. People of former times would copulate with each other out of desire for temporal gain or for mutual help or to relieve concupiscence, even when they had no hope of offspring; for they were truly copulating as married persons.
17. all Catholics who subscribe to this article of John Wycliffe: 16. The words, I will take you as wife, are more suitable for the marriage contract than, I take you as wife. And the first words ought not to be annulled by the second words about the present, when someone contracts with one wife in the words referring to the future and afterwards with another wife in those referring to the present.
18. all Catholics who subscribe to this article of John Wycliffe: 17. The pope, who falsely calls himself the servant of God's servants, has no status in the work of the gospel but only in the work of the world. If he has any rank, it is in the order of demons, of those who serve God rather in a blameworthy way.
19. all Catholics who subscribe to this article of John Wycliffe: 18. The pope does not dispense from simony or from a rash vow, since he is the chief simoniac who rashly vows to preserve, to his damnation, his status here on the way. (Error at the end.)
20. all Catholics who subscribe to this article of John Wycliffe: 19. That the pope is supreme pontiff is ridiculous. Christ approved such a dignity neither in Peter nor in anyone else.
21. all Catholics who subscribe to this article of John Wycliffe: 20. The pope is antichrist made manifest. Not only this particular person but also the multitude of popes, from the time of the endowment of the church, of cardinals, of bishops and of their other accomplices, make up the composite, monstrous person of antichrist. This is not altered by the fact that Gregory and other popes, who did many good and fruitful things in their lives, finally repented.
22. all Catholics who subscribe to this article of John Wycliffe: 21. Peter and Clement, together with the other helpers in the faith, were not popes but God's helpers in the work of building up the church of our lord Jesus Christ.
23. all Catholics who subscribe to this article of John Wycliffe: 22. To say that papal pre-eminence originated with the faith of the gospel is as false as to say that every error arose from the original truth.
24. all Catholics who subscribe to this article of John Wycliffe: 23. There are twelve procurators and disciples of antichrist: the pope, cardinals, patriarchs, archbishops, bishops, archdeacons, officials, deans, monks, canons with their two-peaked hats, the recently introduced pseudo-friars, and pardoners.
25. all Catholics who subscribe to this article of John Wycliffe: 24. It is clear that whoever is the humbler, of greater service to the church, and the more fervent in Christ's love towards his church, is the greater in the church militant and to be reckoned the most immediate vicar of Christ.
26. all Catholics who subscribe to this article of John Wycliffe: 25. Whoever holds any of God's goods unjustly, is taking the things of others by rapine, theft or robbery.
27. all Catholics who subscribe to this article of John Wycliffe: 26. Neither the depositions of witnesses, nor a judge's sentence, nor physical possession, nor inheritance, nor an exchange between persons, nor a gift, nor all such things taken together, confer dominion or a right to anything upon a person without grace. (An error, if it is understood as referring to sanctifying grace.)
28. all Catholics who subscribe to this article of John Wycliffe: 27. Unless the interior law of charity is present, nobody has more or less authority or righteousness on account of charters or bulls. We ought not to lend or give anything to a sinner so long as we know that he is such, for thus we would be assisting a traitor of our God.
29. all Catholics who subscribe to this article of John Wycliffe: 28. Just as a prince or a lord does not keep the title of his office while he is in mortal sin, except in name and equivocally, so it is with a pope, bishop or priest while he has fallen into mortal sin.
30. all Catholics who subscribe to this article of John Wycliffe: 29. Everyone habitually in mortal sin lacks dominion of any kind and the licit use of an action, even if it be good in its kind.
31. all Catholics who subscribe to this article of John Wycliffe: 30. It is known from the principles of the faith that a person in mortal sin, sins mortally in every action.
32. all Catholics who subscribe to this article of John Wycliffe: 31. In order to have true secular dominion, the lord must be in a state of righteousness. Therefore, nobody in mortal sin is lord of anything.
33. all Catholics who subscribe to this article of John Wycliffe: 32. All modern religious necessarily become marked as hypocrites. For their profession demands that they fast, act and clothe themselves in a particular way, and thus they observe everything differently from other people.
34. all Catholics who subscribe to this article of John Wycliffe: 33. All private religion as such savours of imperfection and sin whereby a person is indisposed to serve God freely.
35. all Catholics who subscribe to this article of John Wycliffe: 34. A private religious order or rule savours of a blasphemous and arrogant presumption towards God. And the religious of such orders dare to exalt themselves above the apostles by the hypocrisy of defending their religion.
36. all Catholics who subscribe to this article of John Wycliffe: 35. Christ does not teach in scripture about any kind of religious order in antichrist's chapter. Therefore, it is not his good pleasure that there should be such orders. The chapter is composed, however, of the following twelve types: the pope, cardinals, patriarchs, archbishops, bishops, archdeacons, officials, deans, monks, canons, friars of the four orders, and pardoners.
37. all Catholics who subscribe to this article of John Wycliffe: 36. I infer as evident from the faith and works of the four sects—which are the caesarean clergy, the various monks, the various canons, and the friars-that nobody belonging to them is a member of Christ in the catalogue of the saints, unless he forsakes in the end the sect which he stupidly embraced.
38. all Catholics who subscribe to this article of John Wycliffe: 37. Paul was once a pharisee but abandoned the sect for the better sect of Christ, with his permission. This is the reason why cloistered persons, of whatever sect or rule, or by whatever stupid vow they may be bound, ought freely to cast off these chains, at Christ's command, and freely join the sect of Christ.
39. all Catholics who subscribe to this article of John Wycliffe: 38. It is sufficient for the laity that at some times they give tithes of their produce to God's servants. In this way they are always giving to the church, even if not always to the caesarean clergy deputed by the pope or by his dependents.
40. all Catholics who subscribe to this article of John Wycliffe: 39. The powers that are claimed by the pope and the other four new sects are pretended and were diabolically introduced in order to seduce subjects; such are excommunications by caesarean prelates, citations, imprisoning, and the sale of money rents.
41. all Catholics who subscribe to this article of John Wycliffe: 40. Many simple priests surpass prelates in such power. Indeed, it appears to the faithful that greatness of spiritual power belongs more to a son who imitates Christ in his way of life than to a prelate who has been elected by cardinals and similar apostates.
42. all Catholics who subscribe to this article of John Wycliffe: 41. The people may withhold tithes, offerings and other private alms from unworthy disciples of Christ, since God's law requires this. The curse or censure imposed by antichrist's disciples is not to be feared but rather is to be received with joy. The lord pope and bishops and all religious or simple clerics, with titles to perpetual possession, ought to renounce them into the hands of the secular arm. If they stubbornly refuse, they ought to be compelled to do so by the secular lords.
43. all Catholics who subscribe to this article of John Wycliffe: 42. There is no greater heretic or antichrist than the cleric who teaches that it is lawful for priests and levites of the law of grace to be endowed with temporal possessions. The clerics who teach this are heretics or blasphemers if ever there were any.
44. all Catholics who subscribe to this article of John Wycliffe: 43. Temporal lords not only can take away goods of fortune from a church that is habitually sinning, nor is it only lawful for them to do so, but indeed they are obliged to do so under pain of eternal damnation.
45. all Catholics who subscribe to this article of John Wycliffe: 44. God does not approve that anyone be judged or condemned by civil law.
46. all Catholics who subscribe to this article of John Wycliffe: 45. If an objection is made against those who oppose endowments for the church, by pointing to Benedict, Gregory and Bernard, who possessed few temporal goods in poverty, it may be said in reply that they repented at the end. If you object further that I merely pretend that these saints finally repented of their falling away from God's law in this way, then you may teach that they are saints and I will teach that they repented at the end.
47. all Catholics who subscribe to this article of John Wycliffe: 46. If we ought to believe in sacred scripture and in reason, it is clear that Christ's disciples do not have the authority to exact temporal goods by means of censures, and those who attempt this are sons of Eli and of Belial.
48. all Catholics who subscribe to this article of John Wycliffe: 47. Each essence has one suppositum, following which another suppositum, equal to the first, is produced. This is the most perfect immanent action possible to nature.
49. all Catholics who subscribe to this article of John Wycliffe: 48. Each essence, whether corporeal or incorporeal, is common to three supposita; and the properties, the accidents and the operations inhere in common in all of them.
50. all Catholics who subscribe to this article of John Wycliffe: 49. God cannot annihilate anything, nor increase or diminish the world, but he can create souls up to a certain number, and not beyond it.
51. all Catholics who subscribe to this article of John Wycliffe: 50. It is impossible for two corporeal substances to be co-extensive, the one continuously at rest in a place and the other continuously penetrating the body of Christ at rest.
52. all Catholics who subscribe to this article of John Wycliffe: 51. Any continuous mathematical line is composed of two, three or four contiguous points, or of only a simply finite number of points; and time is, was and will be composed of contiguous instants. It is not possible that time and a line, if they exist, are composed of in this way. (The first part is a philosophical error, the last part is an error with regard to God's power.)
53. all Catholics who subscribe to this article of John Wycliffe: 52. It must be supposed that one corporeal substance was formed at its beginning as composed of indivisibles, and that it occupies every possible place.
54. all Catholics who subscribe to this article of John Wycliffe: 53. Every person is God.
55. all Catholics who subscribe to this article of John Wycliffe: 54. Every creature is God.
56. all Catholics who subscribe to this article of John Wycliffe: 55. Every being is everywhere, since every being is God.
57. all Catholics who subscribe to this article of John Wycliffe: 56. All things that happen, happen from absolute necessity.
58. all Catholics who subscribe to this article of John Wycliffe: 57. A baptised child foreknown as damned will necessarily live long enough to sin in the holy Spirit, wherefore it will merit to be condemned for ever. Thus no fire can burn the child until that time or instant.
59. all Catholics who subscribe to this article of John Wycliffe: 58. I assert as a matter of faith that everything that will happen, will happen of necessity. Thus if Paul is foreknown as damned, he cannot truly repent; that is, he cannot cancel the sin of final impenitence by contrition, or be under the obligation not to have the sin.
60. all Catholics who subscribe to this article of John Wycliffe: 1. The material substance of bread, and similarly the material substance of wine, remain in the sacrament of the altar.
61. all Catholics who subscribe to this article of John Wycliffe: 2. The accidents of bread do not remain without their subject in the said sacrament.
62. all Catholics who subscribe to this article of John Wycliffe: 3. Christ is not identically and really present in the said sacrament in his own bodily persona.
63. all Catholics who subscribe to this article of John Wycliffe: 4. If a bishop or a priest is in mortal sin, he does not ordain or confect or consecrate or baptise.
64. all Catholics who subscribe to this article of John Wycliffe: 5. That Christ instituted the mass has no basis in the gospel.
65. all Catholics who subscribe to this article of John Wycliffe: 6. God ought to obey the devil.
66. all Catholics who subscribe to this article of John Wycliffe: 7. If a person is duly contrite, all exterior confession is superfluous and useless for him.
67. all Catholics who subscribe to this article of John Wycliffe: 8. If a pope is foreknown as damned and is evil, and is therefore a limb of the devil, he does not have authority over the faithful given to him by anyone, except perhaps by the emperor.
68. all Catholics who subscribe to this article of John Wycliffe: 9. Nobody should be considered as pope after Urban VI. Rather, people should live like the Greeks, under their own laws.
69. all Catholics who subscribe to this article of John Wycliffe: 10. It is against sacred scripture for ecclesiastics to have possessions.
70. all Catholics who subscribe to this article of John Wycliffe: 11. No prelate should excommunicate anyone unless he first knows that the person has been excommunicated by God; he who does so thereby becomes a heretic and an excommunicated person.
71. all Catholics who subscribe to this article of John Wycliffe: 12. A prelate excommunicating a cleric who has appealed to the king or the king's council is thereby a traitor to the king and the kingdom.
72. all Catholics who subscribe to this article of John Wycliffe: 13. Those who stop preaching or hearing the word of God on account of an excommunication issued by men are themselves excommunicated and will be regarded as traitors of Christ on the day of judgment.
73. all Catholics who subscribe to this article of John Wycliffe: 14. It is lawful for any deacon or priest to preach the word of God without authorisation from the apostolic see or from a catholic bishop.
74. all Catholics who subscribe to this article of John Wycliffe: 15. Nobody is a civil lord or a prelate or a bishop while he is in mortal sin.
75. all Catholics who subscribe to this article of John Wycliffe: 16. Secular lords can confiscate temporal goods from the church at their discretion when those who possess them are sinning habitually, that is to say sinning from habit and not just in particular acts.
76. all Catholics who subscribe to this article of John Wycliffe: 17. The people can correct sinful lords at their discretion.
77. all Catholics who subscribe to this article of John Wycliffe: 18. Tithes are purely alms, and parishioners can withhold them at will on account of their prelates' sins.
78. all Catholics who subscribe to this article of John Wycliffe: 19. Special prayers applied by prelates or religious to a particular person avail him or her no more than general prayers, if other things are equal.
79. all Catholics who subscribe to this article of John Wycliffe: 20. Whoever gives alms to friars is thereby excommunicated.
80. all Catholics who subscribe to this article of John Wycliffe: 21. Whoever enters any religious order whatsoever, whether it be of the possessioners or the mendicants, makes himself less apt and suitable for the observance of God's commands.
81. all Catholics who subscribe to this article of John Wycliffe: 22. Saints who have founded religious orders have sinned in so doing.
82. all Catholics who subscribe to this article of John Wycliffe: 23. Members of religious orders are not members of the Christian religion.
83. all Catholics who subscribe to this article of John Wycliffe: 24. Friars are bound to obtain their food by manual work and not by begging
84. all Catholics who subscribe to this article of John Wycliffe: 25. All are simoniacs who bind themselves to pray for people who help them in temporal matters.
85. all Catholics who subscribe to this article of John Wycliffe: 26. The prayer of someone foreknown as damned profits nobody.
86. all Catholics who subscribe to this article of John Wycliffe: 27. All things happen from absolute necessity.
87. all Catholics who subscribe to this article of John Wycliffe: 28. Confirming the young, ordaining clerics and consecrating places have been reserved to the pope and bishops because of their greed for temporal gain and honour.
88. all Catholics who subscribe to this article of John Wycliffe: 29. Universities, places of study, colleges, degrees and academic exercises in these institutions were introduced by a vain pagan spirit and benefit the church as little as does the devil.
89. all Catholics who subscribe to this article of John Wycliffe: 30. Excommunication by a pope or any prelate is not to be feared since it is a censure of antichrist.
90. all Catholics who subscribe to this article of John Wycliffe: 31. Those who found religious houses sin, and those who enter them belong to the devil.
91. all Catholics who subscribe to this article of John Wycliffe: 32. It is against Christ's command to enrich the clergy.
92. all Catholics who subscribe to this article of John Wycliffe: 33. Pope Silvester and the emperor Constantine erred in endowing the church.
93. all Catholics who subscribe to this article of John Wycliffe: 34. All the members of mendicant orders are heretics, and those who give them alms are excommunicated.
94. all Catholics who subscribe to this article of John Wycliffe: 35. Those who enter a religious or other order thereby become incapable of observing God's commands, and consequently of reaching the kingdom of heaven, unless they leave them.
95. all Catholics who subscribe to this article of John Wycliffe: 36. The pope with all his clerics who have property are heretics, for the very reason that they have property; and so are all who abet them, namely all secular lords and other laity.
96. all Catholics who subscribe to this article of John Wycliffe: 37. The Roman church is Satan's synagogue; and the pope is not the immediate and proximate vicar of Christ and the apostles.
97. all Catholics who subscribe to this article of John Wycliffe: 38. The decretal letters are apocryphal and seduce people from Christ's faith, and clerics who study them are fools.
98. all Catholics who subscribe to this article of John Wycliffe: 39. The emperor and secular lords were seduced by the devil to endow the church with temporal goods.
99. all Catholics who subscribe to this article of John Wycliffe: 40. The election of a pope by the cardinals was introduced by the devil.
100. all Catholics who subscribe to this article of John Wycliffe: 41. It is not necessary for salvation to believe that the Roman church is supreme among the other churches.
101. all Catholics who subscribe to this article of John Wycliffe: 42. It is ridiculous to believe in the indulgences of popes and bishops.
102. all Catholics who subscribe to this article of John Wycliffe: 43. Oaths taken to confirm civil commerce and contracts between people are unlawful.
103. all Catholics who subscribe to this article of John Wycliffe: 44. Augustine, Benedict and Bernard are damned, unless they repented of having owned property and of having founded and entered religious orders; and thus they are all heretics from the pope down to the lowest religious.
104. all Catholics who subscribe to this article of John Wycliffe: 45. All religious orders alike were introduced by the devil.

== Other Excommunications ==
1. anyone who, while attending the council, uses idle stories, jokes, engages in stubborn disputes or raises his voice too loudly is punished with a 3-day excommunication
2. any priest who offers the Eucharist under both species (bread and wine) to laypersons is excommunicated (at this time period, only the bread was offered to laity, see article Communion under both kinds)
3. any person, even should he be a cardinal or a pope, is automatically excommunicated if he engages in simony by buying a position in the church
