= Anton Depauly =

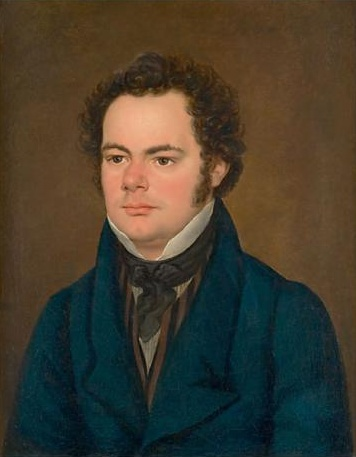
- An 1827 oil painting of Franz Schubert by Depauly, first attributed to Joseph Mähler.
- Born: Anton Felix Depauly; 1799; Mies, Bohemia
- Died: - Mies, Bohemia, Austrian Empire
- Education: Academy of Fine Arts Vienna
- Known for: Painting
- Notable work: Portrait of Franz Schubert

Anton Felix Depauly (1799 – ?) was a Bohemian-born painter of the Austrian Empire, known primarily for his portraits and historical paintings.

== Life and career ==
Depauly was born in Mies (now Stříbro, Czech Republic) to Johann Depauly, a municipal archivist, and Elisabetha née Schmid. He attended the Academy of Fine Arts Vienna starting in 1815.

After completing his studies, Depauly married and established a family. He initially worked in Vienna. Around the 1840s, he relocated back to Bohemia, continuing his portrait work.

Depauly is notable for depicting composer Franz Schubert without his glasses. This painting was added to the portrait gallery of the Gesellschaft der Musikfreunde in Vienna.
