= Helena of Oświęcim =

Helena of Oświęcim (Polish: Helena Oświęcimska; 1478/80 – after 1524), was a Polish princess and member of the House of Piast from the Oświęcim branch and ruling Duchess of Karniów from 1506 to 1523.

== Life ==
Helena was the only child of Duke Jan IV of Oświęcim by his second wife Barbara, daughter of Duke Nicholas V of Karniów and Margaret Clemm of Ellguth.

Helena's father lost his Duchy of Oświęcim in 1456 and the rest of his lands in 1482. In 1491 her parents were invested with the Duchy of Karniów by the Bohemian King Vladislaus II of Hungary, because Helena's mother was the last representative of the Ducal line, extinct after the death of Duke Jan IV the Elder in 1483.

In 1492 Helena married with Baron Jiří (George) of Schellenberg. One year later (in 1493), Helena's parents were dispossessed from Karniów when the King Władysław II Jagiellon bestowed the Duchy to Baron Johann II, Helena's father-in-law. Johann II died in 1506 and was succeeded by his son George, who also ruled by right of his wife, as the last heir of the Karniów branch of the Piast dynasty.

During her marriage, Helena gave birth four children: three sons (George, Johann III and Jarosław) and one daughter (Alena or Helena).

In 1523, Duke George sold Karniów with Głubczyce to George, Margrave of Brandenburg-Ansbach. Helena probably died shortly afterwards.

Regnal titles
Preceded by Johann II of Schellenberg	Duke of Karniów with George; 1506–1523	Succeeded by George, Margrave of Brandenburg-Ansbach
