= Stříbro bridge =

Bridge in Plzeň Region, Czech Republic

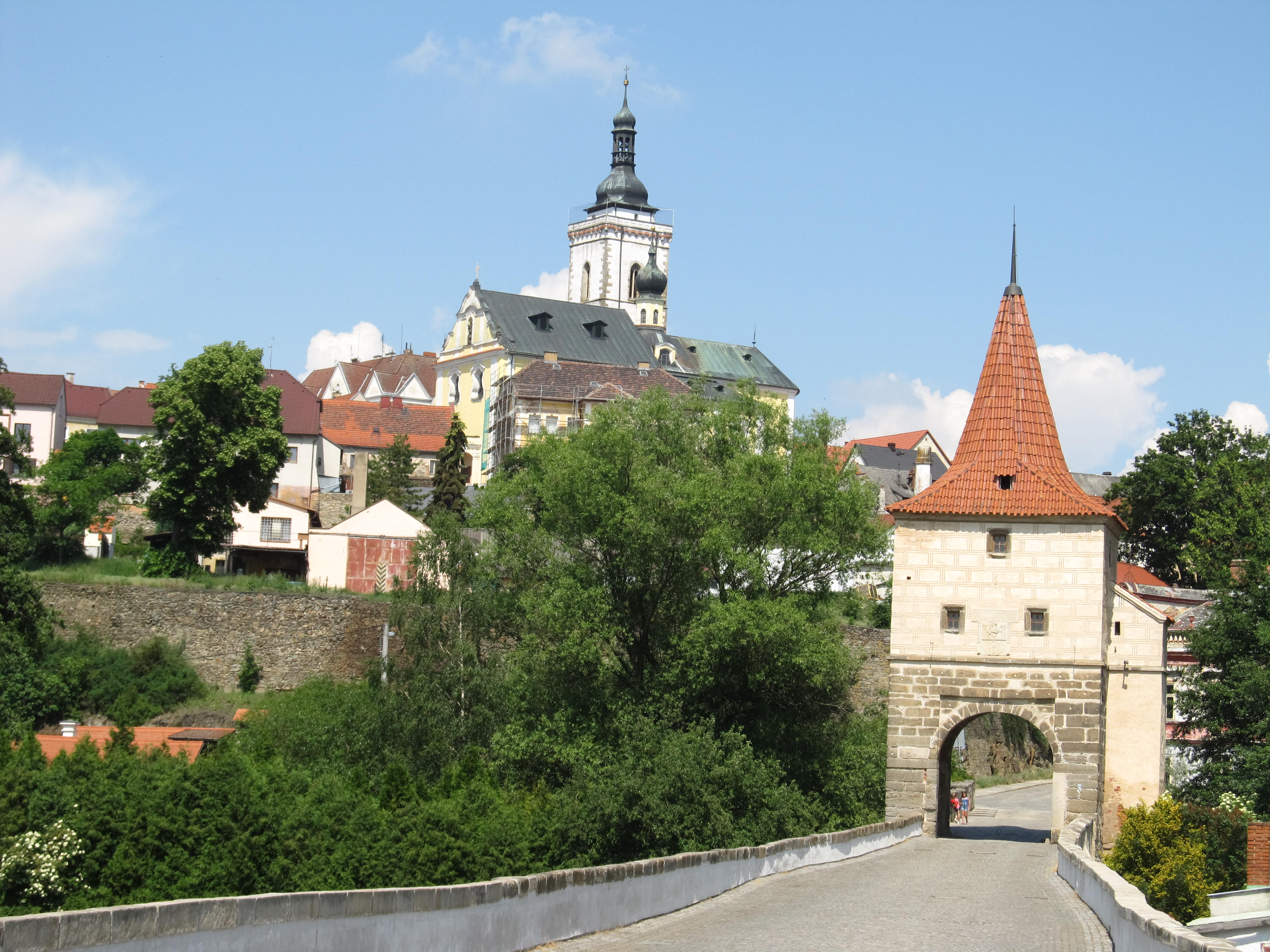
- Renaissance bridge in Stříbro
- Coordinates: 49.750315°N 13.001316°E
- Crosses: Mže
- Locale: Stříbro, Plzeň Region, Czech Republic
- Official name: Renesanční most
- Heritage status: Cultural monument

Characteristics
- Material: Stone, sandstone
- Total length: 60 metres (200 ft)
- Width: 6 metres (20 ft)

History
- Construction start: 1755
- Opened: 1560

Location
- Interactive map of Stříbro bridge

Stříbro bridge (Czech: most ve Stříbře) is a Renaissance stone five-arched bridge spanning across the river Mže in Stříbro, Czech Republic. The bridge has one preserved passage tower, built between 1555 and 1560 by Benedict Volch of Ferrol. It was part of the access road to the town of Stříbro from Plzeň and Prague. Today the bridge is designed for pedestrian traffic only.

It was declared a Czech cultural monument in 1958 and has been part of the Stříbro urban monument zone since 1992.

== Description ==
From a technical point of view, the bridge consists of two parts. The first part includes two arches crossing the river Mže and the second part consists of three smaller arches that serve as the "flood bridge". The bridges are not coaxial and there is a bridge gate between them that is supported by a 5.15 metre wide pillar. The tower facade is decorated with letter sgraffito, and the original hexagonal pyramid roof is covered with pantiles. The bridge tower complemented the fortifications of the then very important and rich upper town. It also served as a road toll collection point.

The bridge is made from sandstone blocks, it is 60 metres long, its width is almost 6 metres. Sandstone used for the construction was mined in local quarries near Těchlovice.

The bridge protector saint is St. John of Nepomuk. The original sculpture by Lazar Widman dates back to 1721. The original was moved to the town museum. The replica placed on the bridge was sculpted by Jaroslav Šindelář in 2005 during the bridge reconstruction.

The structure is still preserved in its original form, except for the US Army inscriptions added in 1945, which can be found above both tower portals.

== Reconstruction ==
Until 2000, the historic bridge served road traffic. In 2001, the major overhaul of the tower and the bridge began. The bridge disrepair has further deteriorated during the 2002 flood. The restoration of the tower, the St. John of Nepomuk statue and the bridge itself continued steadily until 2005 when the reconstruction of the inundation part of the bridge body started. The repair proceeded as the funds were made available. In 2015, after 15 years of gradual repairs, the extensive bridge renovation was concluded with the overall cost reaching nearly CZK 20 million.

== Recognition ==
There are only two bridges with bridge gates in the Czech Republic: the Charles Bridge in Prague and the stone bridge in Stříbro. The Stříbro bridge, an exceptionally valuable Gothic-Renaissance monument from the mid-16th century, was declared a Czech cultural monument in 1958. It has been part of the Stříbro urban monument zone since 1992.

In 2011 the Czech National bank issued a 5,000 CZK commemorative gold coin as part of the Bridges in the Czech Republic series. The coin was designed by Zbyněk Fojtů.
