= Vincent Houška =

Czech-Austrian composer and musician (1766–1840)

Vincent Houška (German: Vinzenz Hauschka; 21 January 1766 – 1840) was a Czech-Austrian composer and musician who played mandolin and cello. He was good enough a musician that he was able to tour Europe and give concerts. He was a friend and associate with Ludwig van Beethoven.

== Life and career ==
Houška was born on 21 January 1766 in Mies, Bohemia (now Stříbro, Czech Republic). He was a son of the schoolmaster of Mies, and when eight years of age moved with his parents to Prague, where his father had been appointed to a school. Houška studied music in this city, and took up the mandolin as his first instrument. He also entered the cathedral as a chorister and later received systematic instruction from Josef Seeger and Ferdinand Laube, "the father of the violin virtuoso." Houška devoted himself to the cello and mandolin and made remarkable progress on both, and a few years afterwards continued the cello studies under Christ, one of the most celebrated Bohemian virtuosi.

At sixteen years of age he entered the orchestra of the Count of Thun and remained in his service till the death of the Count two years later, when the orchestra was disbanded. He then made a concert tour through Austria and Germany, visiting Karlsbad, Dresden and other important cities, where his performances on both instruments were highly spoken of. Towards the end of 1792 he took up his residence in Vienna, where his public performances attracted considerable notice. After he had resided in Vienna for several years, he gave up on music as a profession and accepted a position in the government. After this appointment his public appearances were rare, but he still took an active interest in the art. He was one of the founders of the Gesellschaft der Musikfreunde, Vienna, and also the Concert Spirituel. He continued to write for his instruments; but the majority of his compositions were not published, the principal manuscripts being nocturnes and quintets for mandolin, alto and violoncello, as well as concertos for cello, and church compositions.

Houška died in 1840 in Vienna.
