= Communion under both kinds =

In Christianity, reception of both the consecrated bread and wine of the Eucharist

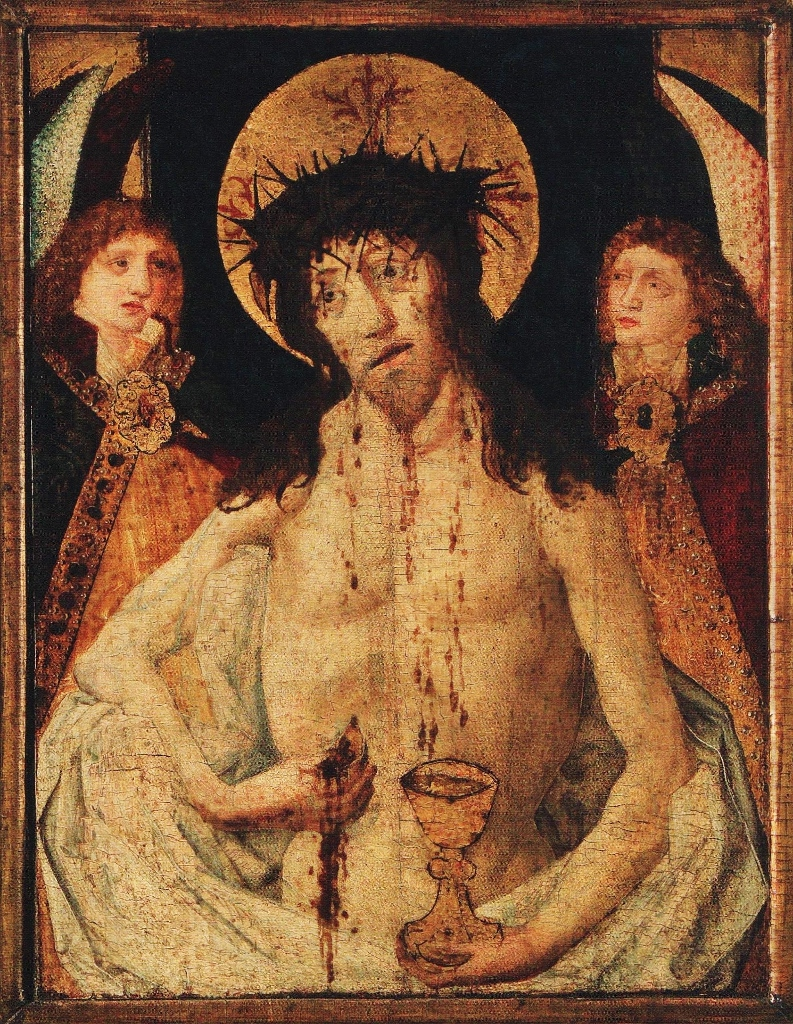
Man of Sorrows from Prague, c. 1470. Jesus Christ is taking out a host from his wound while his blood is flows into a chalice. The depiction of Christ, symbolically offering his body and blood, clearly demonstrates the practice of receiving the Communion under both kinds, which was crucial for the Bohemian Reformation of the 15th century.

Communion under both kinds is the reception under both "species" (i.e., both the consecrated bread and wine) of the Eucharist in the Roman Catholic church. Denominations of Christianity that hold to a doctrine of Communion under both kinds may believe that a Eucharist which does not include both bread and wine as elements of the religious ceremony is not valid, while others may consider the presence of both bread and wine as preferable, but not necessary, for the ceremony. In some traditions, the second element may be grape juice in place of wine containing alcohol.

== Catholicism ==
=== Doctrine ===
In reference to the Eucharist as a sacrifice, Communion under both kinds belongs at least to the integrity and essence, of the rite, and may not be omitted without violating the precept of Christ: "Do this in remembrance of me" (Luke 22:19). This is mentioned implicitly by the Council of Trent (Sess. XXI, c. i; XXII, c. i), and the Second Vatican Council emphasised that "the dogmatic principles which were laid down by the Council of Trent [remain] intact". The General Instruction of the Roman Missal states that the people "should share the cup when it is permitted. Then, Communion is a clearer sign of sharing in the sacrifice that is actually being celebrated."

=== Practice ===
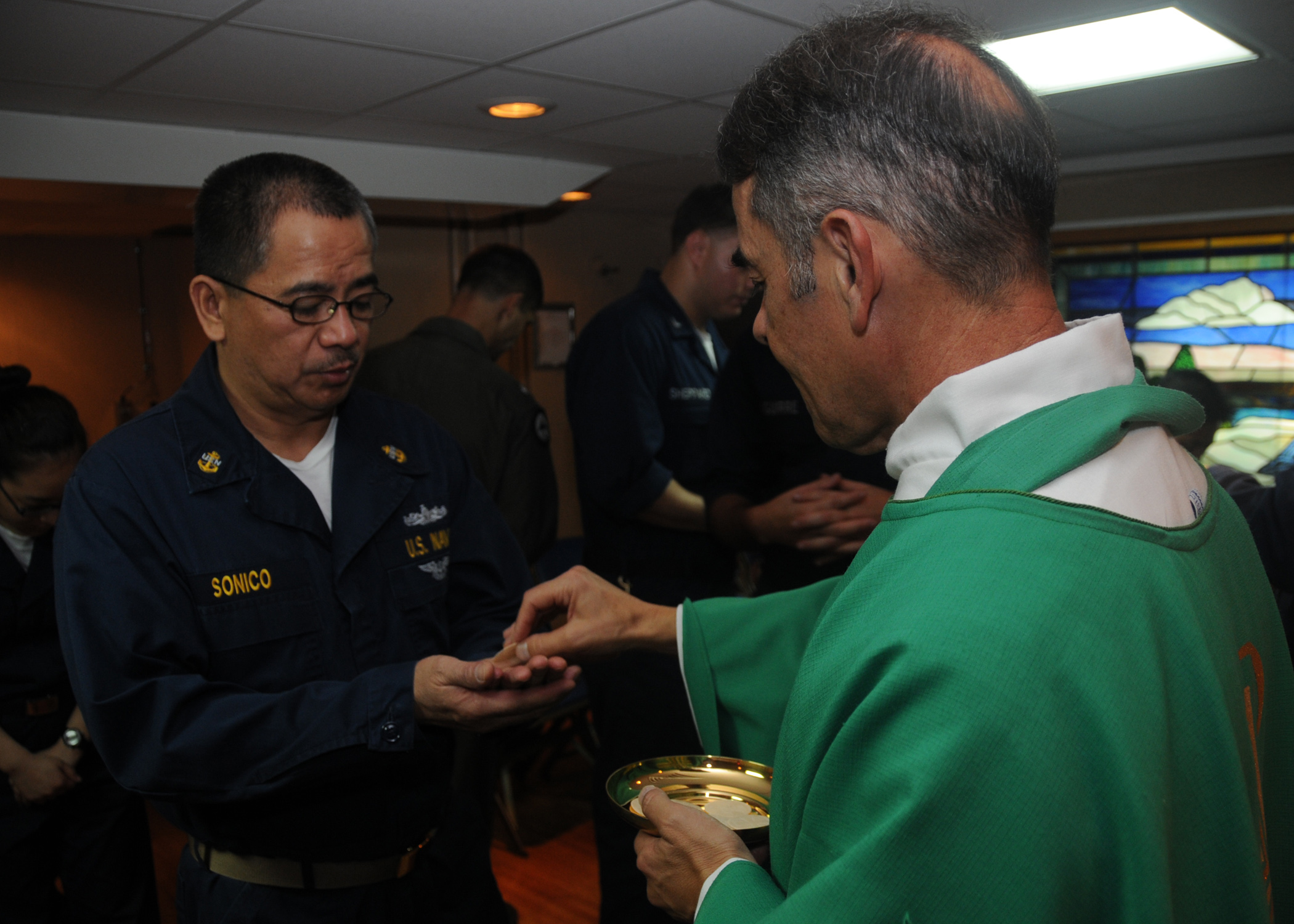
A sailor receives Communion from a Catholic chaplain aboard a US Navy ship.

Catholicism teaches that Christ is sacramentally (and equally) present under each species, and therefore if a person receives only one species, Christ is fully present and nothing is lacking.

In the early Church, Communion was ordinarily administered and received under both kinds. That such was the practice is mentioned by Paul in I Corinthians 11:28. But side by side in the Early Church there existed the custom of communicating in certain cases under one kind alone: for example, when people took home some of the Eucharist after Sunday worship and communicated during the week, or when the Eucharist was brought to the sick.

By the Middle Ages, the Church had become, like most of European society, increasingly hierarchical. There was much stress on being holy when receiving Communion, and a greatly heightened appreciation of the holiness of the sacramental elements (bread and wine). This meant that all who approached the altar were to be as pure as possible, and inevitably led to the exclusion of the laity from receiving the Eucharist under both kinds, reserving the practice to the clergy. It is difficult to say when the practice of offering the chalice to the people stopped, but it seems to have been part of the way in which Church authorities sought to prevent anything disrespectful happening to the Eucharist; it was also, by this time, that the host (the Communion bread) was given only on the tongue. It is generally thought by historians that the practice of offering Communion to the laity under one species alone began during the 12th or 13th century, and had become a common Church practice by the 14th century.

This practice was challenged by the Bohemian reformer, Jacob of Mies, who in 1414 began to offer Communion under both kinds to his congregation in the Church of St. Martin in the Wall. The matter was reviewed by the 13th Session of the Council of Constance, in 1415; the council rejected the grounds for offering the chalice to lay people and banned the practice. This became the most emblematic issue of the Hussite Wars, which resulted in the permission of communion under both kinds for Utraquists in Bohemia in 1433 (withdrawn in 1627 until the Patent of Toleration in 1781). In the 1500s, this was challenged again by the Protestant Reformers, including Martin Luther, John Calvin and Huldrych Zwingli. The Council of Trent referred to the pope to decide on the petition of the Holy Roman Emperor to allow the use of the chalice in his dominions; in 1564 Pius IV granted conditional permission to some German bishops, but this was withdrawn the following year. Communion under both kinds, by then, does not seem to have been well received among Catholic faithful, already being regarded as a 'Protestant' practice.

In the 20th century, Catholic liturgical reformers began to press for a return to Communion under both kinds, citing the practice of the Church before the 13th century. There were spirited debates over the issue at the Second Vatican Council, resulting in a compromise statement by the bishops: "communion under both kinds may be granted when the bishops think fit, not only to clerics and religious, but also to the laity, in cases to be determined by the Apostolic See, as for instance, to the newly ordained in the Mass of their sacred ordination, to the newly professed in the Mass of their religious profession, and to the newly baptized in the Mass which follows their baptism". Regular use of Communion under both kinds requires the permission of the bishop, but bishops in many countries have given blanket authorisation to administer Holy Communion in this way. In the United States, the Notre Dame Study of Catholic Parish Life showed that by 1989, slightly less than half of the parishes in its survey offered the chalice to their congregations.

== Eastern Orthodoxy ==
(Also applicable to the appropriate Eastern Catholic Churches.)

The Eastern Orthodox Church has consistently practised communion under both kinds. Both the clergy and the people normally receive in both kinds.

=== Doctrine ===
Communion of only the Eucharistic Bread is seen as imperfect by the Orthodox churches, who do not normally follow this practice, even in extremis.

== Lutheranism ==
A Lutheran priest administers the Eucharistic elements to the faithful during the celebration of the Holy Mass.

=== Doctrine ===
The Lutheran churches teach:

In our churches, communion is administered to the laity in both kinds, because this is a manifest command and precept of Christ. Matt. 26:27. 'Drink ye all of it.' In this passage Christ teaches, in the plainest terms, that they should all drink out of the cup. And in order that no one may be able to cavil at these words, and explain them as referring to the clergy alone, Paul informs us that the entire church at Corinth received the sacrament in both kinds. (1 Cor. 11:26.) And this custom was retained in the church for a long time, as can be proved by history, and the writings of the Fathers. Cyprian frequently mentions the fact that in his day the cup was given to the laity. St. Jerome also says, the priests, who administer the sacrament, dispense the blood of Christ to the people. And pope Gelasius himself commanded that the sacrament should not be divided (distinct. 2, de consecat. cap. comperimus). There is no canon extant, which commands that one kind alone should be received. Nor can it be ascertained when, or by whom, the custom of receiving bread alone was introduced, although cardinal Cusanus mentions the time when it was approved. Now it is evidence that such a custom, introduced contrary to the divine command, and also in opposition to the ancient canons, is wrong. It was therefore improper to coerce and oppress the conscience of those who wished to receive the sacrament agreeably to the appointment of Christ, and compel them to violate the institution of our Lord. And inasmuch by Christ, the custom of carrying about the host in the procession is omitted amongst us.

=== Practice ===
The Eucharist is administered by a Lutheran priest under both kinds, often at the chancel rails or in a communion line, after hosts and a common chalice are consecrated.

== Anglicanism and Methodism ==
=== Doctrine ===
The 30th article of the 39 articles of the Church of England, as well as Article XIX of the Methodist Articles of Religion states: "The Cup of the Lord is not to be denied to the Lay-people: for both the parts of the Lord's Sacrament, by Christ's ordinance and commandment, ought to be ministered to all Christian men alike."

=== Practice ===
In Anglican and Methodist liturgy, the bread (typically in wafer form) is administered by licensed clergy into the cupped hands of the communicant, usually kneeling at the altar rail. The chalice may be administered by the clergy or, in certain dioceses, by licensed laypersons. The bread may be consumed before drinking the wine from the chalice or may be dipped into the wine prior to consuming (intinction).

== Reformed ==
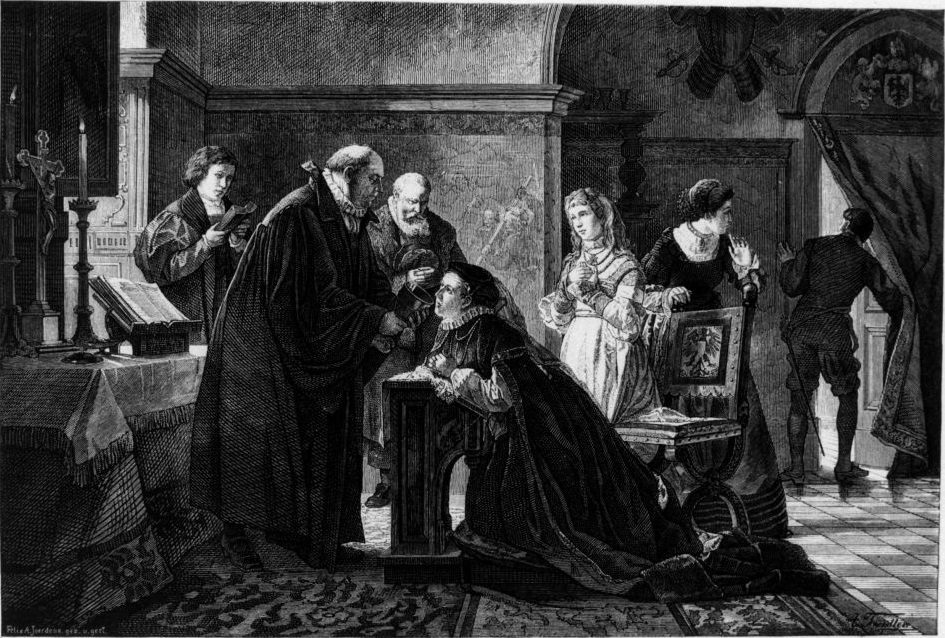
Elisabeth of Brandenburg secretly takes communion in both kinds.

=== Doctrine ===
Communion under both kinds for the whole congregation was a central issue for the Protestant reformers, since they believed that it had been specifically commanded by Jesus at the Last Supper. John Calvin in his seminal 1536 work, Institutes of the Christian Religion, wrote; 'For Christ not only gave the cup, but appointed that the apostles should do so in future. For his words contain the command, "Drink ye all of it." And Paul relates, that it was so done, and recommends it as a fixed institution (First Epistle to the Corinthians 1Corinthians 11:25)'.

=== Practice ===
Almost all Reformed churches practice communion under both kinds. One marked distinction in many Reformed churches is not using a chalice for the wine, but rather individual communion cups. In some churches wine is not used, but rather grape juice (see Alcohol in Christianity).

== Latter Day Saints ==
In the Latter Day Saint movement the sacrament of the Lord's Supper is taken under both kinds, similar to Protestant usage. As originally practiced by the Latter Day Saint movement founder Joseph Smith and other early Latter Day Saints, the sacrament included the use of fermented wine.

Based on a document that Latter Day Saints believe was a revelation to Joseph Smith, however, it has been acceptable for Latter Day Saints to use other substances in the sacrament. As stated in the document: "It mattereth not what ye shall eat or what ye shall drink when ye partake of the sacrament, if it so be that ye do it with an eye single to my glory—remembering unto the Father my body which was laid down for you, and my blood which was shed for the remission of your sins." As a result of this revelation and anti-alcohol sentiment, the common practice of the Church of Jesus Christ of Latter-day Saints since the early 20th century has been to use bread and water and not to involve wine or grape juice. The second largest church to emerge from the early Latter Day Saint movement, the Community of Christ (formerly the Reorganized Church of Jesus Christ of Latter Day Saints), generally uses unfermented grape juice and whole wheat bread.

== See also ==
- Lovefeast
