= Gliwice Castle =

Coordinates: 50°17′34″N 18°39′57″E

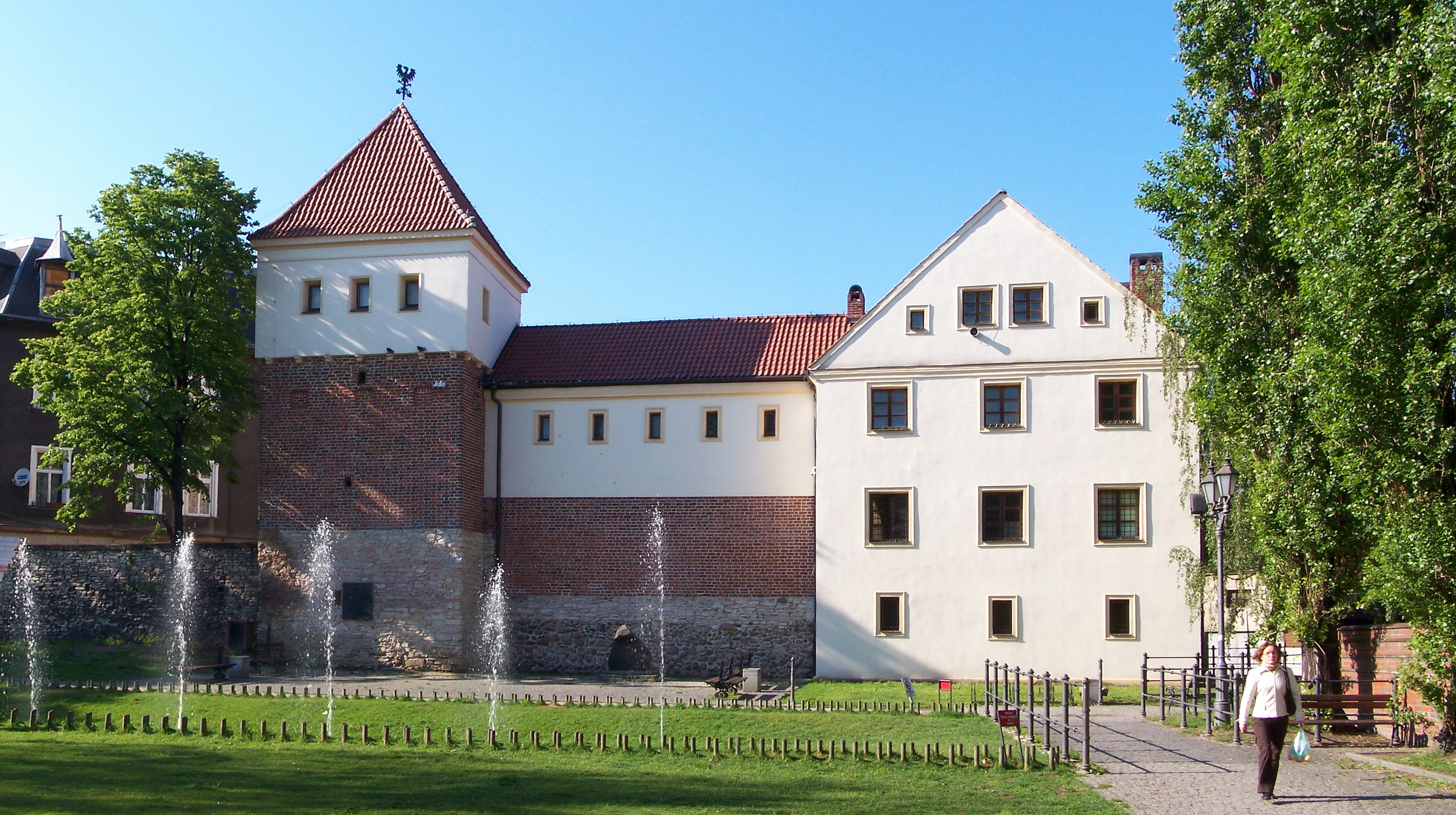
The Piasts' Castle in Gliwice

The so-called Piasts' Castle in Gliwice, southern Poland, dates back to the mid-14th century. It consists of a tower from 1322, which was originally part of the city walls, and an adjoining building which was probably an armory. Modifications were carried out in the 15th century, between 1558 and 1561 it became the residence of Friedrich von Zettritz. Later it was an armory, a jail, a magazine and since 1945 a museum. Between 1956 and 1959 it was thoroughly rebuilt and partially reconstructed. Since that time it is claimed to be a Piast castle, although no sourced evidence backs this claim. Since 1959 the castle has been part of the Gliwice Museum.

== See also ==
- Castles in Poland
