= Těchlovice (Hradec Králové District) =

- Municipality
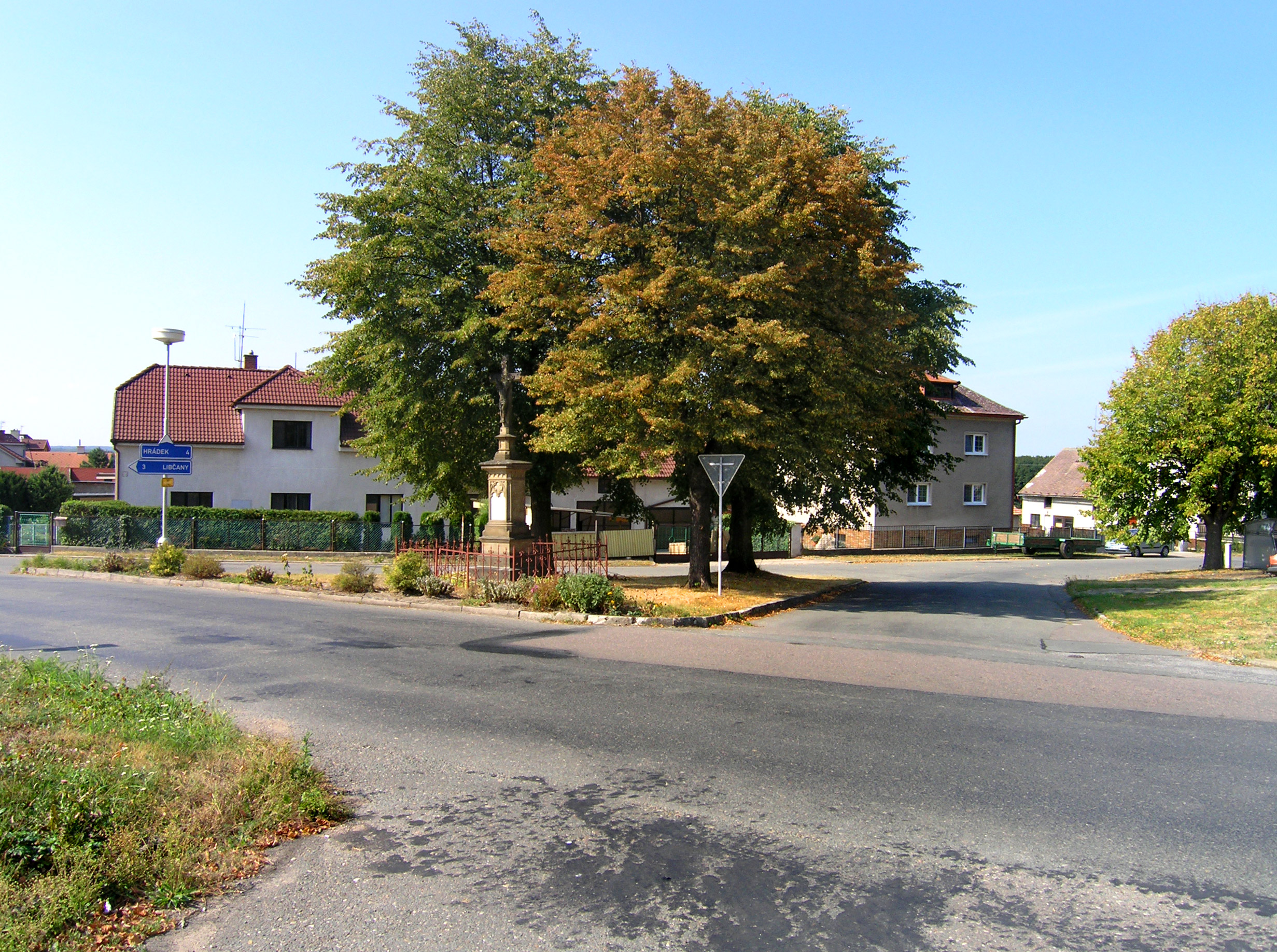
- Centre of Těchlovice

- Flag Coat of arms

- Location in the Czech Republic
- Coordinates: 50°12′27″N 15°42′40″E
- Country: Czech Republic
- Region: Hradec Králové
- District: Hradec Králové
- First mentioned: 1318

Area
  - Total: 3.30 km^{2} (1.27 sq mi)
- Elevation: 245 m (804 ft)

Population (2026-01-01)
  - Total: 372
  - Density: 113/km^{2} (292/sq mi)
- Time zone: UTC+1 (CET)
  - Summer (DST): UTC+2 (CEST)
- Postal code: 503 27
- Website: www.obectechlovice.cz

Těchlovice is a municipality and village in Hradec Králové District in the Hradec Králové Region of the Czech Republic. It has about 400 inhabitants.

== Demographics ==
Historical population
Year	Pop.	±%
1869	561	—
1880	569	+1.4%
1890	548	−3.7%
1900	509	−7.1%
1910	505	−0.8%
1921	527	+4.4%
1930	505	−4.2%
1950	361	−28.5%
1961	368	+1.9%
1970	364	−1.1%
1980	333	−8.5%
1991	312	−6.3%
2001	311	−0.3%
2011	341	+9.6%
2021	363	+6.5%
Source: Censuses
