= Stříbro =

- Town
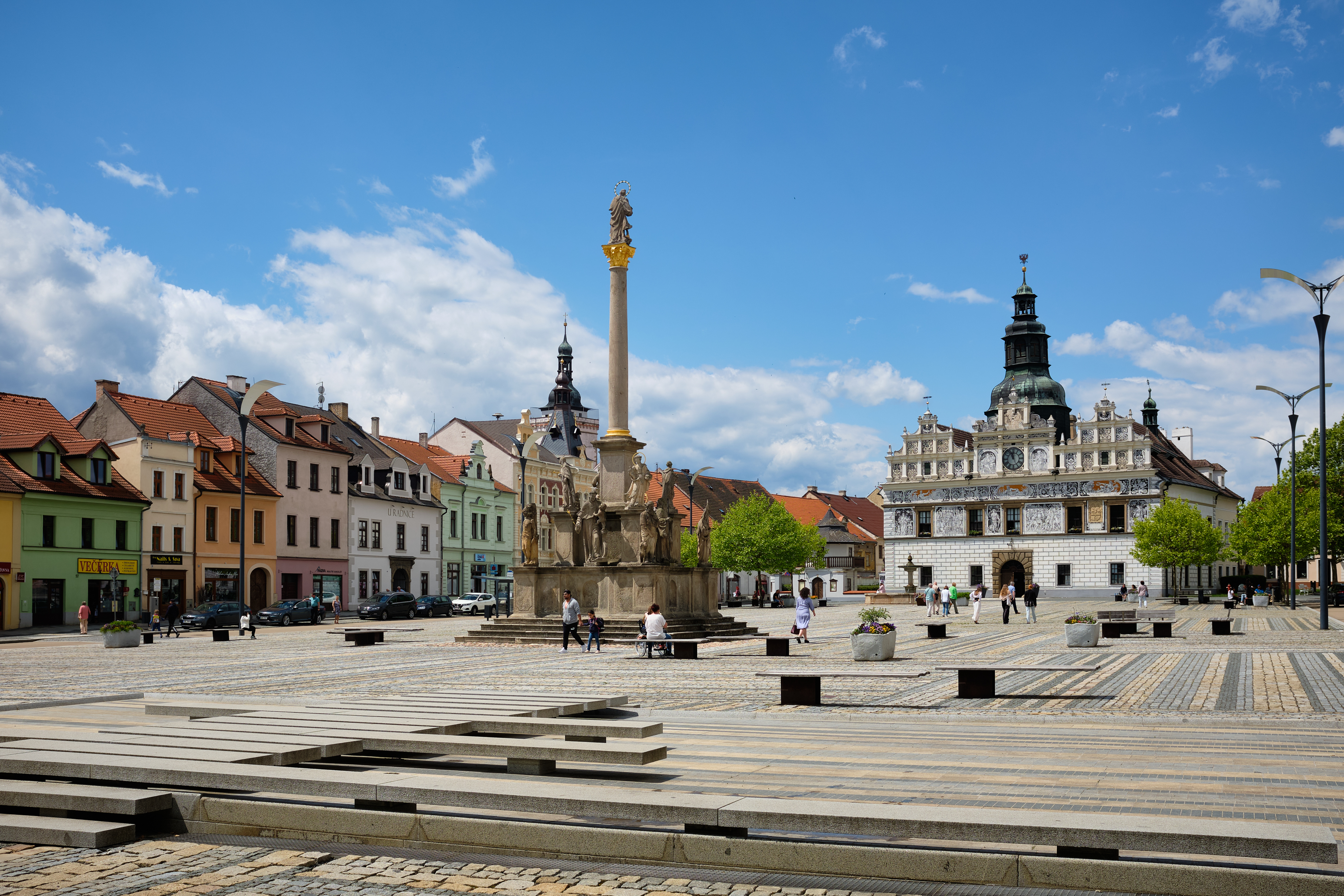
- The square Masarykovo náměstí

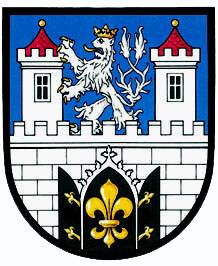
- Flag Coat of arms

- Location in the Czech Republic
- Coordinates: 49°45′11″N 13°0′15″E
- Country: Czech Republic
- Region: Plzeň
- District: Tachov
- First mentioned: 1183

Government
  - Mayor: Martin Záhoř (ANO)

Area
  - Total: 47.78 km^{2} (18.45 sq mi)
- Elevation: 399 m (1,309 ft)

Population (2026-01-01)
  - Total: 8,218
  - Density: 172.0/km^{2} (445.5/sq mi)
- Time zone: UTC+1 (CET)
  - Summer (DST): UTC+2 (CEST)
- Postal code: 349 01
- Website: www.mustribro.cz

Stříbro (Czech pronunciation: [ˈstr̝̊iːbro]; German: Mies) is a town in Tachov District in the Plzeň Region of the Czech Republic. It has about 8,200 inhabitants. The town is located in the Plasy Uplands on the Mže River and is a railway junction.

Stříbro was founded in the 12th century as a mining settlement, associated with silver and later lead mining. The historic town centre with the Gothic-Renaissance Stříbro bridge is well preserved and is protected as an urban monument zone.

== Administrative division ==
Stříbro consists of seven municipal parts (in brackets population according to the 2021 census):

- Stříbro (7,134)
- Butov (13)
- Jezerce (30)
- Lhota u Stříbra (89)
- Milíkov (80)
- Otročín (37)
- Těchlovice (136)

== Etymology ==
The Czech name Stříbro literally means 'silver' and refers to its mining here. The German name Mies comes from the name of the Mže river.

== Geography ==
Stříbro is located about 27 kilometres (17 mi) east of Tachov and 26 km (16 mi) west of Plzeň. It lies in the hilly landscape of the Plasy Uplands. The highest point is the hill Jirná at 523 m (1,716 ft) above sea level. The Mže River flows through the town. The confluence of the Mže and Úhlavka rivers is located on the southern outskirts of the town. A part of the Hracholusky Reservoir, built on the Mže, lies in the eastern part of the municipal territory.

== History ==
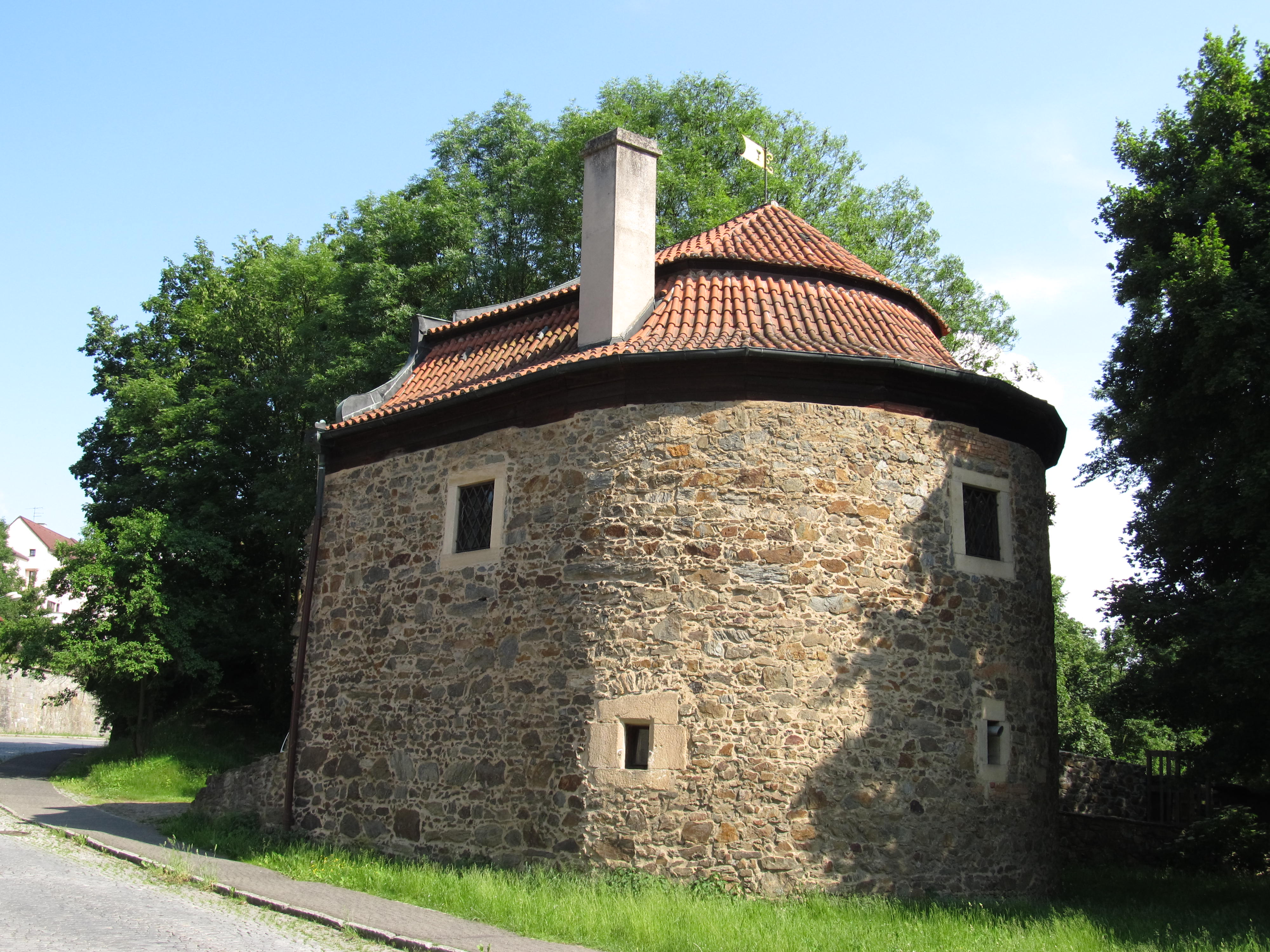
Hussite bastion

According to the 16th century chronicler Wenceslaus Hajek, the mining settlement in the Duchy of Bohemia was founded by the Přemyslid duke Soběslav I in 1131. The first written mention of Stříbro is in a deed of Duke Frederick from 1183. It was a mining settlement located on an important trade route (Zlatá cesta, "Golden Road") from Prague to Nuremberg. Silver and later mainly lead were mined here, which accelerated the growth of the settlement.

Between 1240 and 1250, the foundations of the new royal town were laid on a rocky promontory above the old settlement. Stříbro received town privileges in 1263.

During the Hussite Wars, the town was besieged by the troops of Jan Žižka in 1421, though it was not occupied until 1426. Shortly afterwards, the Hussite forces under Prokop the Great could repel an attack by the Crusaders in the Battle of Tachov. In 1541 the citizens turned Protestant. Silver mining was resumed under the King Ferdinand I in 1554. Upon the Battle of White Mountain, the town was subdued to the measures of the Counter-Reformation.

Until 1918, the town was part of Austria-Hungary. From 1918, Stříbro belonged to Czechoslovakia. After World War II, the remaining German-speaking population was expelled.

== Demographics ==
Historical population

Year	Pop.	±%
1869	5,135	—
1880	5,547	+8.0%
1890	5,303	−4.4%
1900	5,242	−1.2%
1910	5,907	+12.7%

Year	Pop.	±%
1921	6,167	+4.4%
1930	6,523	+5.8%
1950	5,280	−19.1%
1961	5,543	+5.0%
1970	6,453	+16.4%

Year	Pop.	±%
1980	6,801	+5.4%
1991	7,718	+13.5%
2001	7,745	+0.3%
2011	7,926	+2.3%
2021	7,519	−5.1%

Source: Censuses

== Transport ==
The D5 motorway (part of the European route E50) from Plzeň to the Czech–German border in Rozvadov runs south of the town, outside the municipal territory.

Stříbro is a railway junction. The town lies on the interregional lines Prague–Cheb, Plzeň–Karlovy Vary and Františkovy Lázně–Bohumín.

== Sights ==
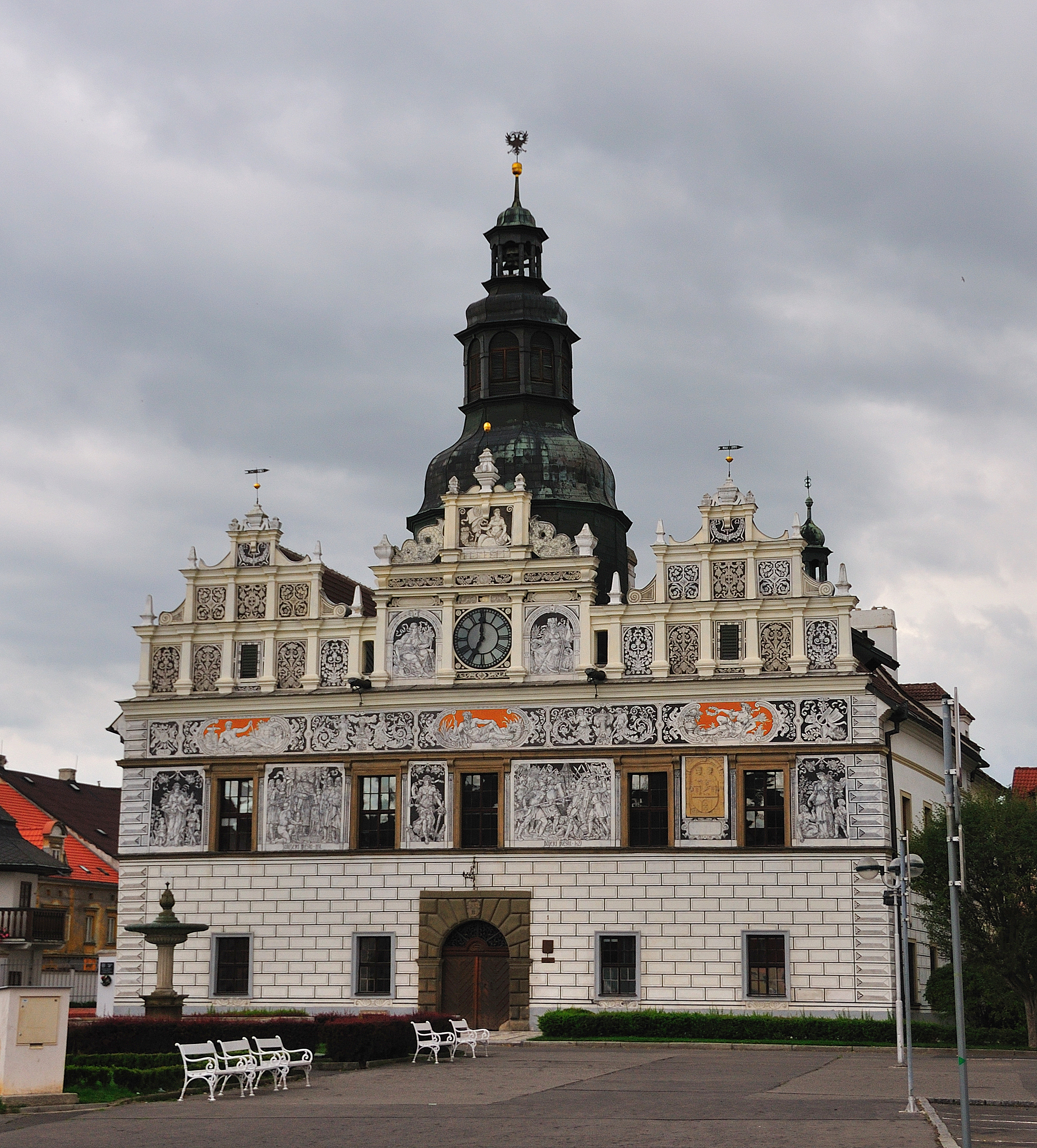
Town hall

Among the most valuable monuments is the Gothic-Renaissance Stříbro bridge. It has one preserved gate, built in 1555–1560.

The original town hall building, whose appearance has not been preserved, was replaced in 1543 by the current Renaissance building. The sgraffito decoration dates from the period 1823–1888.

The Church of All Saints was originally a sanctuary, which disappeared in a late Gothic reconstruction from 1565. The other parts date from 1754–1757, when the building was remodeled in the Baroque style. The church tower serves as lookout tower open to the public.

There are still preserved fragments of town walls, which surrounded the old town in a large circle. They include the so-called Jewish Gate, which made it possible to enter the Jewish quarter.

The mining open-air museum with an outdoor exhibition of mining equipment shows the mining tradition in Stříbro and in whole country.

== Notable people ==
- Jacob of Mies (1372–1429), reformer
- Vincent Houška (1766–1840), composer and musician
- Anton Depauly (1801–1866), painter
- Leopold Schmutzler (1864–1940), German painter
- Ernst Streeruwitz (1874–1952), Austrian military officer, businessman and politician

== Twin towns – sister cities ==
Stříbro is twinned with:

- Fano, Italy
- Moncoutant, France
- Oelsnitz, Germany
- Vohenstrauß, Germany

== Gallery ==
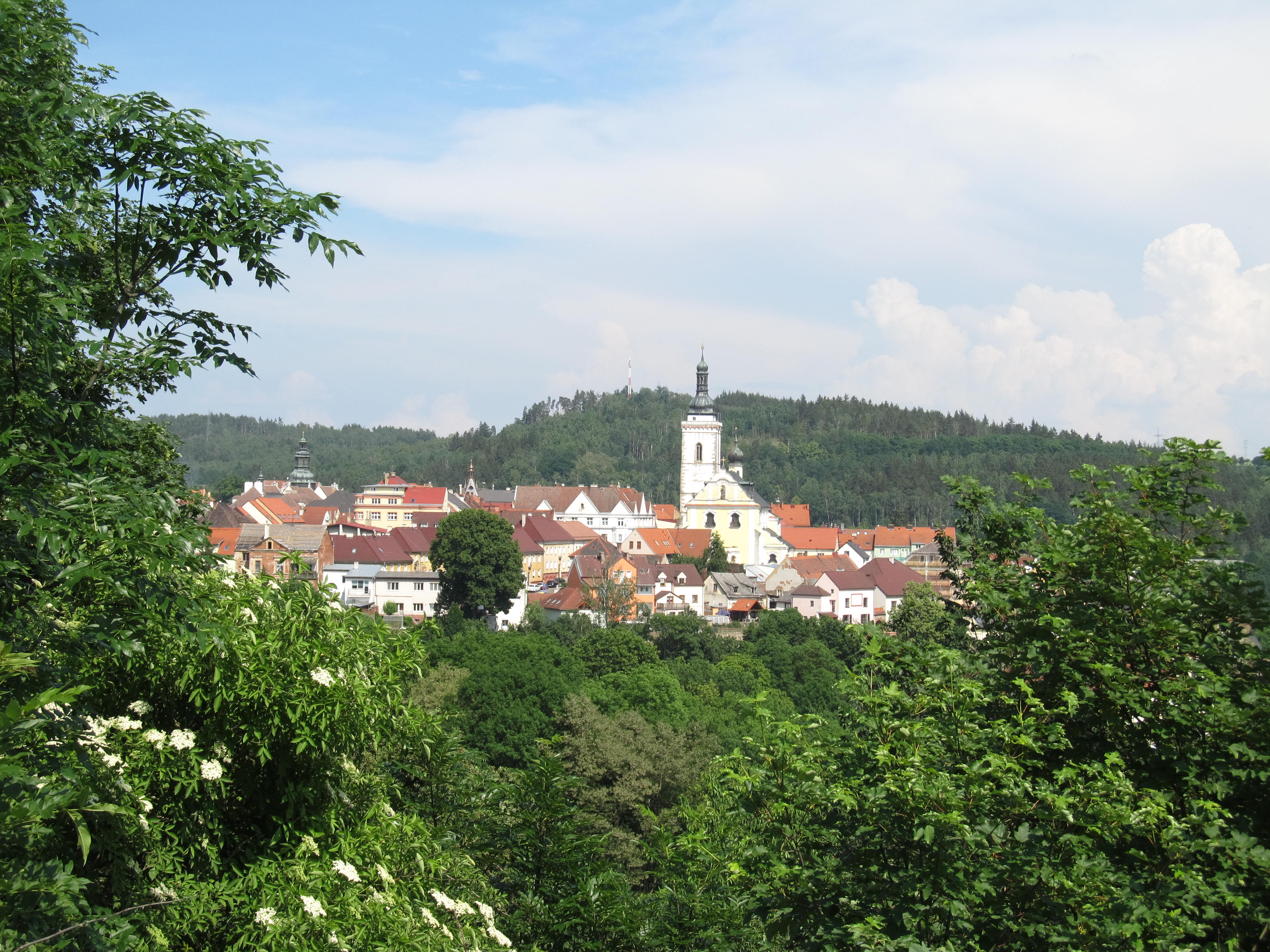
Panorama of the town centre

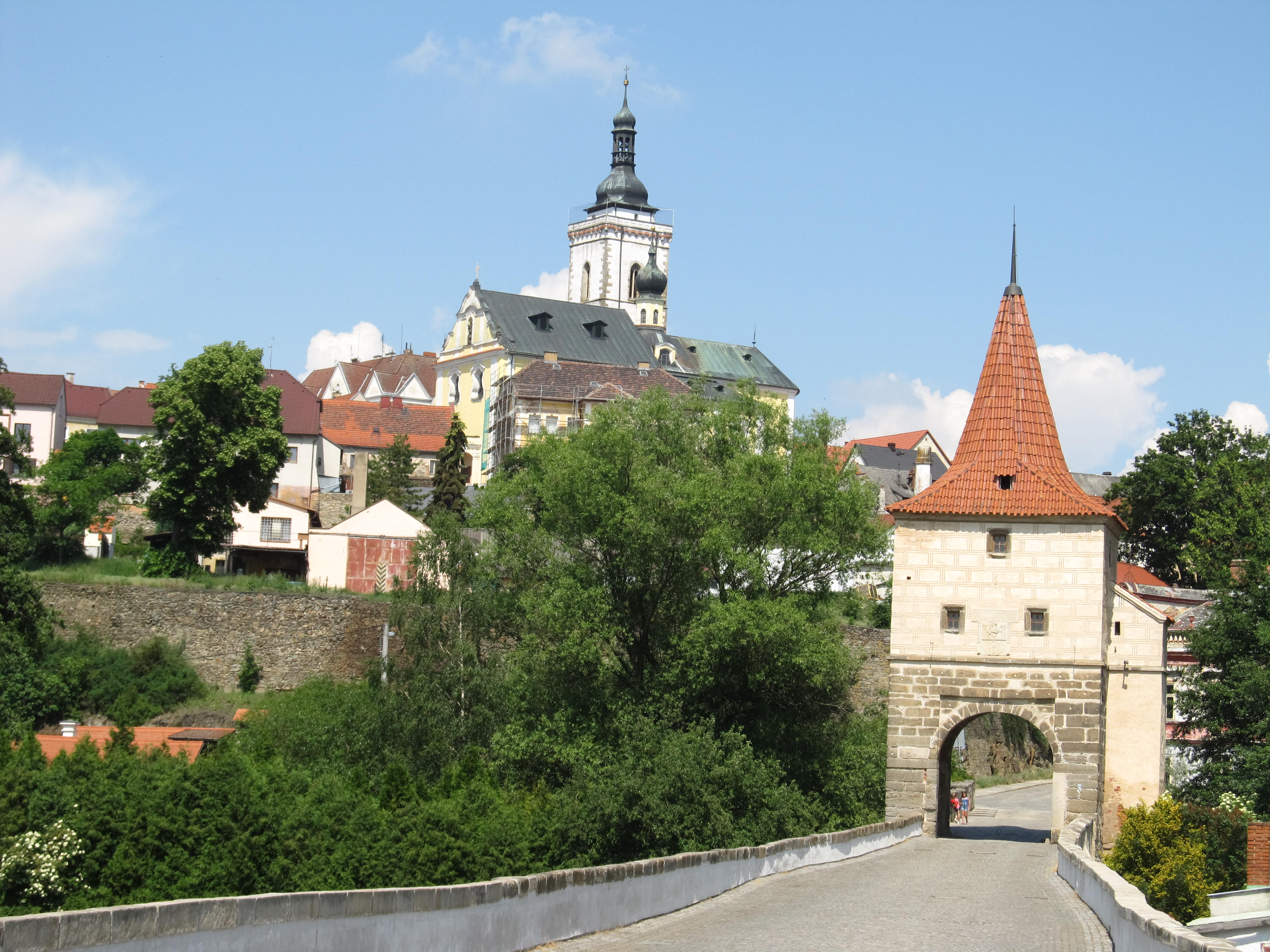
Stříbro bridge with the town gate

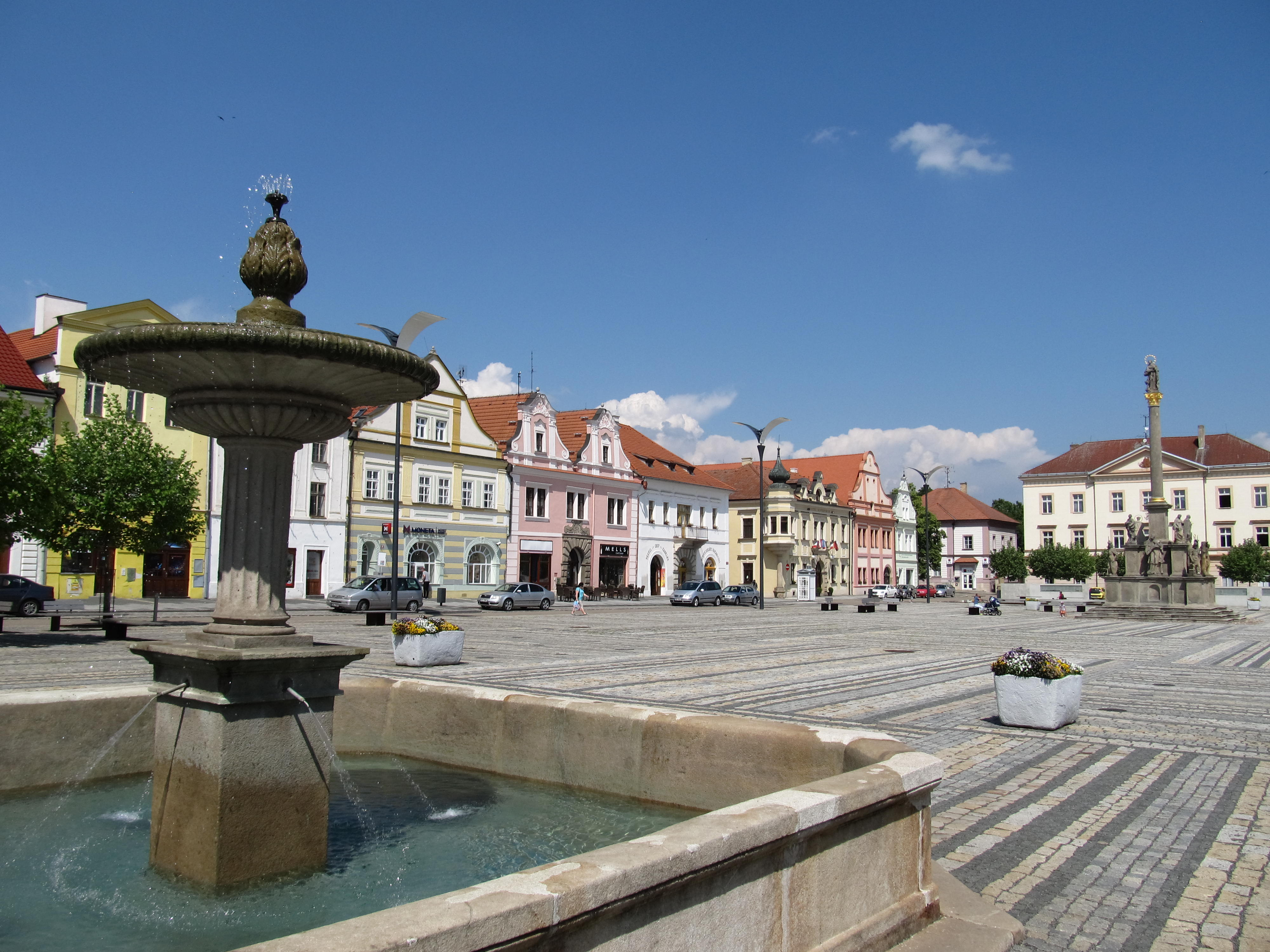
Masarykovo náměstí with a fountain and Marian column

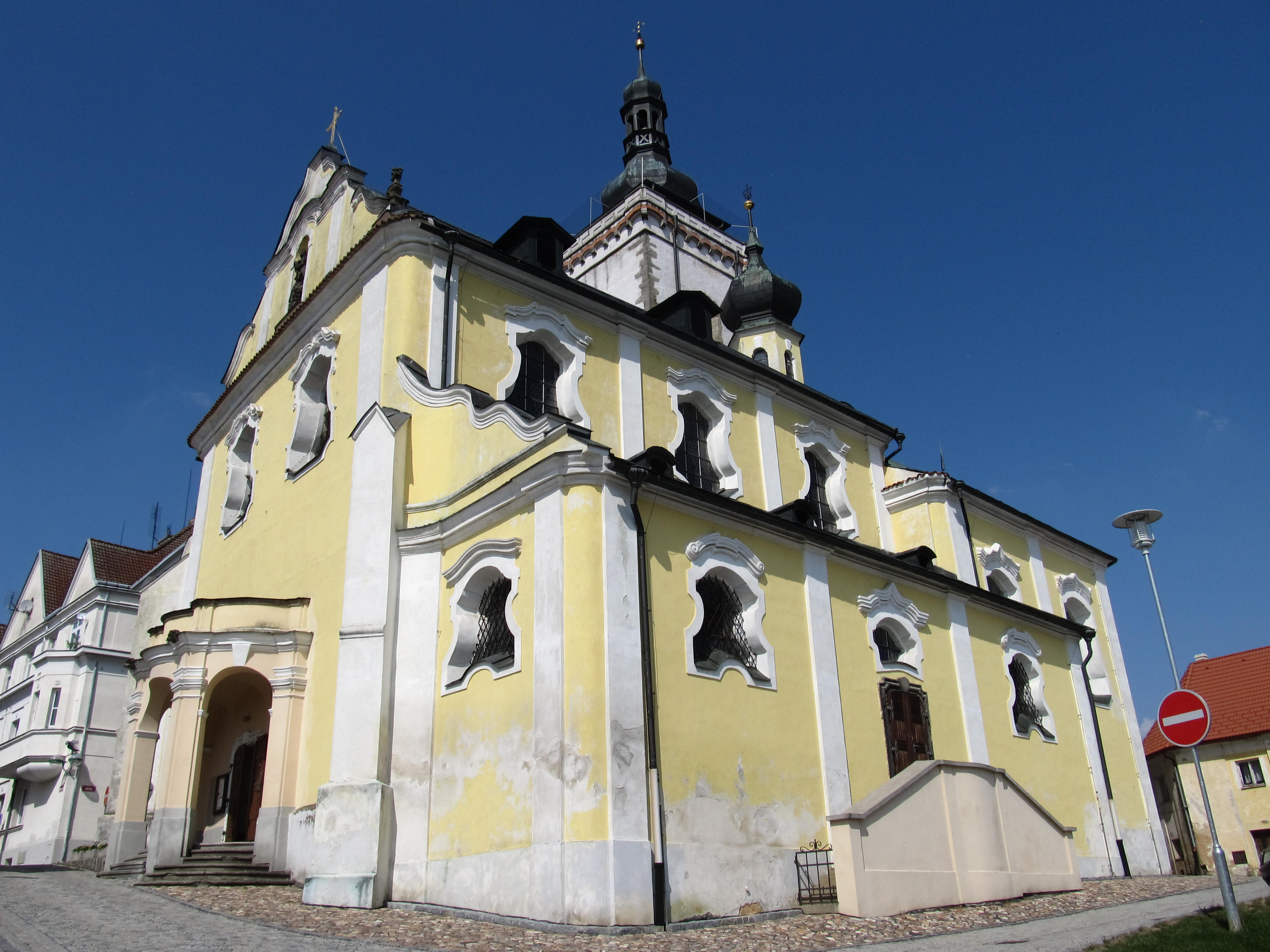
Church of All Saints

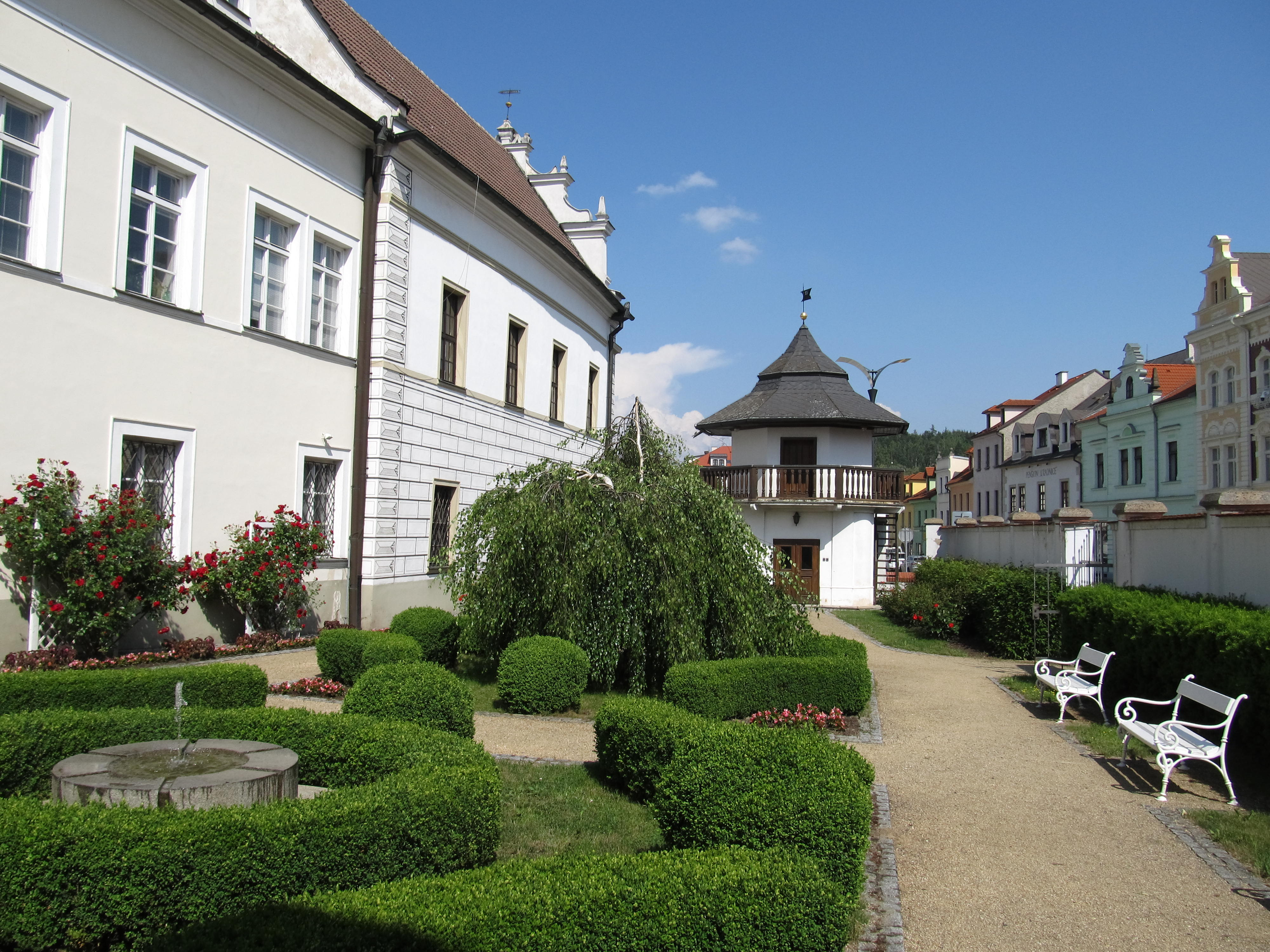
Town hall garden

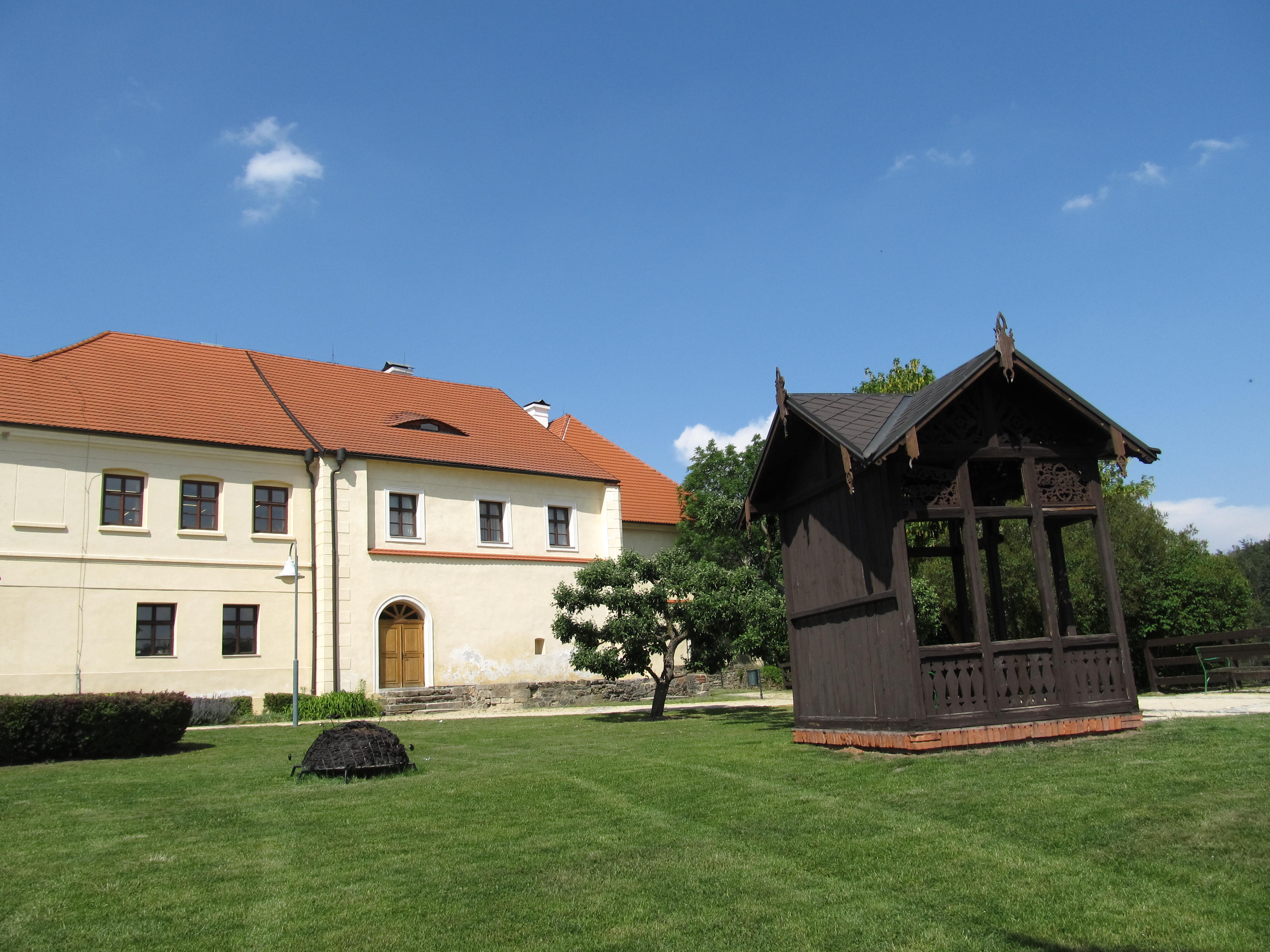
Garden of the Franciscan monastery
