= Compacts of Basel =

15th century religious agreement

The Compacts of Basel, also known as Basel Compacts or Compactata, was an agreement between the Council of Basel and the moderate Hussites (or Utraquists), which was ratified by the Estates of Bohemia and Moravia in Jihlava on 5 July 1436. The agreement authorized Hussite priests to administer the sacramental wine to laymen during the Eucharist. The Council of Basel ratified the document on 15 January 1437, but it acknowledged that the communion under both kinds was not heretical only on 23 December.

== Sources ==
- Janišová, Jana; Janiš, Dalibor (2016). "King, estates and the Czech Crown: the legal sources of the ideas of freedom in the medieval and early modern Czech lands; The Czech sources". In Rau, Zbigniew; Żurawski vel Grajewski, Przemysław; Tracz-Tryniecki, Marek (eds.). Magna Carta: A Central European perspective of our common heritage of freedom. Routledge. ISBN 978-1-138-84852-8.
- Sedlar, Jean W. (1994). East Central Europe in the Middle Ages, 1000–1500. University of Washington Press. ISBN 0-295-97290-4.
- Šmahel, František (2011). "The Hussite Revolution (1419–1471)". In Pánek, Jaroslav; Tůma, Oldřich (eds.). A History of the Czech Lands. Charles University in Prague. pp. 149–169. ISBN 978-80-246-1645-2.
- Stieber, Joachim W. (1978). Pope Eugenius IV, the Council of Basel and the Secular and Ecclesiastical Authorities in the Empire: The Conflict Over Supreme Authority and Power in the Church. BRILL. ISBN 90-04-05240-2.
