= Fanfrnoch =

The Fanfrnoch (also famfrnoch, bukač, bukál or brumbál) is a Czech percussion musical instrument, originally from the Chod region. It is classified as a membranophone.

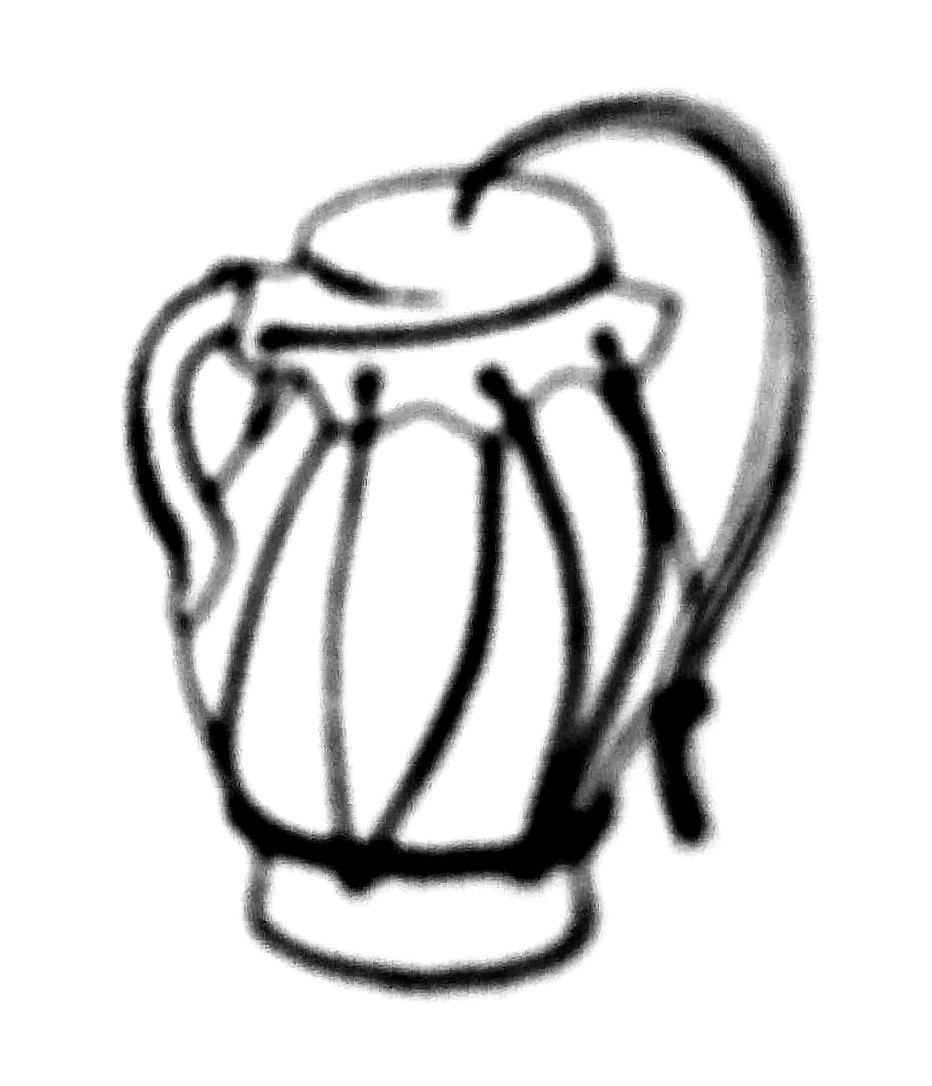
Fanfrnoch

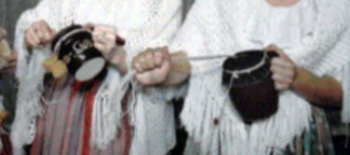
Playing the fanfrnoch

The instrument is a clay or metal container (often a pitcher) which is covered with a stretched bladder held in place with stitching, and with a bundle of horsehair passing through the middle of the bladder. The larger the pitcher, the deeper the instrument's sound. The instrument is played by pulling the horsehair, and tones may be sounded by rubbing the hair with moistened fingers. It served as an accompaniment to Czech folk songs, and one popular new year's tune is named after the instrument.
