= Jacob of Mies =

Jacob of Mies (Czech: Jakoubek ze Stříbra, Latin: Jacobellus de Misa; 1372 – 9 August 1429) was a Czech reformer from the Kingdom of Bohemia and colleague of Jan Hus.

== Life ==
Jacob was born in 1372 in Stříbro (called Mies in German and Misa in Latin) near Plzeň in Bohemia (present-day Czech Republic). He studied at the University of Prague, receiving both bachelor's and the master's degrees in theology, and became pastor of the Church of St. Michael and an outspoken supporter of Jan Hus.

In 1410 he took part in the disputations regarding John Wycliffe, defending the latter against archiepiscopal condemnation. Where Wycliffe saw ecclesiastical property ownership as a capitulation to the anti-Christ, Jacob saw the restriction of the communion cup. His study of Scripture and the Fathers led him to believe that withholding of the chalice in the administration of Holy Communion to the laity was an arbitrary measure of the Catholic Church.

Jacob taught that communion under both kinds was necessary for salvation, or at least an obligation, and that as a precept of Christ it could not be changed by the church. Only those who received the utraquist (both kinds) communion belong to the church of Christ.

In 1414, he propounded and defended his views in a public disputation; and when Hus, at that time attending the Council of Constance in Konstanz before his arrest, accepted them to some degree, Jacob began to administer the chalice to his parishioners, in spite of the remonstrances of the bishop and the university. His example was quickly followed by other pastors in Prague.

The Fathers of the Council of Constance (1415) issued a decree, explaining that reception of Holy Communion under both kinds was not necessary for salvation, though such reception in and of itself was not evil. What was at stake was not the inherent good or evil of the practice, but the practical implications such as irreverence toward, and misunderstandings about, Holy Communion and the authority of the church to develop or adjust sacramental practice.

Though Jacob would by no means submit, he was not removed from his office, perhaps because in other points, as, for instance, in the doctrine of purgatory, he agreed with the Catholic Church. During the last decade of his life Jacob was regarded as one of the foremost of the Utraquist theologians. He died in Prague on 9 August 1429.
