= Nicholas V of Krnov =

Duke of Krnov

Nicholas V, Duke of Krnov
- Coat-of-arms of Racibórz (Ratibor)
- Born: c. early 15th century
- Died: 1452
- Noble family: Přemyslid dynasty
- Spouses: Margaret Clemm of Ellguth; Barbara Rockemberg
- Issue: John IV, Duke of Krnov; Wenceslaus III, Duke of Rybnik; Barbara of Karniów
- Father: John II, Duke of Opava-Ratibor
- Mother: Helena of Lithuania

Nicholas V, Duke of Krnov (also known as Nicholas II of Opava-Ratibor; Czech: Mikuláš V. Krnovský; c. early 15th century – 1452) was a member of the Přemyslid dynasty. He was Duke of Racibórz, Krnov, Bruntál and Rybnik. All these duchies were situated in Silesia, then part of the Crown of Bohemia.

Nicholas was the elder son of John "the Iron" and Helena of Lithuania (a niece of King Władysław II Jagiełło of Poland). His exact date of birth is unknown, but historians place it in the early 15th century.

Nicholas and his younger brother Wenceslaus II were minors when their father died in 1424. Their mother, Helena of Lithuania, acted as regent until 1428. Until 1449, she styled herself Lady of Pszczyna, suggesting that she had received Pless as her jointure. Nicholas V and Wenceslaus II ruled their duchy jointly until 15 October 1437, when they divided their inheritance. Nicholas V received Krnov, Bruntál, Rybnik, Wodzisław Śląski, and Baborów, while Wenceslaus II received Racibórz, Żytna, and Pilchowice. Nicholas inherited Pszczyna after his mother's death.

In 1433, a Hussite army passing through the Váh valley devastated Racibórz and prepared to hand it over to Duke Bolko V of Opole, who supported the Hussites. Nicholas V, however, reconquered Racibórz. In 1436, he also captured the Duchy of Głubczyce, which was then controlled by Duke Wenceslaus II of Opava. Wenceslaus retaliated by seizing Żory. In 1437, Nicholas V and Wenceslaus II reached a compromise.

In 1443, Nicholas allied himself with Dukes William of Opava, Przemyslaus II of Cieszyn, and Henry IX of Żagań-Głogów against the robber barons who infested Silesia.

Nicholas V died in 1452. His sons, John IV and Wenceslaus III, initially ruled jointly. In 1464, they divided their inheritance, with John IV receiving Krnov and Wodzisław Śląski, and Wenceslaus III receiving Rybnik, Pless, and Żory.

== Marriage and issue ==
In 1435, Nicholas V married Margaret Clemm of Ellguth. They had three children:

- John IV "the Elder" (d. 1483).
- Wenceslaus III (d. 1479).
- Barbara (d. 1510), married in 1475 to Duke Jan IV of Oświęcim (d. 1495/1497).

In 1451 in Kraków, Nicholas V married his second wife. She was Barbara Rockemberg (d. 1464) from a patrician family in Kraków. They had two children:

- Nicholas (died in infancy).
- Machna (d. 1508), married in 1482 to Duke Casimir II of Zator.

Since her stepsons John IV and Wenceslaus II were minors when Nicholas V died in 1452, Barbara was regent of Racibórz, Krnov, Bruntál and Rybnik from 1452 until 1462. She was also Lady of Pless, which was probably her jointure.
