= Barbara Rockemberg =

Barbara Rockemberg (d. aft. 12 November 1463), also known as Barbara Orientowa, was a Polish bourgeois woman who in her third marriage became Duchess of Racibórz, Krnov, Bruntál and Rybnik during 1451-1452 and Sovereign ruler over Pszczyna during 1452-1462.

== Life ==
=== Family ===
Barbara was a member of the Kraków patrician family of Rokenberg, whose name was derived from the town of Rockenberg in Upper Hesse) and was variously recorded as Rokenberg, Rockenberg, Rokembarg, Rokembark, Rokemberk and Rokemborg, and in the Polish female form of Rokemborgowa. The name of her parents are unknown, although it is probable that her mother was related to the Weinrichów family. Barbara's brothers Kaspar and Hieronim are both scholastic rectors of the University of Kraków.

=== Marriages and Issue ===
Her first husband was the juror and councilor Wilhelm Willandt, who appeared in Kraków documents during the years 1417-1436.

After the death of her first husband, Barbara married secondly with the merchant Jerzy Orient, from Silesian background, who appeared in documents during 1427-1445 and was a widower of certain Katharina. From this short-lived second union, Barbara had one known daughter, Anna Orientówna, who married firstly the citizen Jan Stancz and secondly with the noblemen from Bronocice Jakub Obulc (Obulcz), member of the Odrowąż family and cupbearer of Kraków. Barbara's second husband died between September 1445 and May 1448.

Prior to 10 March 1451, Barbara contracted her third marriage with Nicholas V, Duke of Racibórz, Krnov, Bruntál and Rybnik, who belonged to an illegitimate branch of the Přemyslid dynasty. For the Duke, this was his second marriage with a woman from the local middle-class (his first wife was Margaret Clemm of Ellguth, also from bourgeois origins). The Přemyslid Dukes of Racibórz mainly married with members from the Czech and Polish nobility; presumably, the reason of Nicholas V for this wedding was the wealth who Barbara inherited from her two previous husbands, who could improve his Ducal treasury. This union, who lasted almost two years, produced two children in quick succession: a son, Nicholas (who died in infancy and was buried at Wawel Cathedral) and a daughter, Margareta (also known as Machna), wife of Duke Casimir II of Zator.

=== Rule over Pszczyna ===
After the death of the third husband, about 22 December 1452, Barbara took possession of the district of Pszczyna as her dower. She was the second Dowager Duchess who take direct control over that land, the first one was her mother-in-law Helena of Lithuania, who ruled Pszczyna during 1424-1449/50. During her government, Duchess Helena confirmed a document dated from 1407 who guaranteed the conformation of the entire castellany of Pszczyna (including the towns of Mikołów and Bieruń with their surrounding villages).

As a ruler of Pszczyna, in 1454 Barbara hosted in her town the Polish Queen Elizabeth of Austria. In the same year, her brother-in-law Wenceslaus II attempted to take by force her domains, and send troops to Pszczyna; however, his early death in 1456 allowed Barbara not only to regain the full control over her lands but also obtained the regency of the Duchy on behalf of her stepsons.

In 1457 Barbara concluded an agreement with the Polish King Casimir IV, concerning with reciprocal help against armed robberies in their lands. In 1458 almost all the district of Pszczyna was burned.

In 1462 Barbara was expelled from her domains by her stepson John IV, who with the help of knights disguised as women entered and captured the main city of Pszczyna, forcing the Duchess to escape, leaving behind her brother Hieronim, who was arrested. The quickly capture of the district was facilitated by the fact that although Barbara had the land, the local fortress was in possession of John IV.

The last mention of Barbara as a living person was in Kraków documents from 12 November 1463. In 1464 her stepsons made the division of their domains between them, including Pszczyna.

In the 19th century was found a document dated on 18 February 1462 in Kraków, where was preserved the personal seal of Barbara, impressed in red wax. Divided in four shields with the traditional Piast eagles, was partially obscured in the border but visible the motto of the Duchess: sigillum barbara ducissa rath....
