= Nicholas III of Opava =

Nicholas III, Duke of Opava
- Born: c. 1343/50
- Died: 9 July 1394
- Noble family: Přemyslid dynasty
- Father: Nicholas II, Duke of Opava
- Mother: Hedwig of Oleśnica

Nicholas III of Opava (German: Nikolaus III. von Troppau; Czech: Mikuláš III. Opavský; c. 1339 – 9 July 1394) was Duke of Opava from 1367 to 1377 and Duke of Głubczyce from 1377 until his death.

== Life ==
Nicholas II of Opava was a member of the Opava branch of the Přemyslid dynasty. His parents were Duke Nicholas II of Opava and his second wife, Hedwig (died 1359), a daughter of Duke Konrad I of Oleśnica.

After their father's death in 1365, Nicholas III and his three brothers initially ruled their inheritance jointly. In 1367, however, the inheritance was divided: the oldest brother, John I, received the Duchy of Racibórz, while the three younger brothers, Nicholas III, Wenceslaus I and Przemko I continued to jointly rule the Duchy of Opava. In 1377, Opava was split, with Nicholas III and Wenceslaus I jointly ruling the newly split off Duchy of Głubczyce and Přemek I ruling what remained of the Duchy of Opava.

As Nicholas III was continually in financial difficulties, he had to mortgage the districts of Głubczyce, Zlate Hory, Hlučín and Krzanowice to his uncle Conrad II of Oels.

Nicholas III died unmarried and childless in 1394. His youngest brother Přemysl I continued to rule the Duchy of Głubczyce. He succeeded in redeeming the district of Głubczyce.
