= John II of Opava-Ratibor =

Duke of Racibórz, Krnov and Freudenthal, Governor of Kłodzko and Ząbkowice Śląskie

John II, Duke of Opava-Ratibor
- Coat-of-arms of Racibórz (Ratibor)
- Born: c. 1365
- Died: 22 July 1424
- Buried: Racibórz
- Noble family: Přemyslids
- Spouse: Helena of Lithuania
- Issue: Wenceslaus II; Nicholas V Margareta
- Father: John I, Duke of Opava-Ratibor
- Mother: Anna of Głogów-Żagań

John II, Duke of Opava-Ratibor (also known as John II of Troppau or John the Iron; Czech: Jan II. Opavský or Hanuš Ferreus; c. 1365 – 22 July 1424) was Duke of Opava-Racibórz (Ratibor), Krnov and Bruntál. From 1388 to 1397, he was also governor of Kłodzko and Ząbkowice Śląskie and from 1397 to 1422 pledge lord of Kłodzko and Ząbkowice Śląskie. He was a member of the Opava branch of the Přemyslid dynasty.

== Life ==
He was a son of Duke John I of Opava-Ratibor. John I had been the sole heir of the Duchy of Racibórz in 1365 and had founded the Opava-Ratibor branch of the family. When the Duchy of Opava was divided in 1377, John I had received the Duchies of Krnov and Bruntál. John II's mother was Anna, the daughter of Henry V of Głogów-Żagań.

After John I's death, his possession were divided by his sons, John II and Nicholas IV. Nicholas IV, the younger brother, received a share of Bruntál. As Nicholas IV was still a minor, John acted as his regent until 1385. When Nicholas IV died (between 1405 and 1407), John II inherited his share of Bruntál. John II sold the Duchy of Krnov, which had been separated from Opava in 1377, to Władysław II of Opole in 1384. John I had pledged Mikołów and the Duchy of Pless to Władysław II; John II redeemed these possessions.

In 1387, John II founded the city of Bieruń and appointed a certain Cussowitz as bailiff over Bieruń. In 1391, he gave the villages of Imielin, Kosztowy and Chełm Śląski on the eastern border of his duchy to the Bishop of Krakow. This implied that these villages were no longer part of Silesia. The village of Halemba near Ruda Śląska developed from an iron works founded by his brother Nicholas IV in 1394. In 1394, John II founded another iron works, named German: Bogutzker Hammer, on the spot of the deserted village of Bogucice. At the end of the 16th century, this settlement developed into the city of Katowice.

In 1389, the bishops of Wrocław and Olomouc and the Dukes of Legnica, Oleśnica, Głogów, Opava and Teschen formed an alliance for mutual protection and to preserve the public peace. John II did not sign this Treaty of Hotzenplotz, because he was a supporter of Margrave Prokop of Moravia.

John II was high steward of King Wenceslaus IV and this made him one of the most powerful men in the Kingdom of Bohemia. He also held the post of Burgrave of Karlštejn. In 1397, John II and other noble councillors accused Wenceslaus IV of neglecting his duties as King of the Romans and asked him to summon an Imperial Diet. The accusations were dealt with by Wenceslaus's councillors and favourites Stefan Poduška von Martinic, Stefan of Opočno, Burkhard Strnad of Janovice and the Prior of the Order of St. John, Marquard of Strakonice. When these men stood in the way of further demands by John and his companions, he invited them to a banquet at the Karlštejn Castle on 11 June 1397. There, he attacked them with the words You, gentlemen, have advised our Lord, the King, not to take care of our German land, because all you want is for him to become King of the Germans. He then killed them. In the same year, Jobst of Moravia had to pledge the counties of Kłodzko and Ząbkowice Śląskie to King Wenceslaus, who sold his pledge to John II.

After Wenceslaus's half-brother Sigismund besieged Ratibor in 1400, John II used the occasion of a meeting between Kings Wenceslaus IV and King Władysław II Jagiełło of Poland in Wrocław in 1404 to create an alliance against Hungary. After Wenceslaus's death, John II supported his successor, King Sigismund, and paid him homage in Wrocław in 1420 during the Imperial Diet. Rebellious Bohemians sent envoys to Grand Duke Vytautas of Lithuania, to offer him the Bohemian crown. When they traveled through Ratibor on 21 September 1421, they were arrested by the citizens and John II handed them over to King Sigismund. The Hussites retaliated by invading Ratibor. Sigismund rewarded Sigismund by transferring the rights to Krnov back to John II, who had to redeem Krnov from Duke Louis II of Brieg.

John II died in 1424 and was buried in the church of the Dominicans in Ratibor. It was not until 1427 that his sons agreed to divide his possessions: his son Wenceslaus received the City and Duchy of Racibórz, Nicholas received Krnov, Bruntál, Pszczyna, Rybnik and Baborów.

== Family ==
On 16 January 1407, John II married the Lithuanian Princess Helena of Lithuania, daughter of Dymitr Korybut and a niece of King Władysław II Jagiełło of Poland. In 1407, she received as her wittum, the amts of Pszczyna, Bieruń and Mikołów. In 1412, he added the Waldhufendorf villages south of Żory. After John's death, she used the title Baroness of Pszczyna from 1424 to 1449.

They had three children:

- Wenceslaus II (1405 - 29 October 1456).
- Nicholas V (1409 - 1452).
- Margareta (Czech: Markéta; Polish: Małgorzata; 1410 - d. 5 July 1459), married firstly Duke Casimir I of Oświęcim (d. 1434) and secondly Duke Siemowit V of Masovia (d. 1442)
