= Wenceslaus III of Rybnik =

Wenceslaus III, Duke of Rybnik
- Born: c. 1442
- Died: 1478; Kłodzko
- Noble family: Přemyslids
- Father: Nicholas V, Duke of Krnov
- Mother: Margaret Clemm of Ellguth

Wenceslaus III, Duke of Rybnik (also known as Wenceslaus II of Krnov and Rybnik; Czech: Václav V. z Rybnika a Pštíny; Polish: Wacław III rybnicki; German: Wenzel II. von Jägerndorf und Rybnik; c. 1442 – 1478 in Kłodzko) was co-ruler of Krnov from 1452 to 1464 and the sole ruling Duke of Rybnik from 1464 to 1474. He was a member of the Opava-Ratibor branch of the Přemyslid dynasty.

== Life ==
Wenceslaus was the younger son of Duke Nicholas V of Krnov and Ratibor, who was an opponent of the Hussites. His older brother was Jan III.

He was born between around 1442 and 1450.

Since Wenceslaus was still a minor when his father died in 1452, he was under the guardianship of his uncle Wenceslaus II and his step-mother, Barbara Rockemberg. From 1460 to 1464, Wenceslaus and his elder brother John IV ruled their territories together. In 1464, they divided the inheritance, with John IV taking Krnov, Bruntál and Wodzisław Śląski and Wenceslaus taking Rybnik with Żory and Pszczyna.

Wencelaus III supported King Vladislaus II of Bohemia and Hungary during the conflict between the Bohemian nobility and the Hungarians about control of Bohemia. The anti-Hungarian King Matthias Corvinus formed a coalition against Wenceslaus III. Members of the coalition included Duke Victor of Münsterberg and Opava and his brother Henry the Elder, as well as Duke Przemyslaus II of Cieszyn, Duke Nicholas II of Niemodlin and his brother John II of Opole. The coalition overthrew Wencelaus III in 1474 and he was taken prisoner by Matthias Corvinus, who handed him over to henry the Elder. Henry's brother Victor took Wenceslaus's possessions, however, he lost them again after Wenceslaus' death.

Wenceslaus died as a prisoner in 1478 in Kłodzko. He was unmarried and childless.
