= Wenceslaus I of Opava =

Wenceslaus I, Duke of Opava
- Born: c. 1361
- Died: 1381
- Noble family: Přemyslid dynasty
- Father: Nicholas II, Duke of Opava
- Mother: Judith of Niemodlin

Wenceslaus I of Opava (Czech: Václav I. Opavský; German: Wenzel I. von Troppau; c. 1361 – 1381) was a member of the Opava branch of the Přemyslid dynasty. He was Duke of Opava from 1367 until his death.

== Life ==
His parents were Duke Nicholas II of Opava and his third wife, Judith (born: before 1346; died: after October 1378), daughter of Duke Bolesław the Elder of Niemodlin (German: Falkenberg).

After their father's death in 1365 Wenceslaus I and his younger brother Przemko I at first stood under the guardianship of their elder brother John I, who was the sole heir of the Duchy of Racibórz from his mother, as well as a joint heir of the Duchy of Opava (from his father). In 1367, the Duchy of Opava was divided among the four brothers. In 1377, when Wenceslaus and Przemko had come of age, a new division was made. John received the Duchy of Krnov and the Lordship of Bruntál; the Duchy of Głubczyce was split off from Opava and given to Nicholas. Wenceslaus and Přemysl jointly ruled the rest of Opava.

Wenceslaus I died without issue in 1381, at an age of around 20. His brother Przemko I inherited his share of Opava.
