= John I of Opava-Ratibor =

John I, Duke of Opava-Ratibor
- Coat-of-arms of Racibórz (Ratibor)
- Born: c. 1322
- Died: 1380–1382
- Noble family: Premyslids
- Spouse: Anna of Głogów-Żagań
- Issue: John II "the Iron"; Nicholas IV; Margareta
- Father: Nicholas II, Duke of Opava
- Mother: Anna of Ratiboř

John I of Opava-Ratibor (Czech: Jan I. Ratibořský; German: Johann I. von Troppau-Ratibor; c. 1322 – 1380 or 1382 ) was the founder the Opava branch of the Bohemian Přemyslid dynasty, which lasted until 1521. In 1365, he became the sole heir of the Duchy of Racibórz. From 1367 to 1377 he ruled the Duchy of Opava (German: Troppau) jointly with his brothers, Nicholas III, Wenceslaus I and Przemko I. From 1377 until his death, he was also Duke of Krnov and Bruntál.

== Life ==
His parents were Nicholas II of Opava and Anna of Racibórz, a sister of Leszek of Racibórz, the last Duke of Racibórz from the Silesian Piast family. Leszek died in 1336 without heirs, causing Ratiboř to revert to the Crown. King John of Bohemia then enfeoffed Leszek's brother-in-law, Nicholas II, who was John I's father. Since John I was the only son of Nicholas II from his first marriage with Anna, John I was the sole heir of Racibórz. At the same time, he and his younger half-brother Nicholas III became guardians of Nicholas III's younger brothers Wenceslaus I and Přemysl. After disputes about the inheritance, Opava was divided in 1367 among the four brothers. In 1377, a new division was made, in which John I kept Racibórz, but also received the duchies of Krnov and Bruntál. The Duchy of Głubczyce was split off for Nicholas III; Wenceslaus I and Přemysl received the rest of Opava. When Wenceslaus died in 1381, Přemysl inherited Wenceslaus's share. When Nicholas III died in 1394, Přemysl inherited Głubczyce as well.

John I gave Magdeburg rights to the city of Opava in 1372. Because of financial difficulties, he sold Mikołów and the Principality of Pless to Duke Władysław II of Opole in 1375. His son John II later managed to buy both these possession back.

== Marriage and issue ==
In 1361 John I married to Anna, daughter of Henry V the Iron, Duke of Żagań and Głogów (d. 1369). They had three children

- John II "the Iron" (d. 1424), Duke of Opava-Ratibor
- Nicholas IV (died circa 1406), Duke of Bruntál
- Margareta (born: 1380 – died: before 7 September 1407),

married in Duke Boleslaus I of Cieszyn (d. 1431), no issue

== References and sources ==
- Ludwig Petry et al.: History of Silesia, Volume 1, Sigmaringen, 1988, ISBN 3-7995-6341-5.
- Hugo Weczerka: Handbuch der historischen Stätten: Schlesien, Stuttgart, 1977, ISBN 3-520-31601-3, Genealogical tables on pages 600-601.
