= Duchy of Krnov =

Silesian duchy (1377–1849)

Coordinates: 50°05′24″N 17°41′40″E

Duchy of Krnov Krnovské knížectví (Czech) Herzogtum Jägerndorf (German)
- 1377–1849
- Coat of arms

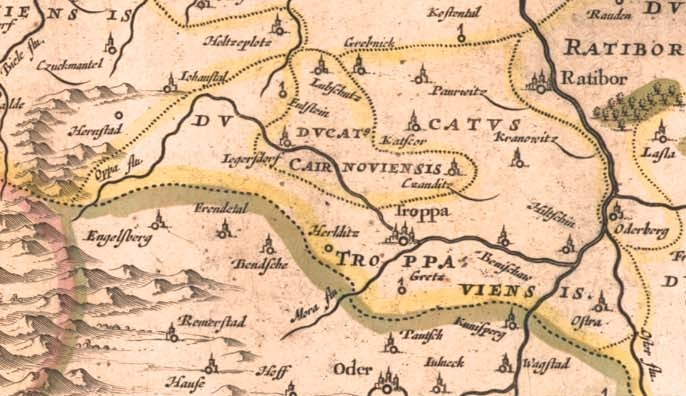
- Duchies of Opava and Krnov, map from Atlas Novus by Joan Blaeu, 1645
- Status: Silesian duchy Fiefdom of the Bohemian Crown
- Capital: Krnov
- Historical era: Late Middle Ages; Early modern period
  - Partitioned from Opava: 1377
  - Vladislaus II of Opole Duke: 1385
  - George of Brandenburg-Ansbach Duke: 1523
  - Merged into Austrian Silesia: 1849
Preceded by	Succeeded by
Duchy of Opava / Duchy of Troppau	Austrian Silesia / Austrian Silesia

The Duchy of Krnov (Latin: Ducatus Carnoviensis, Czech: Krnovské knížectví, Polish: Księstwo Karniowskie) or Duchy of Jägerndorf (German: Herzogtum Jägerndorf) was one of the Duchies of Silesia, which in 1377 emerged from the Duchy of Troppau (Opava), itself a fief of the Bohemian Crown. Its capital was at Krnov in the present-day Czech Republic.

== History ==
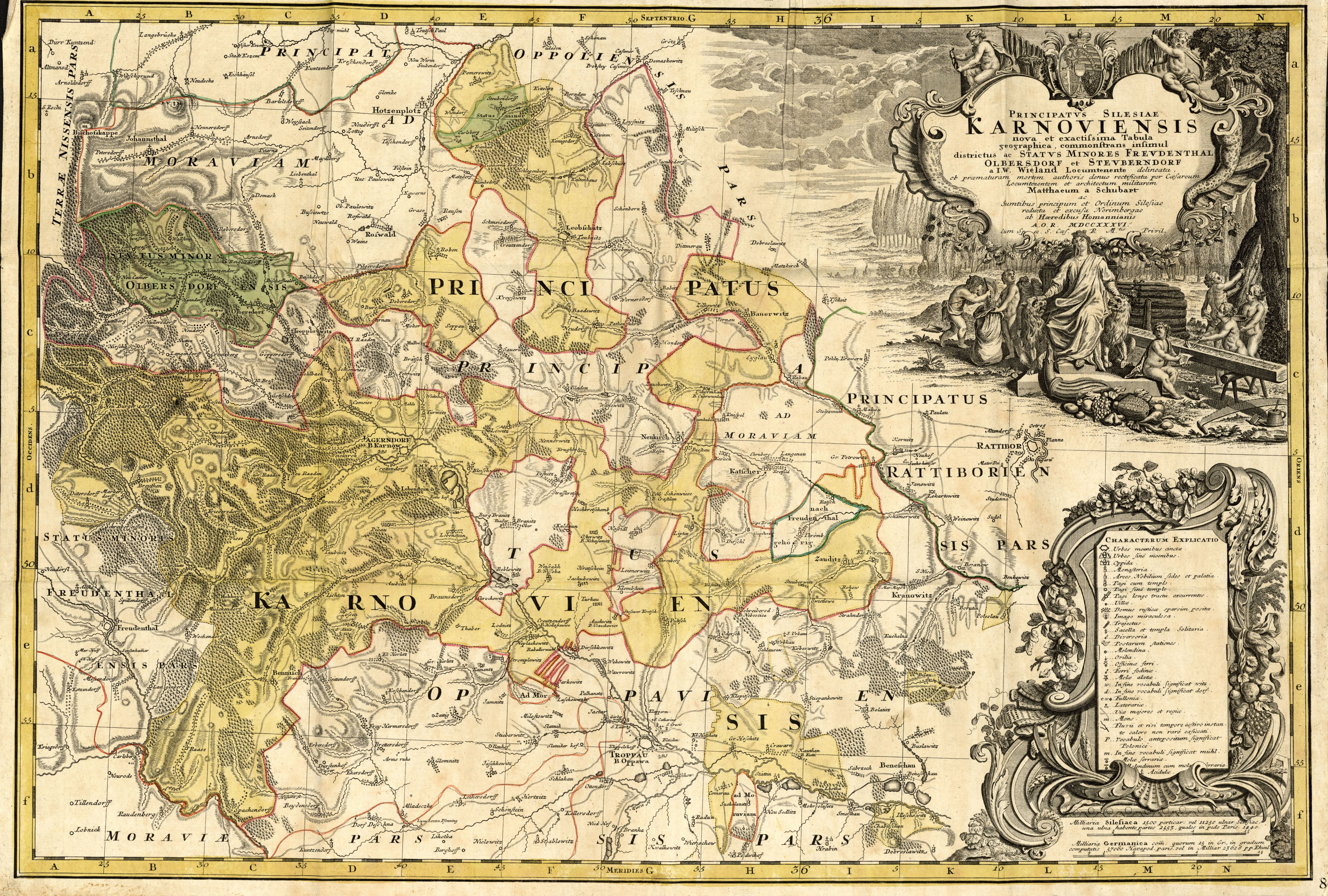
Silesian principality of Krnov, 1736 map

The province had been established in 1269 on lands which until then had been part of the Bohemian Margraviate of Moravia, when King Ottokar II of Bohemia vested his natural son Nicholas I with Opava. Together with the adjacent Duchy of Racibórz, it was under the direct rule of a cadet branch of the royal Přemyslid dynasty—unlike most other Silesian duchies ruled by the Silesian Piasts, who nevertheless in large part also had become Bohemian vassals in 1327. Nicholas retained Opava after the last Přemyslid ruler of Bohemia, King Wenceslaus III, was killed in 1306. In the following struggle for the Bohemian throne, he backed the claims of the Luxembourg candidate John the Blind, who in turn enfeoffed his son and successor Nicholas II with the Duchy of Opava in 1318. In 1337, Nicholas II also received the neighbouring Duchy of Racibórz upon the death of the last Piast duke Leszek.

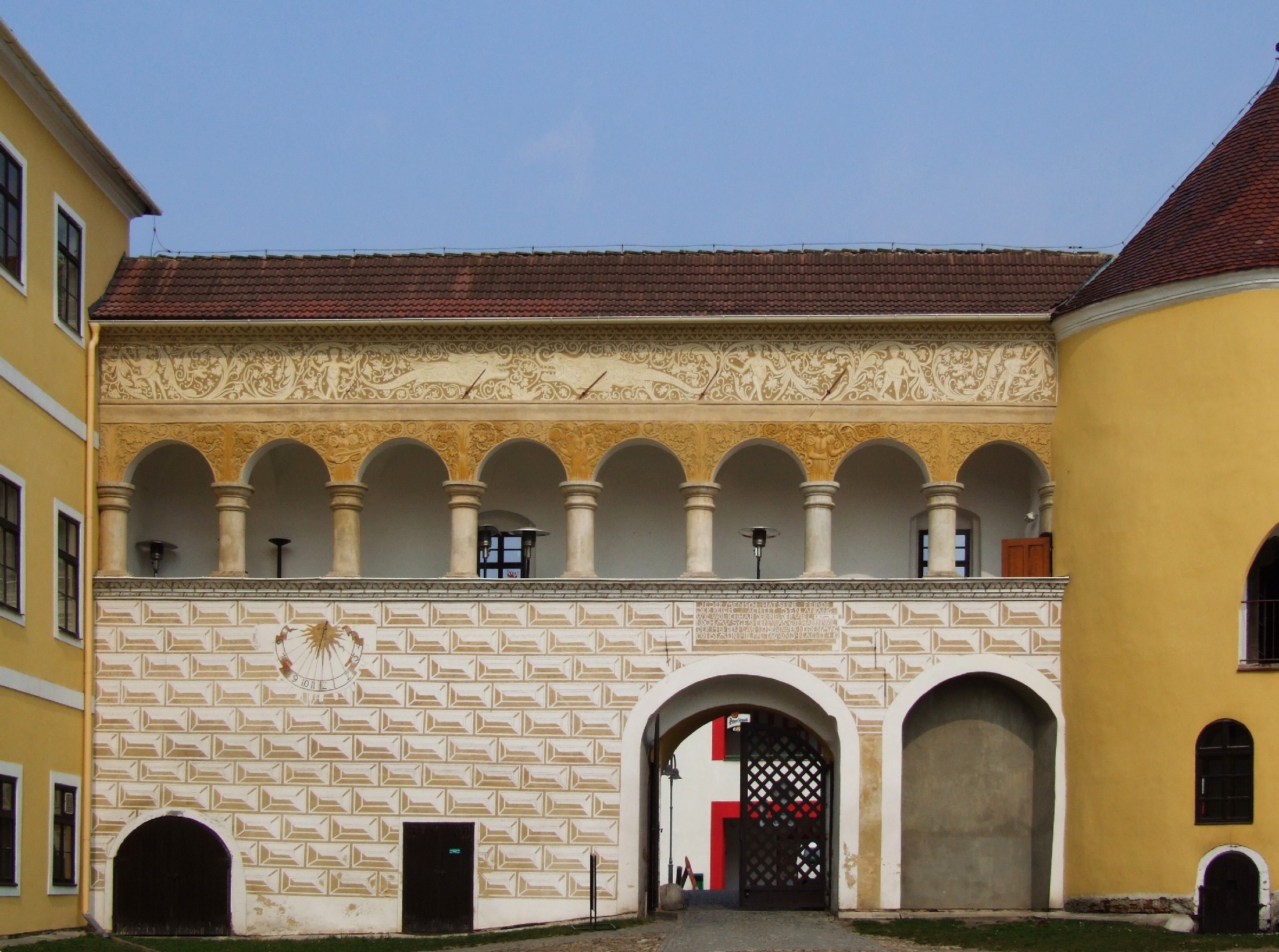
Krnov Castle

When Duke Nicholas II died in 1365, his eldest son John I inherited the Duchy of Racibórz, while the Duchy of Opava from 1367 was ruled jointly by him and his younger brothers Nicholas III, Wenceslaus I and Přemek I. When in 1377 the brothers finally divided their Opava heritage, the eldest, John I, received the newly established Duchy of Krnov together with the Bruntál estates. Upon his death in 1380/82, Racibórz, Krnov and Bruntál were inherited by his elder son John II "the Iron".

In 1384, Duke John II sold Krnov to the Piast duke Władysław of Opole, who ceded it to the Luxembourg margrave Jobst of Moravia in 1390. After Jobst had died in 1411, his cousin Emperor Sigismund pawned Krnov to the Piast duke Louis II of Brieg, but in 1422 again ceded it to John II, who could redeem the pledge. Two years later, the duchy was inherited by his sons Wenceslaus II and Nicholas V, who ruled jointly until 1437, when Nicholas received Krnov together with Bruntál, Pless, Rybnik, Loslau, and Sohrau. Upon his death in 1452, Krnov and Loslau fell to his elder son John IV, while Rybnik, Sohrau and Pless fell to his younger brother Wenceslaus III.

The Přemyslid dukes finally lost Krnov during the Bohemian–Hungarian War in 1474 to Matthias Corvinus, then anti-king of Bohemia, who had John IV captured and arrested. After John's death in 1483, his sister Barbara, consort of Duke Jan IV of Oświęcim, tried to regain the duchy; however, Vladislav II Jagiellon, having prevailed as Bohemian king, had no intention to return the seized duchy but enfeoffed his chancellor Johann von Schellenberg with Krnov instead. An agreement was reached in 1492, when Barbara's daughter Helena married Schellenberg's son George.

In 1523, George of Schellenberg had to sell Krnov to the Hohenzollern margrave George of Brandenburg-Ansbach, who could rely on the Hungarian inheritance of his consort Beatrice de Frangepan, widow of Matthias Corvinus. From 1532 the margrave ruled over all Upper Silesia, when he also inherited the Duchy of Opole and Racibórz from the Piast duke Jan II the Good. He had Krnov Castle rebuilt and introduced the Protestant Reformation in Silesia, having the local Teutonic Knights, Franciscans and Minorites expelled. The increasing power of the Protestant House of Hohenzollern in the Silesian crown lands was suspiciously eyed by Ferdinand I of Habsburg, Bohemian king since 1526. Nevertheless, George as well as his son Margrave George Frederick, who ruled from 1543, were able to keep the duchy. The conflict aggravated when George Frederick died childless in 1603 and bequested Krnov to his cousin Elector Joachim III Frederick of Brandenburg, who gave it to his son Johann Georg in 1607. The Habsburg rulers regarded the duchy a reverted fief and after the Bohemian Revolt and the 1620 Battle of White Mountain Emperor Ferdinand II confiscated the Hohenzollern possessions in his Bohemian lands. Ferdinand's loyal supporter Prince Karl I of Liechtenstein, Duke of Opava since 1613, received Krnov. Both duchies were merged in 1623 and subjected to Counter-Reformation.

Coat of arms of Liechtenstein (with the hunting horn for Krnov)

The House of Hohenzollern never withdrew the claims and more than one hundred years later, the Krnov and Racibórz possessions were a pretext for the Prussian king Frederick the Great to start the First Silesian War, ending with the annexation of most of Silesia according to the Treaty of Breslau in 1742. While a small northern part was merged into the now Prussian Duchy of Opole, the bulk of Krnov remained with the Bohemian Crown as part of Austrian Silesia. Re-organised as the Krnov District (Krnovský kraj) from 1751, it was finally dissolved after the 1848 Revolution, when Austrian Silesia was raised to the status of a Cisleithanian crown land.

== See also ==
- Dukes of Silesia
