= Městský fotbalový stadion =

Městský fotbalový stadion (English: Municipal football stadium) may refer to many football stadiums in the Czech Republic:

- Městský fotbalový stadion Srbská in Brno
- Městský fotbalový stadion Miroslava Valenty in Uherské Hradiště
- Městský stadion (Benešov)
- Městský stadion (Karviná)
- Městský stadion (Mladá Boleslav)
- Městský stadion (Opava)
- Městský stadion (Ostrava)
- Městský stadion (Ústí nad Labem)
- Městský stadion (Znojmo)
