= Wenceslaus I =

Wenceslaus I may refer to:

- Saint Wenceslaus I, Duke of Bohemia (907–935 or 929), and subject of a Christmas carol
- Wenceslaus I of Bohemia (c. 1205–1253), King of Bohemia
- Wenceslaus I of Legnica (c. 1318 – 1364)
- Wenceslaus I, Duke of Luxembourg (1337–1383), the first Duke
- Wenceslaus I, Duke of Saxe-Wittenberg (1337—1388)
- Wenceslaus I, Duke of Opava (1361–1381)
- Wenceslaus I, Duke of Cieszyn (1413/18 – 1474)
- Wenceslaus I of Zator (c. 1418 – before 29 July 1468)
