= Nicholas II of Opava =

- Duke of Opava
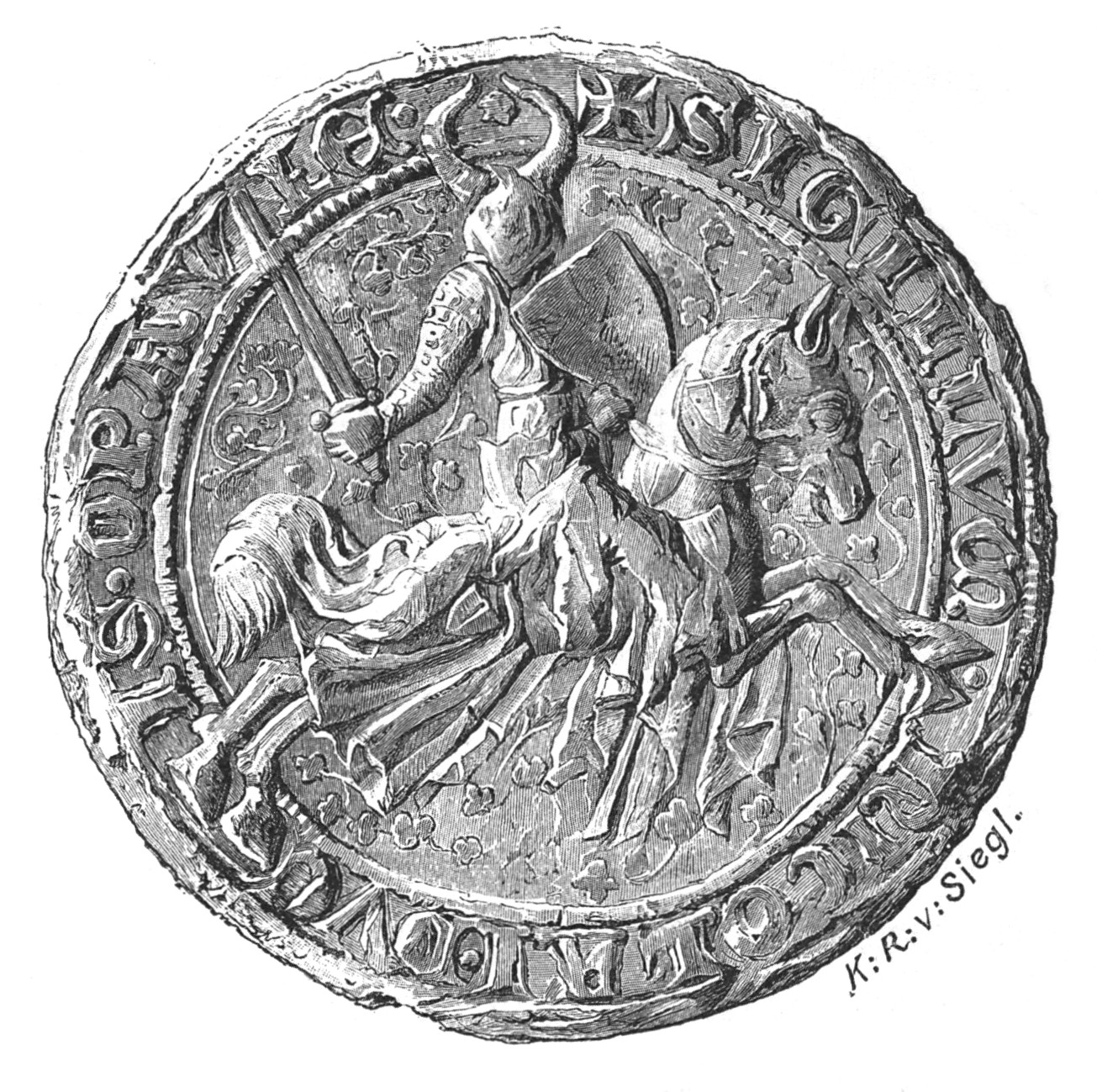
- Seal of the Duke Nicholas II
- Born: 1288
- Died: 8 December 1365 (aged 76–77)
- Noble family: Přemyslid-Opava
- Spouses: Anna of Racibórz; Hedwig of Oleśnica; Jutta of Opole-Falkenberg
- Issue: John I Euphemia; Elisabeth; Agnes; Anna; Margaret; Nicholas III; Anna; Wenceslaus I Przemko I
- Father: Nicholas I, Duke of Opava
- Mother: Adelheid of Habsburg

Nicholas II of Opava (also: Nicholas II of Troppau, Nicholas II of Ratibór; Czech: Mikuláš II. Opavský; 1288 – 8 December 1365) was Duke of Opava (German: Troppau) from 1318 to 1365 and Duke of Ratibór from 1337 to 1365 and Burgrave of Kladsko (German: Glatz) from 1350 to 1365 and also chamberlain of the Kingdom of Bohemia.

== Life ==
Nicholas II of Opava was a member of the Opava branch of the Bohemian noble Přemyslovci family. His parents were Duke Nicholas I of Opava, who had held Opava since 1269, and Adelheid of Habsburg, a niece of King Rudolf I. He was a supporter of King John of Luxembourg of Bohemia, who gave him Opava as a fief in 1318 and at the same time raised it to an independent duchy. He moved the ducal residence from Hradec nad Moravicí (German: Grätz) to Opava (German: Troppau). Also in 1318, he married with Anna, the only sister of Duke Leszek of Ratibór. Since Leszek left no offspring, the Duchy of Ratibór reverted to the Bohemian Crown after Leszek death in 1336. King John gave it to his loyal vassal Nicholas II in 1337. With his dual power base in Opava and Ratibór, Nicholas became one of the most powerful princes in the upper Oder area. With the acquisition by Nicholas, Ratibór came under a foreign ruler and due to the personal union, Opava became more oriented towards Silesia. In 1337, the princes of Opole also claimed Ratibór; King John sold them the Moravian town of Prudnik (German: Neustadt) instead. In a document dated 1350, Nicholas II is mentioned as Burgrave of Kłodzko. In 1355 he had to give up Koźle and Gliwice, which had been transferred to Duke Leszek.

== Marriage and issue ==
Nicholas was married three times. Around 1318 he married Anna of Racibórz (died around 1340), a daughter of Duke Przemysław of Racibórz. Several children resulted from this marriage:

- John I (died: between 1380 and 1382),

married in 1361 Anna, a daughter of the Duke Henry V of Głogów-Żagań (died 1369). He established the Opava-Ratibór line of the Přemyslovci family.

- Euphemia (died 1352)

married in 1335 Duke Siemowit III of Mazovia (died 1381)

- Elisabeth (died 1386), a nun in Ratibór
- Agnes (died 1404), a nun in Ratibór
- Anna (died 1361)

married in 1346 Count Burchard of Hardegg and Retz, Burgrave of Magdeburg (died 1360 or 1361)

- Margaret (died 1363)

married in 1349 the Margrave John Henry of Moravia (died 1375).

After Anna's death, Nicholas married in May 1342 to Hedwig (died 1359), a daughter of Duke Konrad I of Oleśnica (died 1366). From this marriage, he had a son

- Nicholas III (died 1394), Duke of Głubczyce 1377–1394

In 1360, Nicholas married his third wife, Jutta (died after 1378), a daughter of the Duke Boleslaw II of Opole-Falkenberg. This marriage produced three more children:

- Anna (died 1398)

married in 1379 Peter Holický of Šternberk (died 1397)

- Wenceslaus I (died 1381), Duke of Opava 1377–1381
- Przemko I (Czech: Přemysl I; died 1433), Duke of Opava 1365-1433 and Duke of Głubczyce 1394-1433
