= Martin Pařízek =

Czech footballer

Personal information
- Date of birth: 30 December 1974 (age 51)
- Place of birth: Zlín, Czechoslovakia
- Height: 1.95 m (6 ft 5 in)
- Position: Goalkeeper

Youth career
- Zbrojovka Brno

Senior career*
Years	Team	Apps	(Gls)
1993–1998	Boby Brno	10	(0)
1994–1995	→ Švarc Benešov (loan)	5	(0)
1998–2002	Drnovice	15	(0)
2001–2002	→ Olomouc (loan)	0	(0)
2002–2006	Ionikos	16	(0)
2004–2006	→ Niki Volos (loan)		
2005	Saba Battery		
2006	Kunovice		

International career
1994	Czech Republic U21	1	(0)
- * Club domestic league appearances and goals

Martin Pařízek (born 30 December 1974) is a retired footballer, who played as a goalkeeper.

== Club career ==
Born in Zlín, Pařízek began playing youth football with FC Boby Brno. He joined the club's professional squad, and appeared in ten Czech First League matches in five years at the club. While playing a home match on loan at Benešov, Pařízek was left unconscious following approximately 100 Sparta Prague fans invading the pitch on 4 March 1995.

He moved to Drnovice in 1998, where he spent three seasons in the First League, before moving on loan to Olomouc for a season.

Pařízek moved to Greece in July 2002, initially joining Greek first division side Ionikos F.C. and making 16 league appearances in two seasons. He later played on loan in the Greek second division with Niki Volos F.C., before moving to Iran for a brief spell with Saba Battery.

Pařízek returned to his native Czech Republic at the age of 31, joining Czech 2. Liga side Kunovice in January 2006. This signalled a return to working with manager Oldřich Machala, who Pařízek had played with during his previous spell at Olomouc. In 2010 Pařízek was operating as a member of the Referees Commission in the Czech Republic.
