= Nicholas IV, Duke of Ratibor-Bruntál =

- Coat-of-arms of Racibórz (Ratibor)
- Born: c. 1370
- Died: c. 1406
- Noble family: Přemyslid dynasty
- Father: John I, Duke of Opava-Ratibor
- Mother: Anna of Glogau-Sagan

Nicholas IV of Bruntál (also known as Nicholas IV of Ratibor and Bruntál, also Nicholas I of Opava-Ratibor; Czech: Mikuláš IV. z Bruntálu; German: Nikolaus IV. von Freudenthal; c. 1370 – c. 1406) was a member of the Opava branch of the Přemyslid dynasty. He was co-ruler of Ratibor and Bruntál with his brother John II "the Iron".

== Life ==
His parents were Duke John I of Opava-Ratibor and his wife Anna, a daughter of Duke Henry V of Glogau-Sagan (d. 1369). His father had inherited the Duchy of Ratibor in 1365 as the sole heir and became the founder of the Opava-Ratibor line of the Opavian branch of the Přemyslid dynasty.

Nicholas IV was still a minor when his father died in 1380/1382. His older brother John II inherited the duchies of Ratibor, Krnov and Bruntál. Around 1385, a part of Bruntál was split off for Nicholas IV.

Nicholas died around 1406, unmarried and without issue. His share of Bruntál fell to his brother John II, who then held the whole Duchy of Bruntál.
