= Městský stadion (Benešov) =

Football stadium in Benešov, Czech Republic

- Stadion u Konopiště
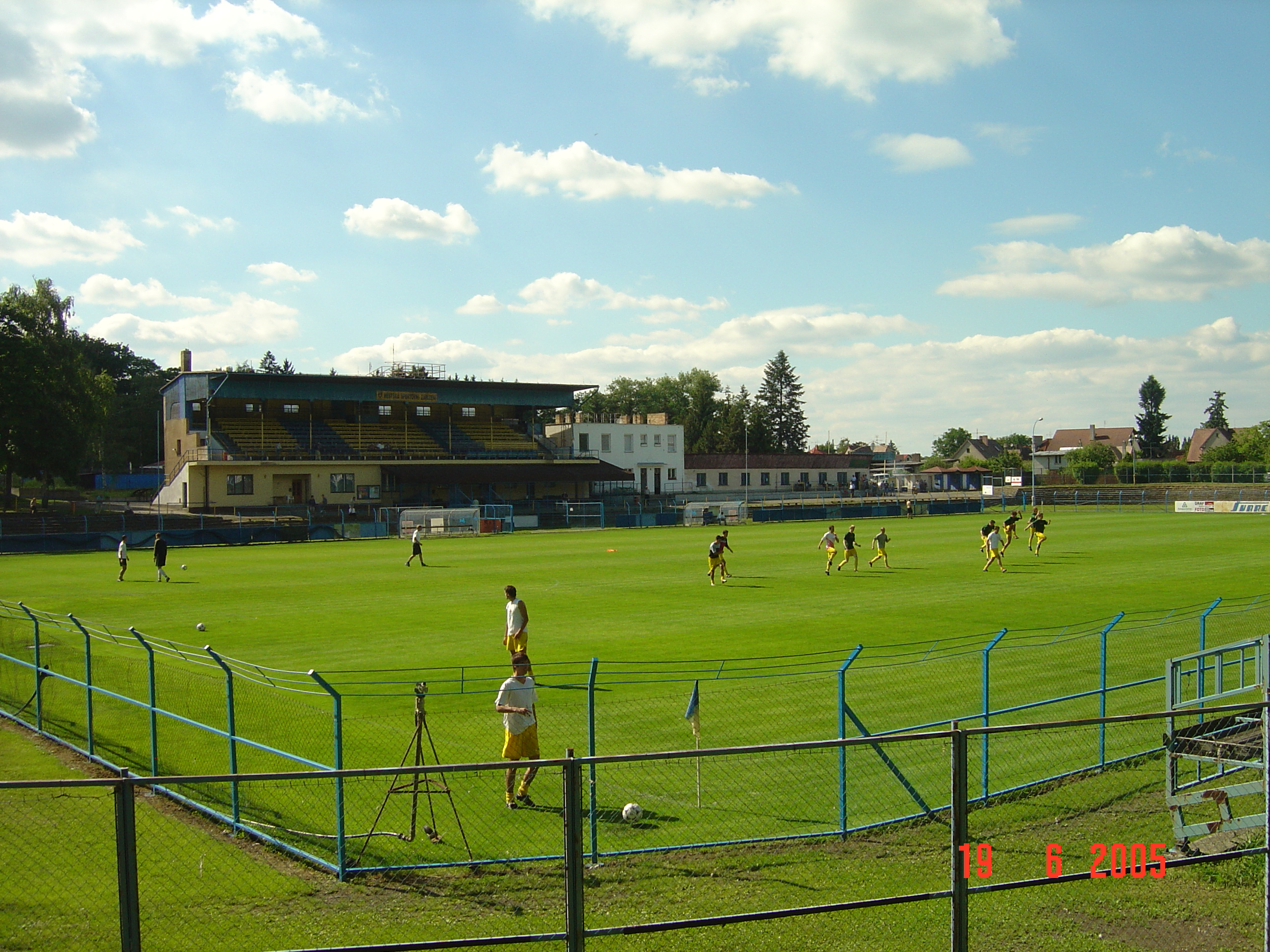
- Interactive map of Městský stadion
- Location: Ke Stadionu 576; Benešov; Czech Republic, 256 01
- Coordinates: 49°46′36″N 14°40′41″E
- Capacity: 8,000

Construction
- Opened: 1922

Tenant
- SK Benešov

Městský stadion (transl. Municipal Stadium), also known as Stadion u Konopiště (transl. Stadium at Konopiště), is a football stadium in Benešov, Czech Republic. It is the home stadium of SK Benešov. It hosted top-flight football in the 1994–95 season. The stadium holds 8,000 spectators.

The ground was the location of a pitch invasion by Sparta Prague fans on 4 March 1995, resulting in home team goalkeeper Martin Pařízek being rendered unconscious. The Czech Football Association fined the home team 30,000 Czech koruna for the incident and instructed the club to play its next home game at least 100 kilometres (62 mi) from Benešov.
