= Therese Krones =

Austrian actress (1801–1830)

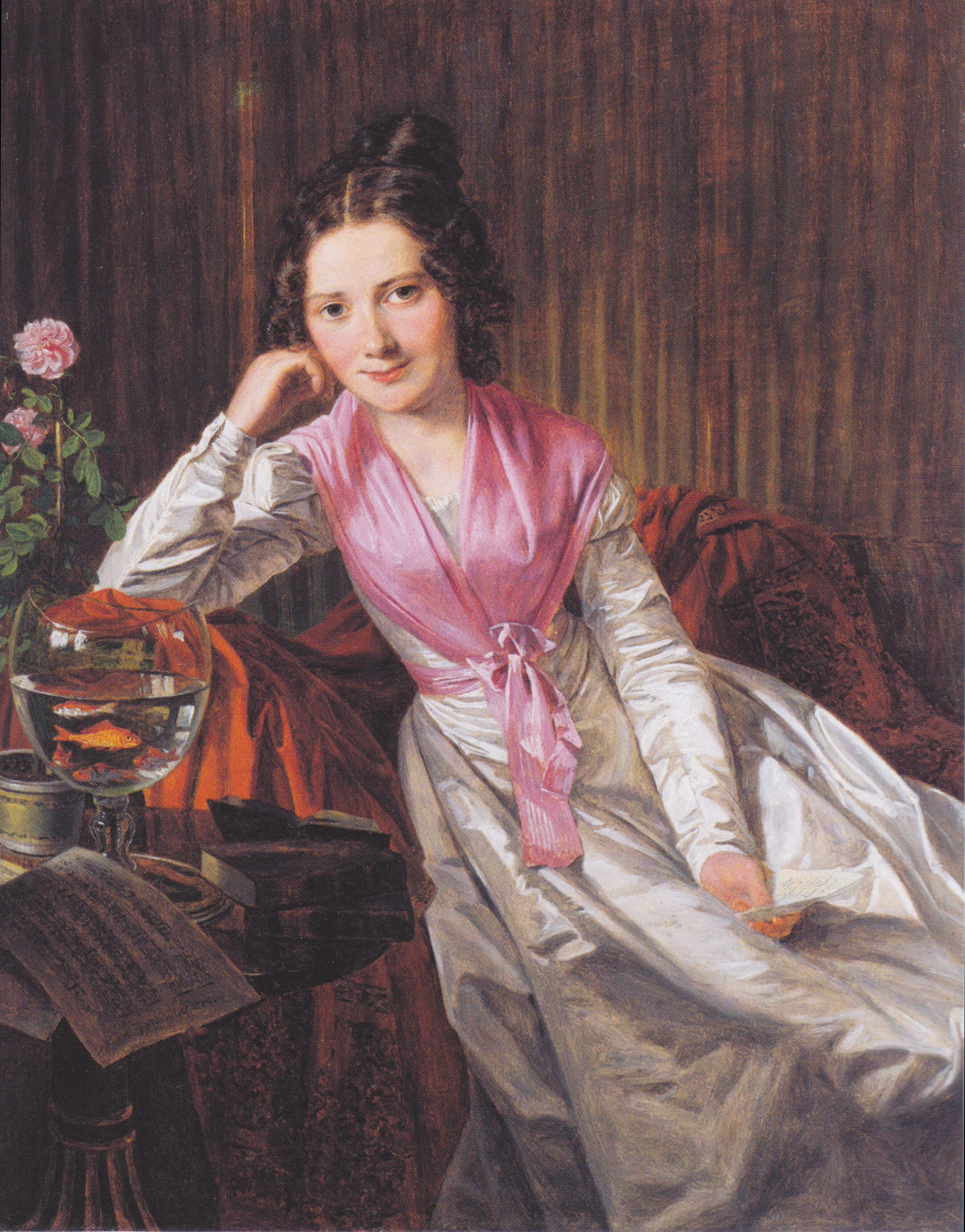
- Therese Krones, 1824, by Ferdinand Georg Waldmüller
- Born: 7 October 1801; Bruntál
- Died: 28 December 1830 (aged 29); Vienna, Austria
- Resting place: St. Marx Cemetery; Vienna Zentralfriedhof (reburied 1930)
- Occupation: actress

Therese Krones (7 October 1801 – 28 December 1830) was an Austrian actress.

== Life and career ==
She was born 7 October 1801 in Bruntál to parents who were engaged in the theatrical business, Franz Josef Krones (1766–1839) and his wife Anna Theresia Walter (* 1770). The actor Josef Krones was her brother.

After several provincial tours she appeared at the Leopoldstädter Theater in Vienna, where she played with Ferdinand Raimund, who greatly influenced her technique.

In 1821, she made her debut in the play Das lustige Trauerspiel Evakathel und Prinz Schnudi oder die Belagerung von Ypsilon by Philipp Hafner.

In 1827, she retired from the stage for a time, her reputation being unjustly tainted by her association with the Polish nobleman Severin von Jaroszynski, who was tried and executed that year for the murder of Johann Conrad Blank, an incident which she knew nothing of. For a while she even considered entering into a convent, but was later persuaded not to. During this time she wrote several plays: Sylphide, das See-Fräulein (1828), Der Branntweinbrenner und der Nebelgeist (1829), and Kleopatra (1830).

Krones made a brief comeback in early 1830, moving from the Leopoldstädter to the Theater an der Wien. The revival of her career was short-lived, however, for she died on 28 December 1830 in Vienna after a short but serious illness of stomach, aged only 29. She was buried at the St. Marx Cemetery, and in 1930 was exhumed and reburied in an honorary grave in the Vienna Zentralfriedhof.
