= Wenceslaus II of Opava-Ratibor =

Wenceslaus II, Duke of Opava-Ratibor
- Coat-of-arms of Racibórz (Ratibor)
- Born: c. 1405
- Died: 29 October 1456
- Buried: Church of the Dominican monastery at Ratibor.
- Noble family: Přemyslids
- Spouse: Margaret of Szamotuły
- Father: John II, Duke of Opava-Ratibor
- Mother: Helen of Lithuania

Wenceslaus II, Duke of Opava-Ratibor (also known as Wenceslaus I of Ratibor and Krnov; Czech: Václav IV. Ratibořský; c. 1405 – 29 October 1456) was a member of the Opavian branch of the Přemyslid dynasty. He was Duke of Ratibor and Kronov jointly with his brother Nicholas V from 1424 to 1437 and the sole Duke of Ratibor from 1437 until his death.

== Life ==
His parents were John II "the Iron" and his wife Helen of Lithuania, a niece of King Jogaila of Poland. Wenceslaus fought together with his father and other Silesian princes on the Polish side against the Teutonic Knights in the Hunger War in 1414.

Although Wenceslaus and his older brother Nicholas V were probably already adults when their father died in 1424, their mother, Helen of Lithuania, acted as regent until 1428. From 1428 to 1449, she styled herself as Lady of Pleß; presumably Pleß was her Wittum. From 1428 to 1437, Wenceslaus and Nicholas V ruled their territory jointly. In 1437, it was divided, with Wenceslaus taking Ratibor and Nicholas taking Duchy of Krnov, Bruntál, Rybnik, Pleß and Baborów.

In late 1437, a majority of the Bohemian Estates elected Albert II from the House of Habsburg as the new King of Bohemia. A minority favoured his eleven-year-old rival Casimir, the son of King Jogaila of Poland. In 1438, Poland invaded Silesia and devastated the Duchies of Opole and Ratibor. After this, Duke Wenceslaus of Ratibor, as well as Duke Wenceslaus I of Zator and his brothers Duke Przemysław of Toszek and Duke Jan IV of Oświęcim, were willing to accept Casimir as King, under certain conditions. Nevertheless, all Silesian Dukes paid homage to Albert II in Wrocław in November 1438.

After Nicholas V died in 1452, Wenceslaus took up the guardianship over his underage sons John IV "the Elder" and Wenceslaus III, jointly with their step-mother, Barbara Rockenberg, until 1464. From 1452 to 1462, she styled herself Lady of Pleß; presumably Pleß was her Wittum.

Duke Wenceslaus of Ratibor died in 1456 and was buried in the church of the Dominican monastery at Ratibor.

== Marriage and issue ==
In 1437, Wencelsaus married Margaret (d. 1464), a daughter of Vincent of Szamotuły, Castellan of Międzyrzecz and widow of Casimir II of Belz. They had the following children:

1. John III "the Younger" (d. 1493), married c. 1478 to Magdalena (d. 1501), daughter of Duke Nicholas I of Opole
2. Catherine (d. 1480), married Władisław of Danaborz (d. 1467)
3. Helena (d. 1480), married John of Ostroróg (d. 1501), Palatine of Poznań
4. Anna (d. 1480)
