= Oldřich Machala =

Czech footballer and coach (born 1963)

Personal information
- Date of birth: 4 August 1963 (age 63)
- Place of birth: Bruntál, Czechoslovakia
- Height: 1.82 m (6 ft 0 in)
- Position: Defender

Youth career
- 1970–1981: TJ Moravský Beroun
- 1981–1982: Sigma Olomouc

Senior career*
Years	Team	Apps	(Gls)
1982–1984	VTJ Tábor		
1984–1991	Sigma Olomouc	198	(14)
1991–1992	Hansa Rostock	15	(1)
1992–1993	VfB Oldenburg	49	(1)
1993–2001	Sigma Olomouc	217	(3)

International career
1996	Czech Republic	1	(0)

Managerial career
- 2001–2002: Sigma Olomouc B
- 2002–2005: Hranice
- 2005–2006: FK Kunovice
- 2006–2007: Dosta Bystrc
- 2007–2008: SK Lipová
- 2008–2009: Hradec Králové
- 2009–2011: Fotbal Frýdek-Místek
- 2011–2013: 1. HFK Olomouc
- 2014: 1. SC Znojmo
- 2015–2017: MFK Vyskov (youth coach)
- 2017–2019: 1. SK Prostejov
- 2020–2021: Blansko
- 2021: 1. SK Prostejov (U19 manager)
- 2022: 1. HFK Olomouc
- * Club domestic league appearances and goals

Oldřich Machala (born 4 August 1963) is a Czech football coach and a former player.

== Career ==
Machala was born in Bruntál. He played most of his Gambrinus liga career for SK Sigma Olomouc, for which he earned 414 league caps, most in the club's history. He is considered a legendary footballer of the club. In 2000, he won the Personality of the League award at the Czech Footballer of the Year awards. He won his only cap for the Czech Republic as a last-minute substitute against Nigeria in 1996.

Machala joined 1. HFK Olomouc as manager in 2011 and led his team to the Moravian–Silesian Football League title and ensuing promotion to the Czech 2. Liga in his first season with the club.
