= Wittum =

Historical term for property set aside for widows

Wittum (Latin: vidualitium), Widum or Witthum (widow's seat) is a medieval Latin legal term, known in marital and ecclesiastical law.

== Provide for a widow at the wedding ==
The term referred initially to steps taken by a husband to provide for his wife if she became a widow. The wittum was often stipulated by law.

Originally the wittum consisted only of movable property. Later it became real property, which was designated by a certificate. The wittum became more and more similar to the dower, or replaced dower, until finally Wittum and dower were no longer clearly separated. The wittum provided a pension for widows because it was in their possession for their entire life.

In old German law, the wittum was a purchase price to be paid by the groom to the head of the bride's family in order to receive guardianship authority over the bride (Wittemde, Wettma, also Mund). Later it was a grant from the husband to the woman to provide for her in widowhood (Doarium, Dotalicium, Vidualicium, jointure), mostly made in usufruct for life on land (Witwengut). Wittum is in particular to be granted for the maintenance of the widow of the monarch or the widow of a prince of a royal house.

Noble families who put up their female members in monasteries would equip these with the so-called "Widumshöfen". In order to free the noble nuns of any work, the monasteries received courtyards along with serfs to supply the ladies. In this context, the term "Widumshof" has been transferred to the parish where a "Pfarrhof" served as an economic basis for the priest.

== Name for a parsonage or parochial benefice ==
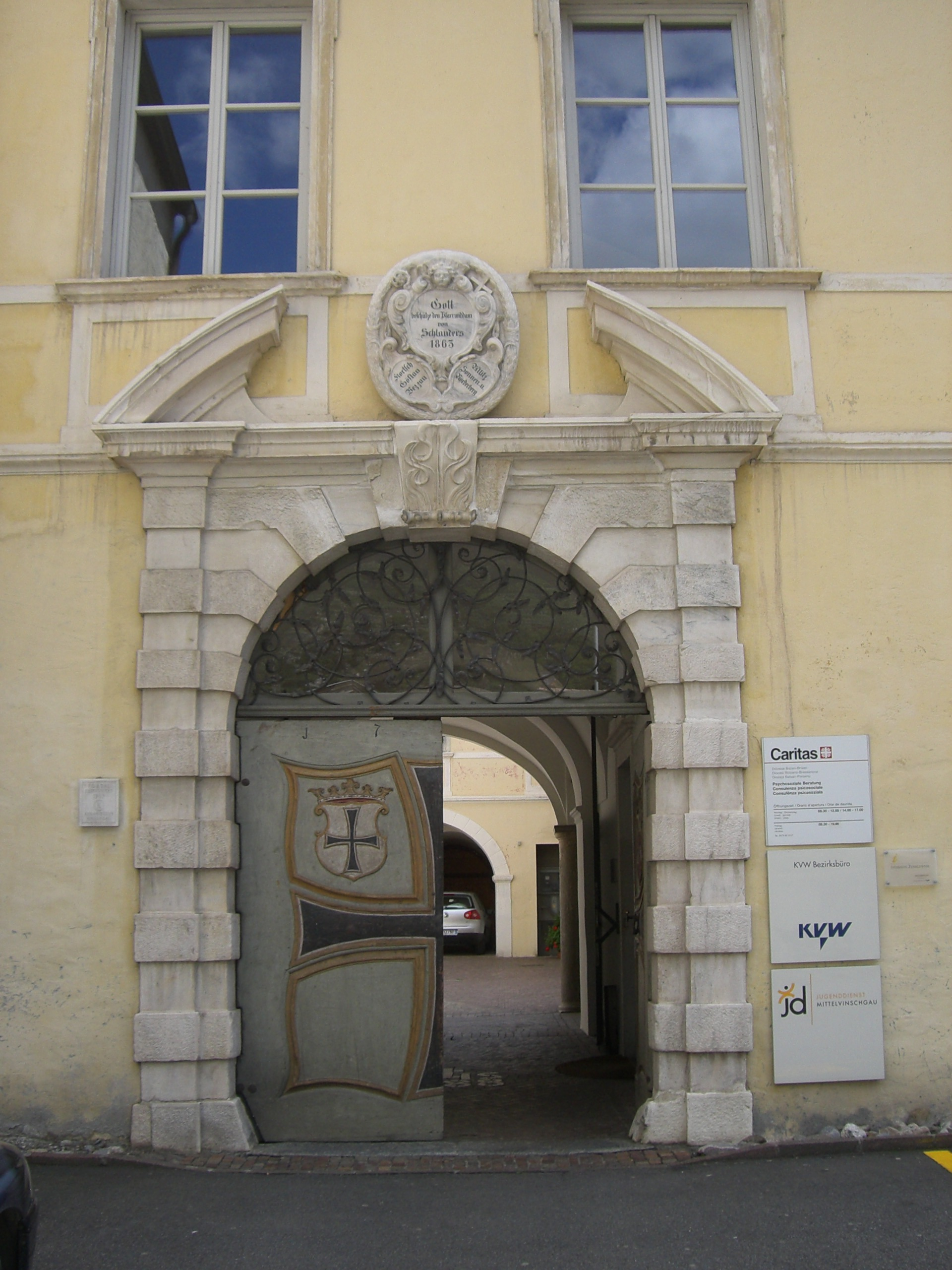
Widum in Schlanders

In Bavaria and Tirol Widum or Widdum is the term for the immovable assets of the parish benefice, and especially for the rectory. In northern Germany, the (medium) Low German term Wedeme is used.

Widum emerged today, albeit in modified form, as a local road or field name to, and in Austria as a designation of the residential and commercial buildings of a Catholic parish. In Lübeck, the "Wehde" is the historic parish house of St. Mary's Church.

The word "wittum" is derived from the same root her as "widmen" ('dedicate'); wittum thus refers to a "dedicated good". In Tyrol and South Tyrol, it is still used as a term for a parsonage. Later, provisions for a widow were called "wittum" because these were "dedicated assets". The linkage of the word "wittum" with "widow" is considered folk etymology and incorrect.

== Examples ==
An example is the Calvörde Castle in Calvörde, Saxony-Anhalt.

== See also ==
- Mund (in law)
