= Duchy of Racibórz =

Polish Duchy from 1172-1202 and 1281-1521

Coordinates: 50°05′20″N 18°12′37″E

Duchy of Racibórz Księstwo raciborskie (Polish) Ratibořské knížectví (Czech) Herzogtum Ratibor (German)
- 1172–1202; 1290–1337; 1437–1521
- Coat of arms

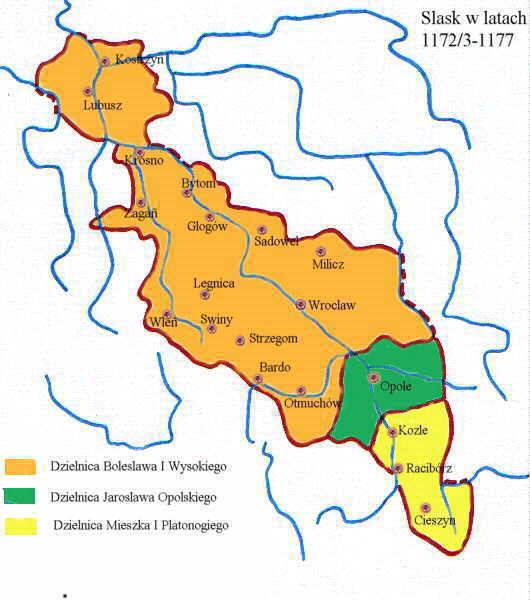
- Silesia 1172-77: Duchy of Racibórz (Mieszko Tanglefoot) in yellow, Duchy of Opole (Jarosław) in green
- Status: Silesian duchy Fiefdom of Bohemia (from 1327) and of the Bohemian Crown (from 1348)
- Capital: Racibórz (Ratibor)
- Historical era: Middle Ages
  - Partitioned from Wrocław: 1172
  - United with Opole: 1202
  - Split off Opole: 1281
  - Vassalized by Bohemia: 1327
  - To Přemyslid dukes of Opava: 1337
  - United with Opole: 1521
  - Fell to Bohemia: 1532
- Currency: Racibórz heller
Preceded by	Succeeded by
Duchy of Silesia	Duchy of Opole and Racibórz
- Today part of: Poland; Czech Republic

Duchy of Racibórz (Polish: Księstwo raciborskie, Czech: Ratibořské knížectví, German: Herzogtum Ratibor) was one of the duchies of Silesia, formed during the medieval fragmentation of Poland into provincial duchies. Its capital was Racibórz in Upper Silesia.

== History ==
After Bolesław I the Tall and his younger brother Mieszko I Tanglefoot backed by Emperor Frederick I Barbarossa had retained their Silesian heritage in 1163, the Duchy of Racibórz was formed in 1172 as a territory for Mieszko. It was centered on the towns of Racibórz, Koźle and Cieszyn. Mieszko's small share was enlarged the first time in 1177, when he received the territories of Bytom, Oświęcim, Zator, Pszczyna and Siewierz from his uncle High Duke Casimir II the Just of Poland. In 1202 Mieszko occupied the Duchy of Opole of his deceased nephew Jarosław, forming the united Duchy of Opole and Racibórz.

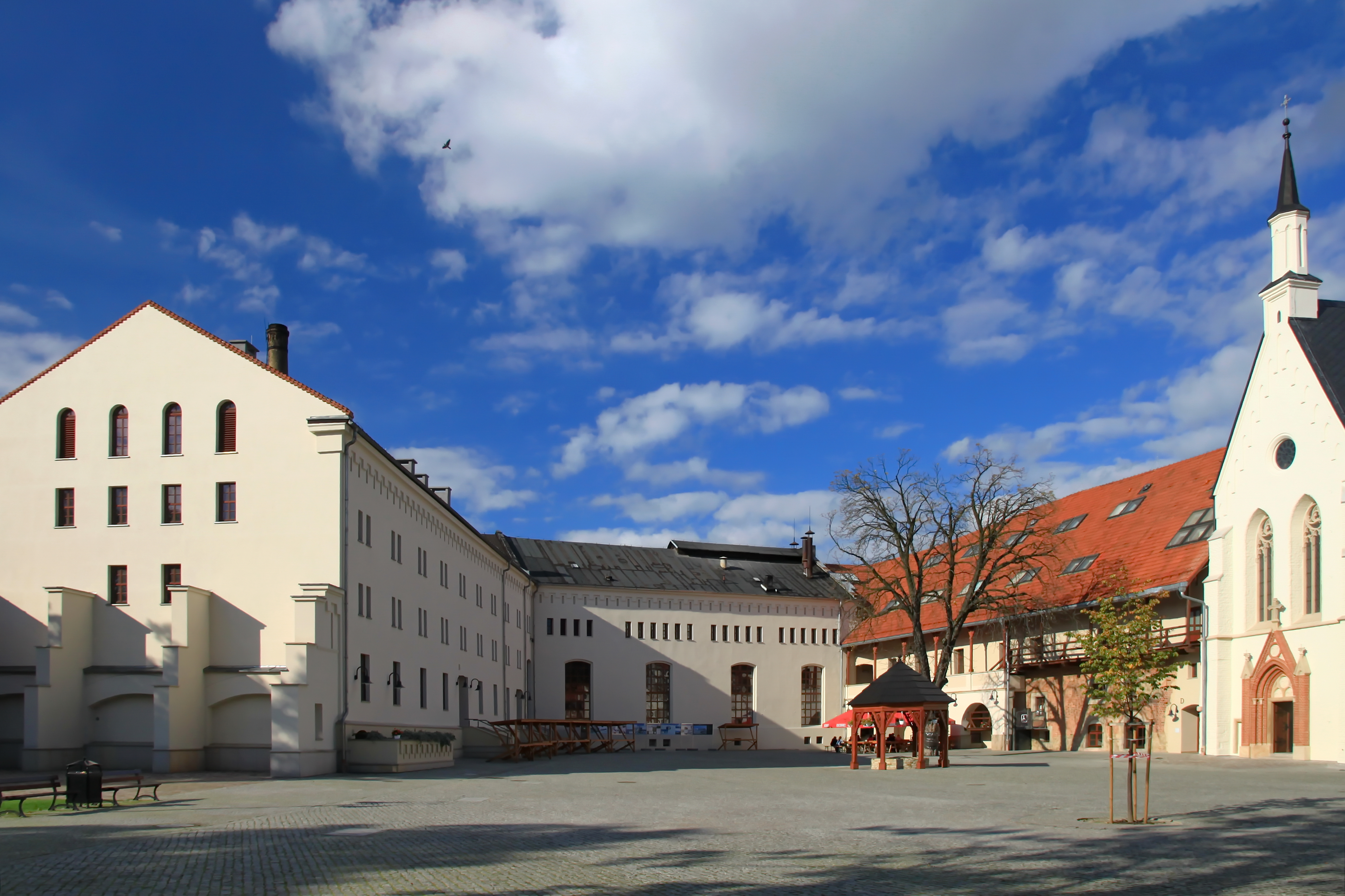
Racibórz Castle

After the death of Mieszko's grandson Duke Władysław Opolski in 1281, his sons again divided the Duchy of Opole and Racibórz and in 1290 the Duchy of Racibórz was recreated again, assigned to Władysław's youngest son Przemysław. Racibórz at that time comprised the lands of Wodzisław, Żory, Rybnik, Mikołów and Pszczyna, while some of the territory of was used for the creation of the duchies of Cieszyn and Bytom under Przemysław's brothers.

A large number of place names of German origin in the southern part of the Duchy are the effect of medieval Ostsiedlung.

In 1327 Przemysław's son Duke Leszek paid homage to King John of Bohemia, whereafter his duchy became a Bohemian fief. After Leszek died without issue in 1336, King John seized the duchy and granted it to the Přemyslid Duke Nicolas II of Opava (Troppau), forming the united Duchy of Opava and Racibórz. The Duchy would suffer several territorial changes until in 1521 it was again merged with Opole under Duke Jan II the Good. As a Duchy of Opole and Racibórz, after Jan's death in 1532 it fell back to the House of Habsburg, Bohemian kings since 1526. The fief was given in pawn to Margrave George of Brandenburg-Ansbach from the House of Hohenzollern. From 1645 to 1666 as part of the Duchy of Opole and Racibórz it was held by the Polish House of Vasa. It was annexed and incorporated into the Kingdom of Prussia by the 1742 Treaty of Breslau.

The title of a "Duke of Ratibor" was acquired by Landgrave Victor Amadeus of Hesse-Rotenburg in 1821. King Frederick William IV of Prussia in 1840 granted it to the landgrave's nephew Prince Victor of Hohenlohe-Schillingsfürst, in turn for his renunciation of the Hohenlohe inheritance in favour of his younger brother Chlodwig.

On 18 September 1939, in the skirmish of Pociecha in the Kampinos Forest, in which three TKS tankettes destroyed three German tanks, two Panzer 35(t)s and a Panzer IV Ausf. B, from the 1t. Leichte Division. As a result of the battle the commander of the German platoon and heir to the Duchy of Racibórz, 23-year-old Silesian prince and lieutenant Viktor IV Albrecht Johannes von Ratibor, who rode in the Panzer IV, was killed.

Rudy Palace, near Ratibor, was the main residence of the Dukes until 1945.

== Dukes ==
=== Silesian Piasts ===
- Mieszko I Tanglefoot (1172–1211)

United with Opole from 1202.

- Casimir I of Opole (1211–1230), son, under the tutelage of Duke Henry I the Bearded until 1238
- Mieszko II the Fat (1230–1246), son
- Władysław of Opole (1246–1281), brother

Split off Opole, Cieszyn and Bytom.

- Mieszko of Cieszyn (1281–1290), son of Władysław, Duke of Cieszyn in 1290, jointly with his brother
  - Przemysław (1281–1306)
- Leszek (1306–1336), son of Przemysław, died without issue

Line extinct, duchy seized as a reverted fief by King John of Bohemia.

=== Přemyslid dukes of Opava ===
- Nicholas II (1337–1365)
- John I (1365–1378), son, also Duke of Krnov from 1377
- John II (1378–1424), son
- Nicholas V (1424–1437), son, jointly with his brother
  - Wenceslaus (1424–1456)
- John III (1456–1493), son of Wenceslaus
- Nicholas VI (1493–1506), son, jointly with his brothers
  - John IV (1493–1506)
  - Valentin (1493–1521)

Line extinct, duchy inherited by Duke Jan II the Good of Opole.

=== House of Hohenlohe-Schillingfürst ===
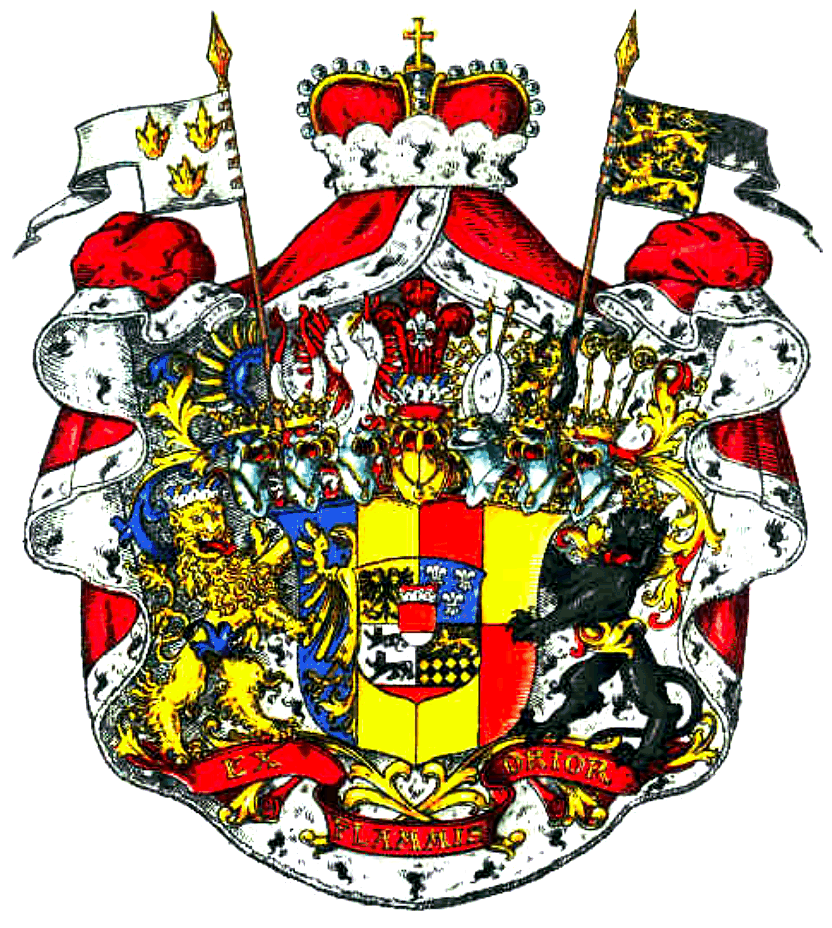
Arms of the Dukes of Ratibor and Princes of Corvey

Dukes of Ratibor and Princes of Corvey

- Victor I Moritz Carl (1840–1893)
- Victor II Amadeus (1893–1919)

Heads of the House of Ratibor after World War I

- Victor II Amadeus (1919–1923)
- Victor III August Maria (1923–1945)
- Franz-Albrecht Metternich-Sándor (1945–2009)
- Victor IV Metternich-Sándor (since 2009)

== See also ==
- Duke of Opole
- Dukes of Silesia

== Bibliography ==
- ŽÁČEK, Rudolf. Dějiny Slezska v datech. Praha : Libri, 2003. ISBN 80-7277-172-8.
