= Duchy of Troppau =

Silesian duchy (1269–1918)

Duchy of Troppau Herzogtum Troppau (German) Opavské vévodství (Czech) Księstwo Opawskie (Polish) Ducatus Oppaviensis (Latin)
- 1269–1918
- Flag Coat of arms

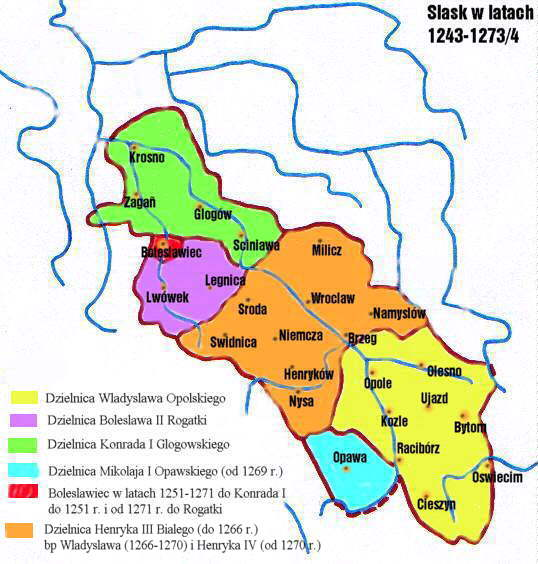
- Silesia 1249-1273: Opava under Nicholas I in turquoise
- Status: Silesian duchy Fiefdom of Bohemia; Part of the Lands of the Bohemian Crown (since 1348)
- Capital: Troppau; 49°56′N 17°54′E
- Common languages: Czech, German, Polish
- Religion: Roman Catholicism, Protestantism
- Historical era: Middle Ages
  - Partitioned from Moravia: 1269
  - Personal union with Racibórz: 1337
  - Partitioned from Racibórz: 1377
  - Further partitions: 1424, 1433 and 1452
  - Directly to Bohemia: 1462
  - Northern part to Prussia: 1742
  - abolished: 1918
Preceded by	Succeeded by
Margraviate of Moravia	Czechoslovakia
- Today part of: Czech Republic; Poland

The Duchy of Troppau (German: Herzogtum Troppau) or Principality of Opava (Czech: Opavské knížectví; Polish: Księstwo Opawskie) was a historic territory split off from the Margraviate of Moravia before 1269 by King Ottokar II of Bohemia to provide for his natural son, Nicholas I. The Opava territory thus had not been part of the original Polish Duchy of Silesia in 1138, and was first ruled by an illegitimate offshoot of the Bohemian Přemyslid dynasty, not by the Silesian Piasts like many of the neighbouring Silesian duchies. Its capital was Opava (Troppau) in the modern-day Czech Republic.

From 1337 onwards, the Přemyslid dukes also ruled the adjacent former Piast Duchy of Racibórz, whereupon Opava became united with the Upper Silesian lands. When the Opava branch became extinct in 1464, it fell back to the Bohemian Crown, from 1526 part of the Habsburg monarchy. In the final three centuries of its existence, the duchy was ruled by the House of Liechtenstein. It was dissolved with the Austro-Hungarian Empire in 1918, but the title of Duke of Troppau and Jägerndorf still exists, belonging to a present-day monarch, Prince Hans-Adam II of Liechtenstein. The Duchy of Jägerndorf (Krnov) was another of the Silesian duchies.

== History ==
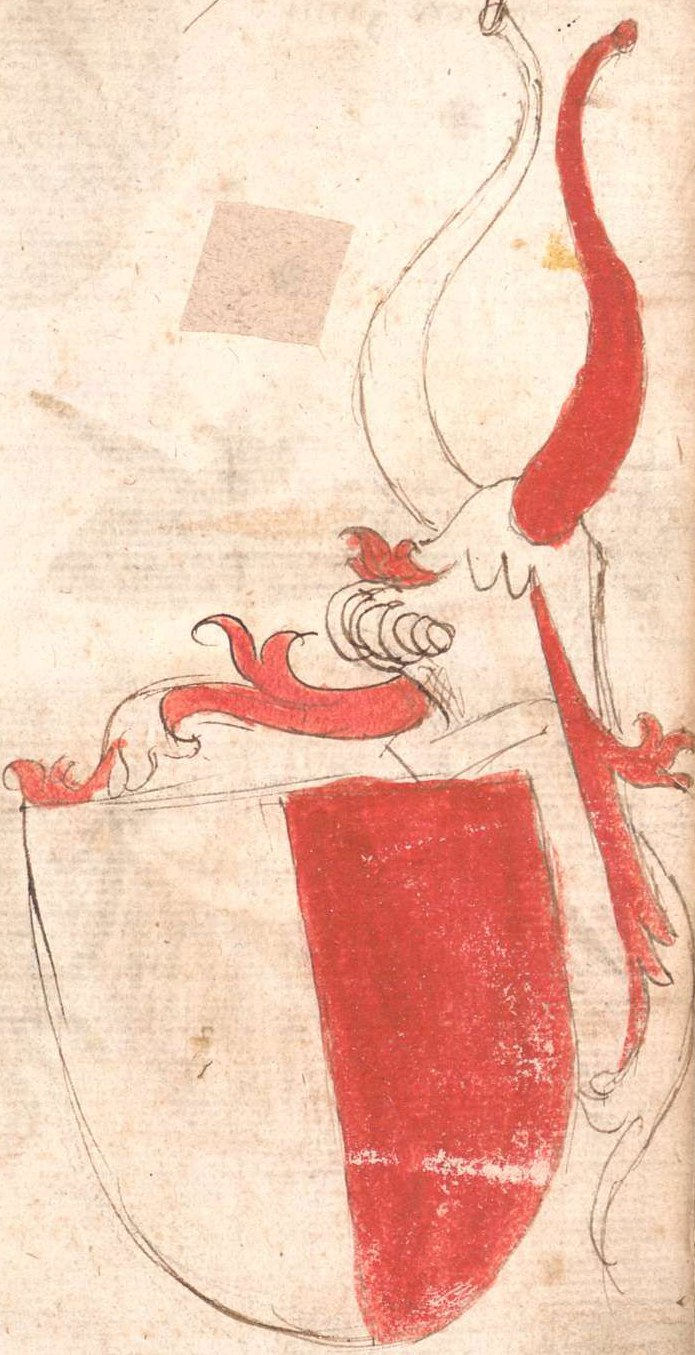
Coat of arms of the Duke of Opava, Wernigerode Armorial, late 15th century

Opava was initially established as a Moravian province under the rule of King Ottokar's son Nicholas I, who first appeared as a "Lord of Opava" (Latin: Dominus Oppaviae) in 1269 and became the progenitor of the Opava branch of the Přemyslid dynasty. After Ottokar was killed in the 1278 Battle on the Marchfeld, Nicholas had to ward off against claims raised by his stepmother Kunigunda of Halych and her lover Záviš of Falkenstein residing at Hradec Castle near Opava. Nevertheless, he reached his confirmation by both the Habsburg king Rudolf I of Germany and his stepbrother King Wenceslaus II of Bohemia and retained his territory even after the murder of the last Přemyslid king Wenceslaus III of Bohemia in 1306.

Upon the extinction of the royal branch of the Přemyslid dynasty and the subsequent turmoil around the Bohemian throne, Henry of Carinthia gave Opava in pawn to the Silesian duke Bolesław III the Generous. When finally in 1310 the mighty House of Luxembourg ascended to the throne, it was redeemed by King John of Bohemia in 1311. Opava was officially raised to a duchy in 1318 and was confirmed as a fief for Nicholas' son Duke Nicholas II by King John, who soon had to fend off the Hungarian troops of King Casimir III of Poland. The conjunction with Silesia was accomplished when Duke Nicholas II married Anna of Racibórz, sister of the Piast Duke Leszek of Racibórz, also a Bohemian vassal since 1327. When Leszek died without heirs in 1336, King John vested his brother-in-law Nicholas II with the Silesian Duchy of Racibórz (Ratibor, Ratiboř), whereafter he ruled both duchies in personal union until his death in 1365, when his eldest son John I succeeded him.

In 1377, Duke John I again separated Opava from the duchies of Racibórz and Krnov (Jägerndorf, Krnów) and granted it to his younger brothers Nicholas III (†1394), Wenceslaus I (†1381) and Przemko (†1433). Afterward, Opava ownership changed several times, mainly due to purchase and partitions. Przemko's sons sold their shares to the Bohemian king George of Poděbrady by 1462; their Přemyslid cousins however retained Racibórz and Krnov. In 1465 King George gave Opava to his second son Victor, who also became Duke of Münsterberg in 1462. Victor in turn had to cede it to the Bohemian anti-king Matthias Corvinus in 1485, who installed his illegitimate son John as duke.

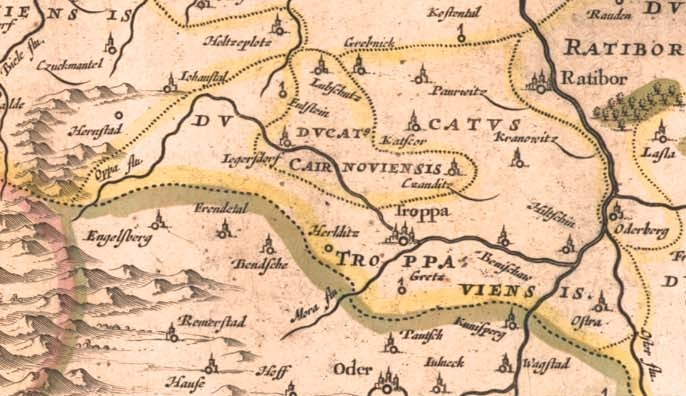
Duchy of Opava with Krnov, map from Atlas Novus by Joan Blaeu, 1645

In 1506 King Vladislas II Jagiellon of Bohemia granted Opava to Duke Casimir II of Cieszyn (Teschen), who had married a daughter of Victor and held the duchy until his death in 1528, after which it was again seized by Bohemia. Meanwhile, in 1521, with the death of Duke Valentin of Racibórz, the Opava line of the Přemyslids had finally become extinct and all their possessions had fallen back to the Bohemian Crown, which in 1526 passed to the Habsburg monarchy. Prince Karl I of Liechtenstein was invested with the Duchy of Troppau in 1614 by Emperor Matthias of Habsburg. After the 1620 Battle of White Mountain Prince Karl also acquired the Duchy of Krnov, and ever since the heads of the Princely Family of Liechtenstein bear the title "Duke of Troppau and Jägerndorf". The related Ducal Hat (or coronet) is now visible at the Treasure Chamber in Vaduz.

In 1742, in the course of the First Silesian War and the Treaty of Breslau, the Duchy was divided once more, with the part north of the Opava River including Głubczyce (Leobschütz, Hlubčice) and Hlučín (Hultschin) becoming part of Prussia. The southern part with Krnov, Bruntál (Freudenthal), Fulnek and Opava itself remained part of Austrian Silesia, a crown land of the Austrian Empire from 1804.

The Austrian Duchy of Troppau ceased to exist when the Austro-Hungarian Empire was dissolved in 1918 and the area (Troppauer Land) including the city became part of Czechoslovakia. The Prussian share (reduced by the territory of the Hlučín Region which new Czechoslovak state also reclaimed for itself) remained a part of the Silesian province until 1945, when it fell to Poland in accord with the Potsdam Agreement.

== See also ==
- Dukes of Silesia

== Literature ==
- Seidl, Elmar (1996). Das Troppauer Land zwischen den fünf Südgrenzen Schlesiens – Grundzüge der politischen und territorialen Geschichte bis zur Mitte des 19. Jahrhunderts (in German). Hess. ISBN 9783873362154.
