= Duchy of Głubczyce =

Historical Silesian duchy

Coordinates: 50°12′10″N 17°49′14″E

Duchy of Głubczyce (Czech: Hlubčické knížectví, German: Herzogtum Leobschütz, Polish: Księstwo Głubczyckie) was one of the duchies of Silesia. Its capital was Głubczyce in Upper Silesia.

== Bibliography ==
- ŽÁČEK, Rudolf. Dějiny Slezska v datech. Praha : Libri, 2003. ISBN 80-7277-172-8.
