= Bruntál =

Town in the Czech Republic

- Town
- The square Náměstí Míru

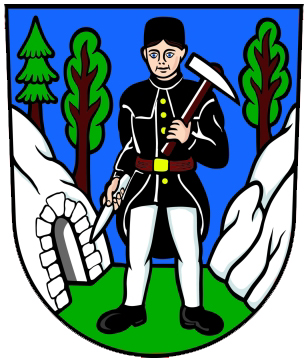
- Flag Coat of arms

- Location in the Czech Republic
- Coordinates: 49°59′18″N 17°27′53″E
- Country: Czech Republic
- Region: Moravian-Silesian
- District: Bruntál
- First mentioned: 1223

Government
  - Mayor: Martin Henč

Area
  - Total: 29.34 km^{2} (11.33 sq mi)
- Elevation: 409 m (1,342 ft)

Population (2026-01-01)
  - Total: 14,791
  - Density: 504.1/km^{2} (1,306/sq mi)
- Time zone: UTC+1 (CET)
  - Summer (DST): UTC+2 (CEST)
- Postal code: 792 01
- Website: www.mubruntal.cz

Bruntál (Czech pronunciation: [ˈbruntaːl]; German: Freudenthal) is a town in the Moravian-Silesian Region of the Czech Republic. It has about 15,000 inhabitants. The town is located on the stream Černý potok in the Nízký Jeseník range.

Bruntál was founded in the 13th century as a mining town. The historic town centre is well preserved and is protected as an urban monument zone. The main landmark of the town is the Bruntál Castle.

== Administrative division ==
Bruntál consists of two municipal parts (in brackets population according to the 2021 census):

- Bruntál (14,935)
- Karlovec (1)

Karlovec forms an exclave of the municipal territory.

== Etymology ==
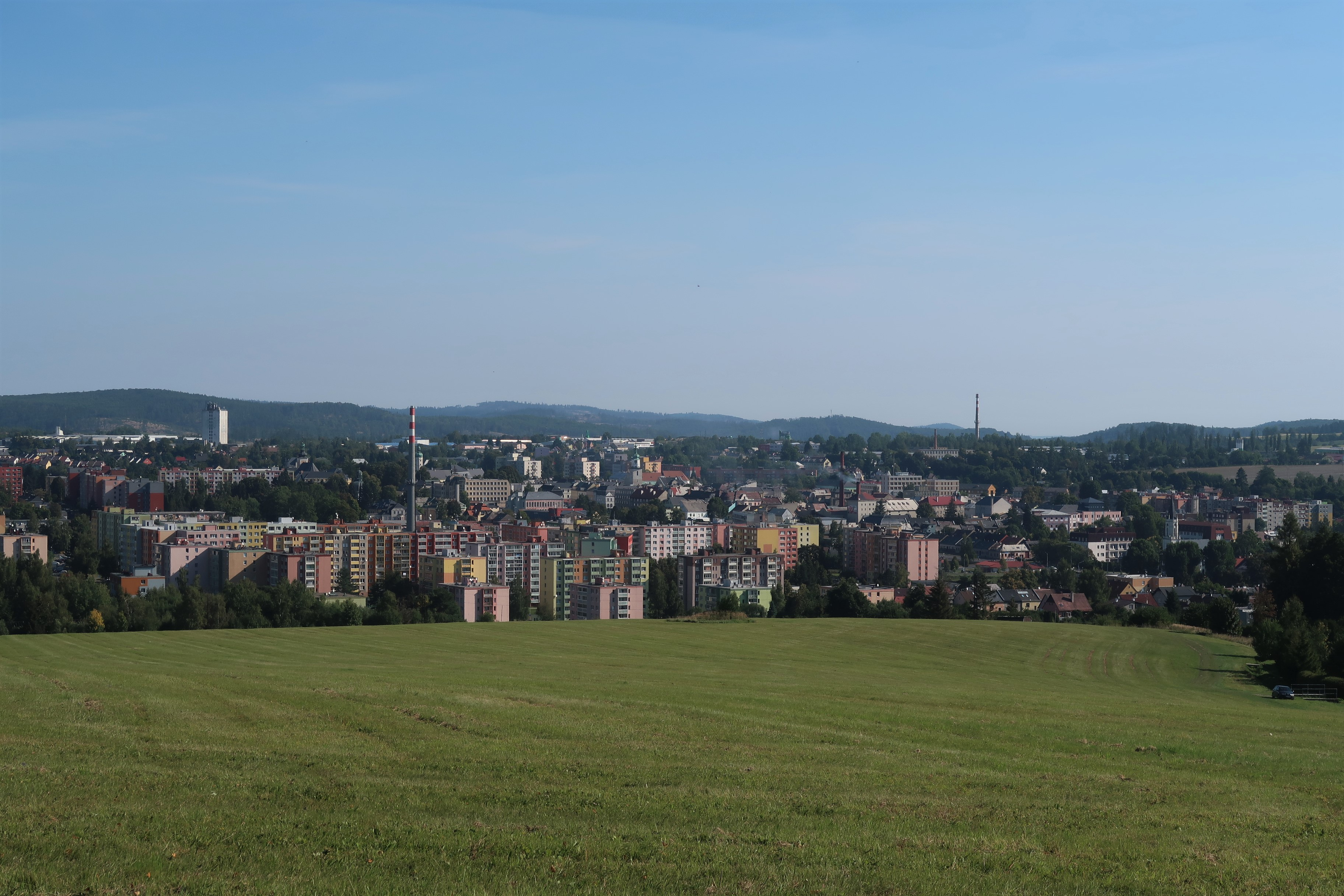
View of Bruntál from Uhlířský vrch

The original German name Freudenthal means 'valley of joy' and refers to the town's location in a valley. The Czech name was later created by transcribing the German name.

== Geography ==
Bruntál is located about 45 kilometres (28 mi) north of Olomouc and 55 km (34 mi) northwest of Ostrava, in the historical region of Czech Silesia. It lies in the Nízký Jeseník range. The town lies in a valley surrounded by several hills. The highest point is the hill Uhlířský vrch at 672 m (2,205 ft) above sea level.

The stream Černý potok with its tributaries, the Bukový potok, Kobylí potok and Vodárenský potok, flows through Bruntál. The Kobylí Pond is located in the middle of the town. The fishpond Bukový rybník with a surface area of 5 ha (12 acres) lies in the northern part of the municipal territory. The Karlovec exclave is located on the banks of the Slezská Harta Reservoir, about 5 km (3 mi) southeast of the town centre.

The most remarkable geological site in the municipal territory of the town is Uhlířský vrch. Uhlířský vrch is a stratovolcano (compositive volcano) formed by both explosive and effusive eruptions, and is thus composed of pyroclastic rocks, of which 40–80% consist of lapilli, 10–50% consist of volcanic bombs and the rest, volcanic ash. It is one of the youngest extinct volcanoes in the Czech Republic.

== History ==
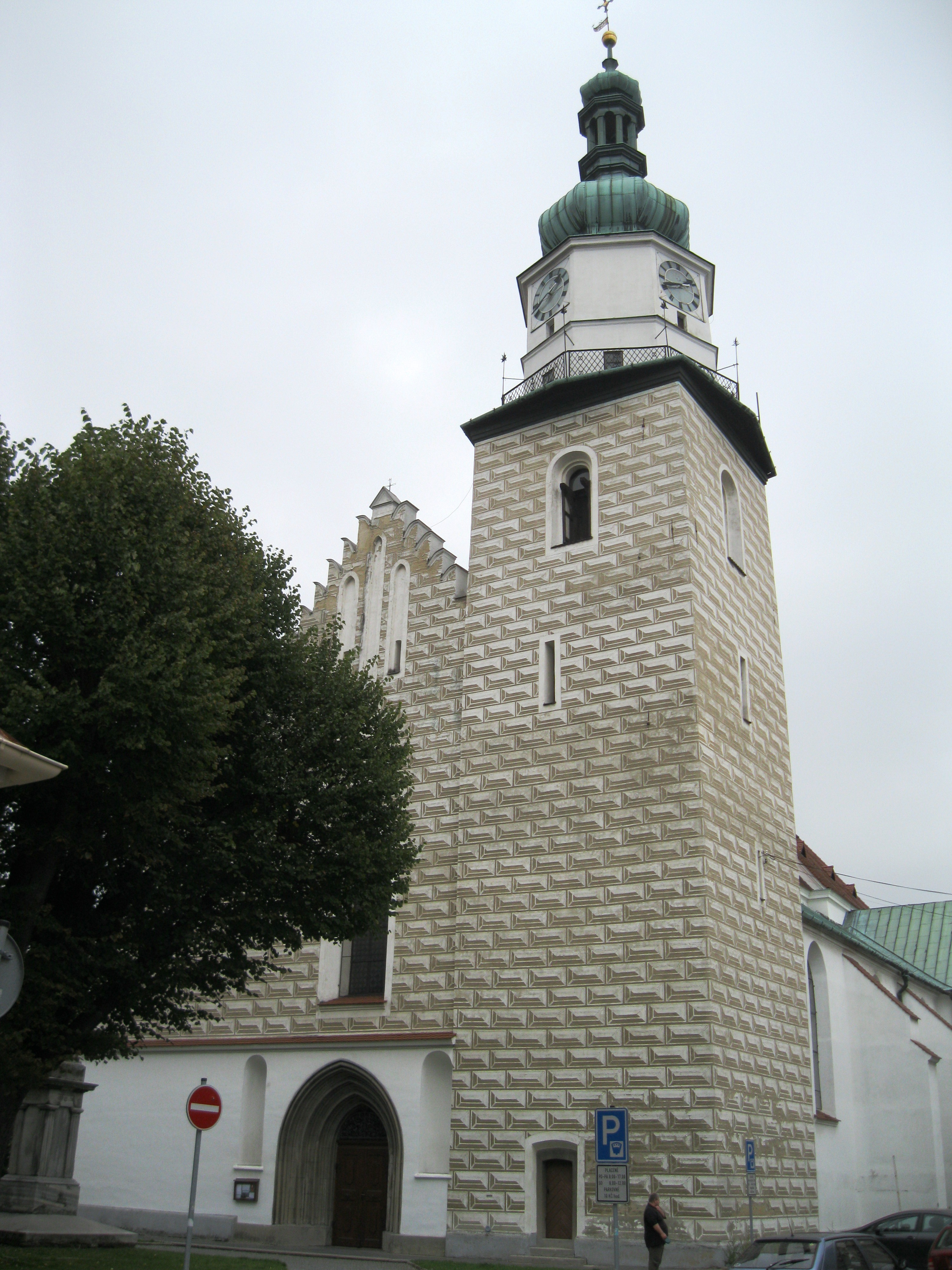
Church of the Assumption of the Virgin Mary

=== 13th–15th centuries ===
The first written mention of Bruntál is in the Uničov charter, issued by King Ottokar I in 1223. According to the charter, Bruntál was founded probably by Vladislaus Henry around 1213 and granted Magdeburg rights. Being the first settlement in Czech lands to be granted Magdeburg rights, Bruntál was an appellate court for all cities endowed with Magdeburg rights in Northern Moravia (including Olomouc and Opava) until 1352. The reasons behind the founding of the town probably included utilising mineral ore deposits in the region, as well as thwarting colonisation by the Bishops of Wrocław.

Bruntál was founded as a mining town and the mining of precious metals and later iron ore in its vicinity was the main source of its prosperity until the 17th century. This fact was also reflected in the coat of arms, which already contains the figure of a miner in its oldest known image on a document from 1287. In addition to mining the town's economic growth was aided by its location on a trade route and the development of crafts.

Bruntál was owned by various branches of the Přemyslid dynasty almost continuously until 1474. It was owned by the Margraves of Moravia in 1213–1318, by the Dukes of Opava in 1318–1377, and by the Dukes of Krnov in 1377–1474 except for the years 1384–1390, when it was owned by Vladislaus II of Opole.

In 1474, during the Bohemian–Hungarian War (1468–1478), Bruntál was occupied by the armed forces of Matthias Corvinus who gave the town as a pledge to his supporter, Jan of Vrbno. Despite being only a possessor of the town, Jan of Vrbno started to style himself "of Vrbno and Bruntál" from 1476 onwards.

=== 16th century ===
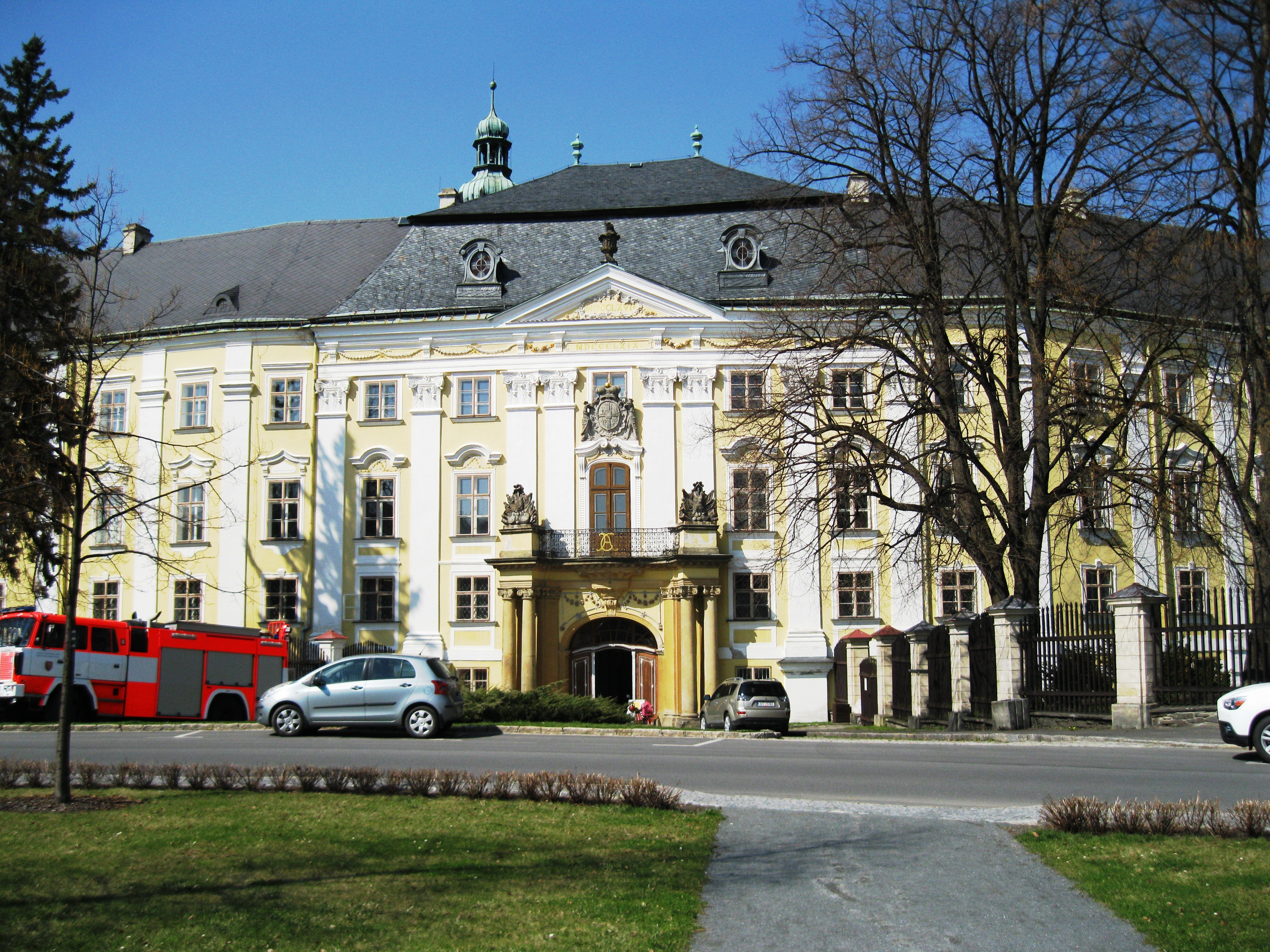
Bruntál Castle

Sons of Jan of Vrbno and Bruntál (Bernard, Hynek, and Mikuláš) managed to secure an allodial title (ownership) to the town together with neighbouring villages and mines from the Dukes of Krnov in 1506 and established the Bruntál estate. The Lords of Vrbno and Bruntál were steadily stripping the town of its privileges and forced local inhabitants into corvée labour and religious conversion to Lutheranism. These encroachments upon town privileges and the liberties of its citizens resulted in an unsuccessful rebellion against Jan the Elder of Vrbno and Bruntál in 1556.

Despite political decline Bruntál's economy flourished under the reigns of the Lords of Vrbno and Bruntál. Thank to the privileges granted by Ferdinand II, Archduke of Austria in 1535 and 1558, and by Rudolf II in 1577, the town hosted several markets each year and new guilds emerged.

The expanded mining industry, backed by the Lords of Vrbno, led to the founding of several neighbouring towns, including Andělská Hora around 1550, and Vrbno pod Pradědem in 1611. During the 16th century, the character of the town changed as it was rebuilt in the Renaissance style and better fortified by building new bastions.

=== 17th–19th centuries ===
In 1621, the estate was confiscated from Jan IV of Vrbno and Bruntál for his participation in the Bohemian Revolt and given to the Teutonic Order. Forced re-Catholicisation took place in the following years. During the Thirty Years' War, the town was repeatedly looted and severely damaged, and was also hit by a fire in 1643 and by plague epidemics in 1633 and 1647. Bruntál recovered economically from the war damage during the rule of Johann Caspar von Ampringen, but lost its former importance and wealth.

During the 18th century several disasters befell the town, such as the plagues of 1714 and 1739, and the great fires of 1748 and 1764. Nevertheless, many new baroque buildings were built during this period and a new post office was established in 1748.

During the 19th century, industrialisation took place. In 1823–1826, the town fortifications were demolished, new public buildings were built, and many textile factories were established. Bruntál became the centre of textile industry of Czech Silesia. The railway was opened in 1872.

=== 20th century ===
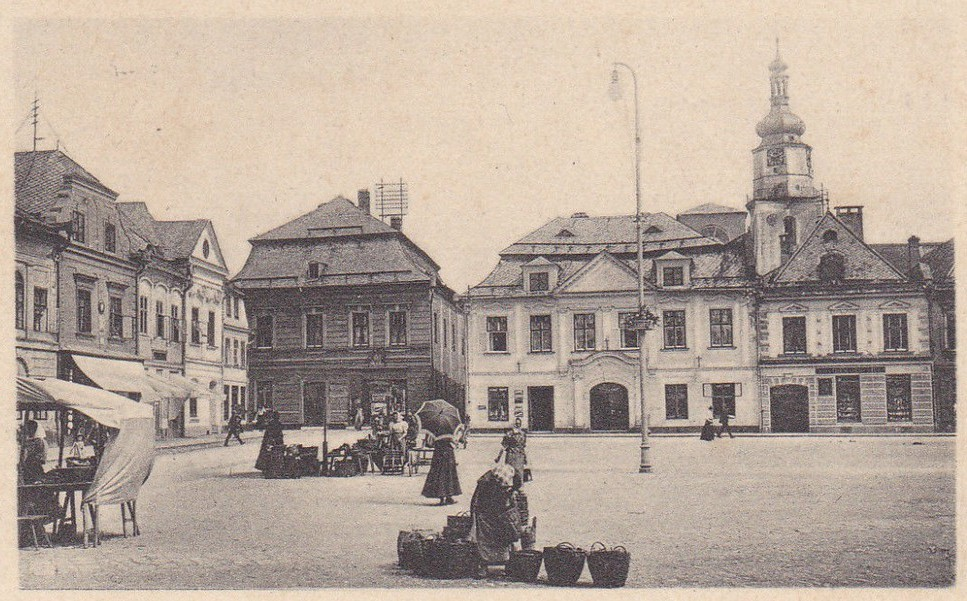
Náměstí Míru in the first half of the 20th century

According to the Austro-Hungarian census of 1910, the town had 8,066 inhabitants, out of which 7,939 (99.7%) were German-speaking. Jews were not allowed to declare Yiddish as their native language, thus most of them professed the German language. The most populous religious group was the Roman Catholics with 7,725 (95.8%), followed by the Protestants with 229 (2.8%), and the Jews with 97 (1.2%).

After World War I, Bruntál became part of the newly established Czechoslovakia, which led to riots by the German majority. Czech families began to come to the town and a large minority was gradually formed. German nationalism gained many sympathisers among German inhabitants of Bruntál, which was reflected in an attempted uprising in September 1938. After signing the Munich Agreement on 29 September 1938, Bruntál was occupied by Nazi Germany. From 1938 to 1945, it was part of the Reichsgau Sudetenland.

During World War II, the Germans operated a Gestapo prison in the town, the E339 and E352 forced labour subcamps of the Stalag VIII-B/344 prisoner-of-war camp, a forced labour camp for Jews, and a subcamp of the Auschwitz concentration camp for women.

The town was liberated by the Soviet Red Army on 7 May 1945, and then restored to Czechoslovakia. The German population was expelled in accordance to the Potsdam Agreement and the town was resettled by Czechs. In the 1950s, the textile industry ended and was replaced by new industrial enterprises.

== Demographics ==
As of 2026, the population is 14,791, of which 48.0% are male, and 52.0% are female. People under 15 years old make up 13.7% of the population, and people over 65 years old make up 23.4%.

Historical population

Year	Pop.	±%
1869	6,848	—
1880	7,895	+15.3%
1890	8,117	+2.8%
1900	8,060	−0.7%
1910	8,443	+4.8%

Year	Pop.	±%
1921	8,597	+1.8%
1930	9,905	+15.2%
1950	7,623	−23.0%
1961	7,987	+4.8%
1970	9,432	+18.1%

Year	Pop.	±%
1980	13,847	+46.8%
1991	16,633	+20.1%
2001	17,454	+4.9%
2011	16,530	−5.3%
2021	14,936	−9.6%

Source: Censuses (Note: Excluding Kunov, which was part of Bruntál until 2019.)

=== 2021 census ===
As of the 2021 census, 4.6% of the population was born in another country, and 1.5% has foreign citizenship – 0.4% has Slovak, 0.4% Ukrainian, 0.1% Polish, 0.1% Vietnamese, and 0.4% other citizenship.

As of the 2021 census, 93.6% of the population has Czech as their mother tongue, 1.4% Slovak, 0.2% Polish, 0.2% Russian, 0.2% Ukrainian, 0.1% Vietnamese, and 4.3% other languages.

As of the 2021 census, 26.2% of the population is religious, of which 23.6% belong to the Roman Catholic Church, 1.2% to the Czechoslovak Hussite Church, and 0.6% to the Evangelical United Brethren Church, and 52.6% do not belong to a church or religious society. Another 73.8% of the population is irreligious.

== Economy ==
The largest employers with the headquarters in the town are the Czech branch of the Osram company (a manufacturer of electric lights) and Macco Organiques (producer of mineral salts), both with more than 250 employees.

== Transport ==
Bus station

Bruntál lies at the crossroads of two main roads: the I/11 (the section from Opava to Šumperk) and the I/45 (connecting Krnov with Olomouc District).

Bruntál is located on the railway line Ostrava–Olomouc.

== Education ==
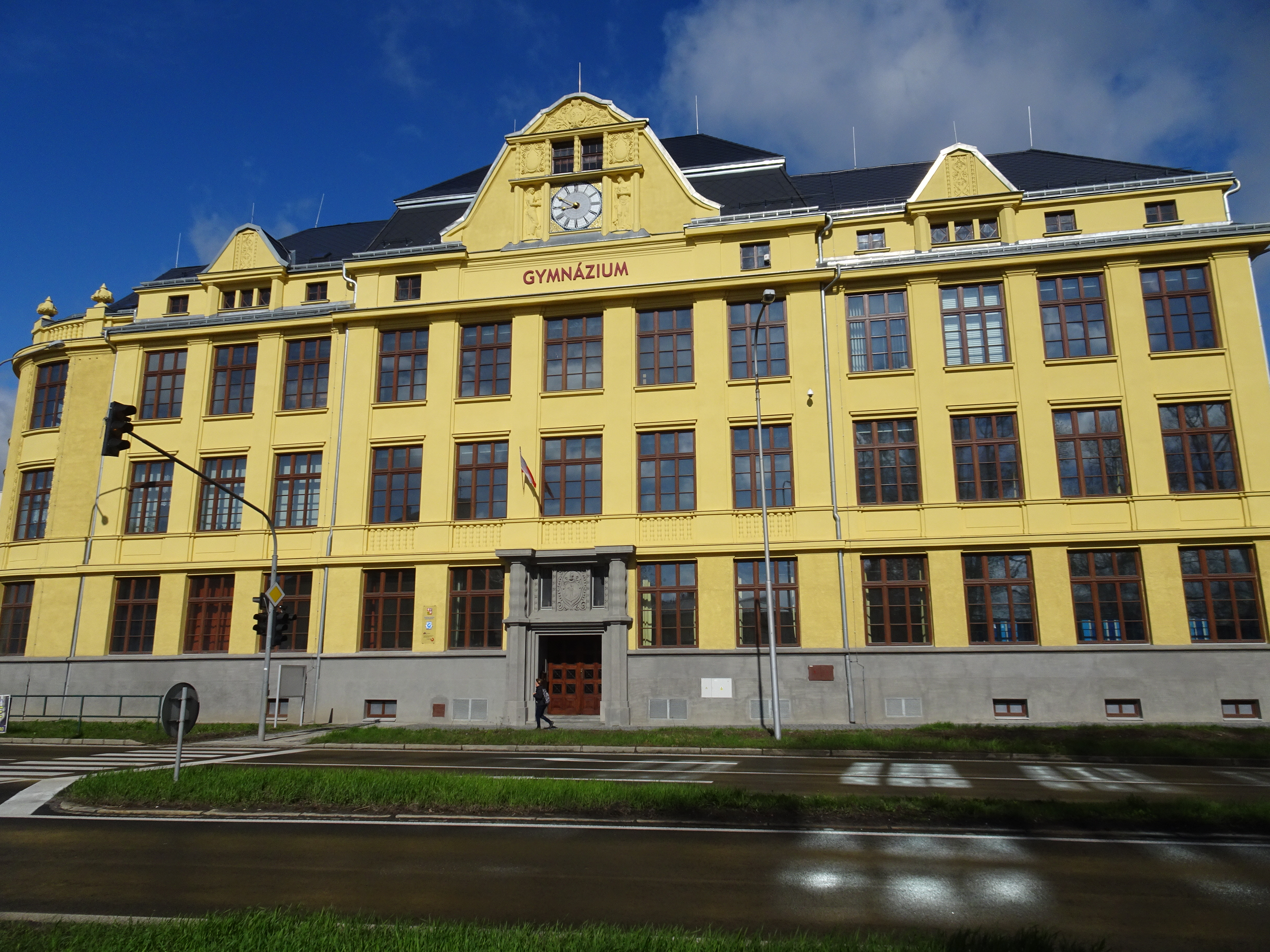
General and Sports Gymnasium

There are five kindergartens, six primary schools (including one special primary school for children with intellectual disability), and three high schools. Art education is provided by the primary art school.

Another educational facility is the Leisure Time Centre. This facility is aimed at providing various leisure activities for children of all ages and adults. The sorts of activities offered by the Leisure Time Centre vary from sports (belly dancing, volleyball, gymnastics, etc.) to pottery or playing musical instruments.

== Sights ==
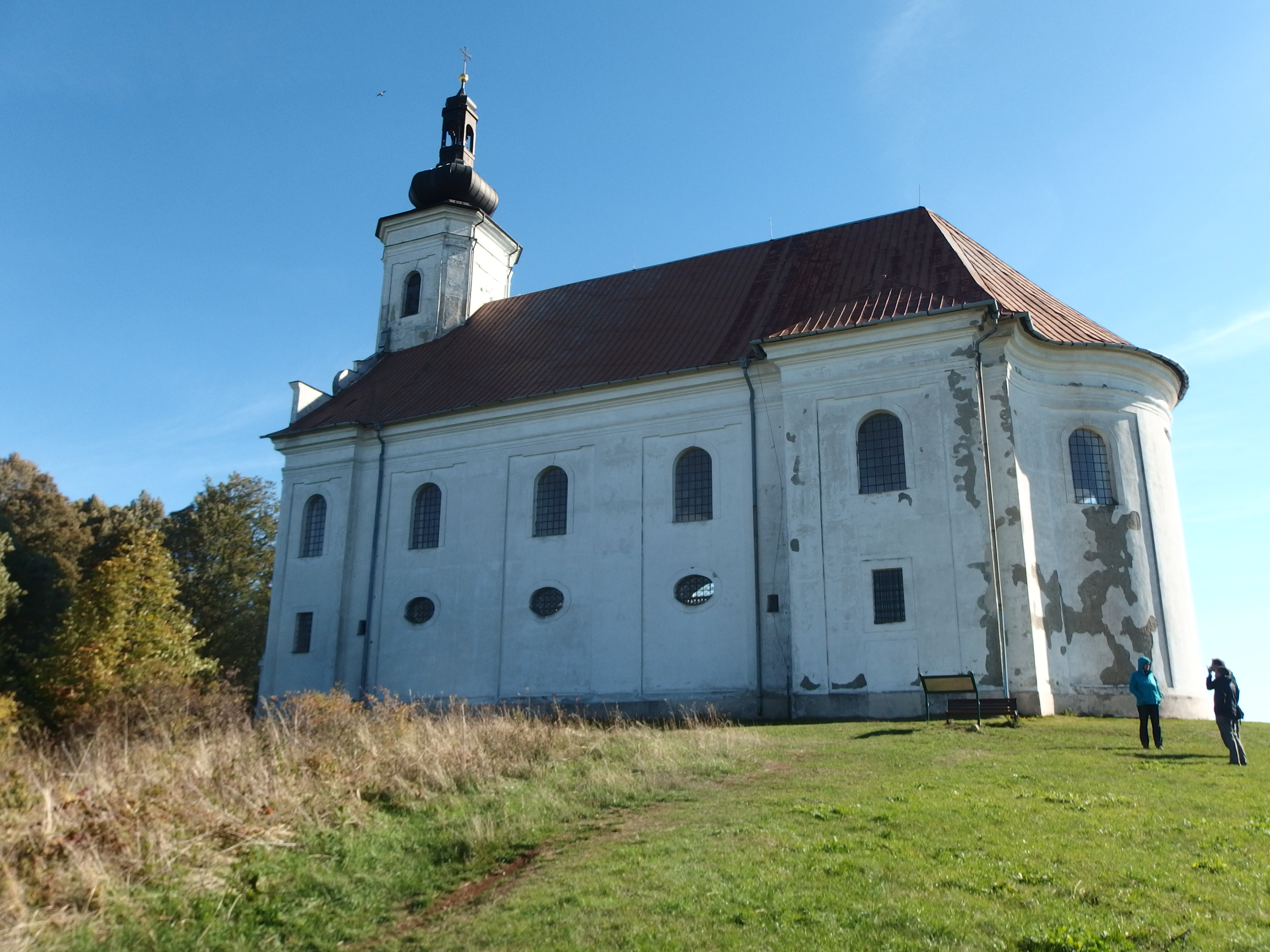
Church of Our Lady of Help

The most important monument is Bruntál Castle. The original Gothic fortress from the end of the 15th century was rebuilt into a Renaissance residence in the second half of the 16th century, and then rebuilt in the Baroque style in 1766–1769. It has an atypical floor plan with a triangular courtyard with arcades. The valuable equipment of the original interiors with a picture collection, armory and library has been preserved. Today the castle houses the regional museum and its premises are also used for cultural and social events.

The castle includes a castle park from the 16th century, on an area of more than 2.5 hectares (6.2 acres). In the park there are the remains of the town fortifications, a salla terrena from 1894, and eleven sandstone sculptures from the turn of the 18th and 19th centuries.

The parish Church of the Assumption of the Virgin Mary dates from the second half of the 13th century. In 1729–1731, two chapels were added. The church was reconstructed in the Baroque style after the fires in 1749 and 1764, and the tower was raised.

The former Piarist monastery with the Church of Our Lady of Consolation was built in 1731–1752. Today it is used by the Orthodox Church.

The pilgrimage Church of Our Lady of Help is located on Uhlířský vrch. It is a large Baroque church built in 1755–1758, which replaced an old wooden chapel from 1654. A wide linden alley planted in 1770 leads to it, which is today a protected cultural monument.

== Notable people ==
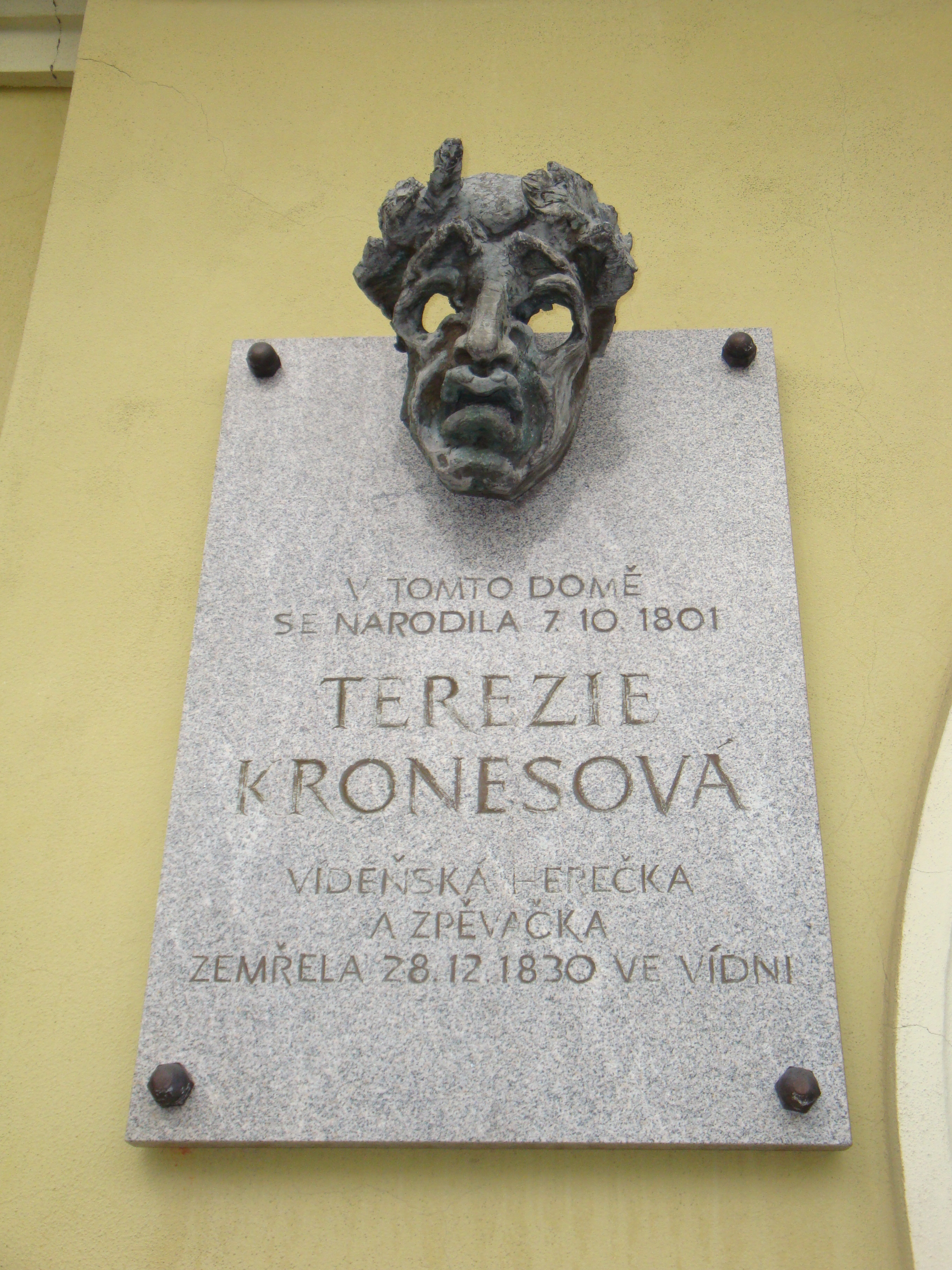
Therese Krones memorial plate

- Johann Christoph Handke (1694–1774), painter; lived here in 1708–1713
- Therese Krones (1801–1830), Austrian actress
- Irena Anders (1920–2010), Polish-Ukrainian actress
- Sigfried Held (born 1942), German football player
- Jitka Chalánková (born 1957), politician
- Iva Bittová (born 1958), avant-garde violinist, singer, composer
- Oldřich Machala (born 1963), football player and manager
- Leo Gudas (born 1965), ice hockey player
- Martin Lukeš (born 1978), football player
- Hana Machová (born 1979), basketball player

== Twin towns – sister cities ==
Bruntál is twinned with:

- Büdingen, Germany
- Castellarano, Italy
- Opole, Poland
- Plungė, Lithuania
- Štúrovo, Slovakia
