= Hans-Josef Klauck =

German theologian (1946–2025)

Hans-Josef Klauck OFM
- Klauck in 2011
- Born: 4 June 1946; Hermeskeil, Germany
- Died: 27 March 2025 (aged 78); Munich, Bavaria, Germany
- Title: Naomi Shenstone Donnelley Professor Emeritus of New Testament and Early Christian Literature

Academic background
- Education: LMU Munich
- Thesis: (1977)
- Doctoral advisor: Joachim Gnilka

Academic work
- Discipline: Theology; New Testament
- Institutions: University of Chicago Divinity School

Hans-Josef Klauck OFM (4 June 1946 – 27 March 2025) was a German theologian, Franciscan priest, and historian. After teaching New Testament as professor at the University of Bonn, the University of Würzburg and LMU Munich, he was Naomi Shenstone Donnelley Professor Emeritus of New Testament and Early Christian Literature at the University of Chicago Divinity School from 2001 to 2016.

== Life and career ==
Klauck was born in Hermeskeil on 4 June 1946. The first child of his mother, Anna-Maria Meier, he grew up with two younger half-brothers. He attended the boarding school of the Franciscan Cologne region in Exaten near Roermond from 1960 where he achieved the Abitur in 1966. He then joined the Franciscan Rietberg Abbey on 21 April 1966. He made his vows on 5 October 1970. Klauck studied philosophy and theology at the University of Münster and the University of Bonn. He was ordained a priest on 15 July 1972 by Bishop Heinrich Tenhumberg in Münster.

Klauck worked in the St. Pankratius parish in Buldern and studied further in Münster, focused on Bible and Jewish studies. He worked as an assistant to Joachim Gnilka at LMU Munich and achieved the doctorate of theology in 1977; his dissertation was titled "Allegorie und Allegorese in synoptischen Gleichnistexten". He was habilitated in 1980, writing about "Herrenmahl und hellenistischer Kult. Eine religionsgeschichtliche Untersuchung zum ersten Korintherbrief".

Klauck was appointed professor in Bonn in 1981. He received an offer from the University of Würzburg the following year to succeed Rudolf Schnackenburg. In 1994 he lectured in South Africa for several weeks. He served as dean of the faculty in Würzburg from 1995 to 1997. In 1998, he moved to the faculty of Catholic theology in Munich, succeeding his former teacher Gnilka.

Klauck received an offer to teach New Testament at the University of Chicago Divinity School in 2001, a private institution independent of denominations and churches. Klauck was president of the Studiorum Novi Testamenti Societas in 2003/04. He received an honorary doctorate from the University of Zurich in 2008, for his studies of Early Christianity. He retired from the Divinity School in Summer 2016 as emeritus.

Klauck returned to Germany in 2022 and settled in a convent in Munich.

Klauck died in Munich on 27 March 2025, at the age of 78.

== Research ==
Hans-Josef Klauck was a prolific New Testament scholar of his time who worked on topics such as the parables of Jesus, Paul's Epistles to the Corinthians, and the Johannine epistles. He also focused on the social and religious history of the Greco-Roman world for context. He explored the apocrypha of the New Testament, writing introductions in several languages, and collected essays and articles in monographies.

Klauck was the editor of Herders Biblische Studien and Stuttgarter Biblische Studien; coeditor of Hermeneia, Evangelische-Katholische Kommentar zum Neuen Testament and Wissenschaftliche Untersuchungen zum Neuen Testament; New Testament area editor for the new edition of Die Religion in Geschichte und Gegenwart; and the main New Testament editor of the Encyclopedia of the Bible and Its Reception.

=== Books ===
Klauck authored over thirty books and over 250 articles. His books, several of them in English, include:

- Klauck, Hans-Josef (2000). The Religious Context of Early Christianity: A Guide to Graeco-Roman Religions. Studies of the New Testament and its World. Edinburgh: T & T Clark. ISBN 978-0-567-08693-8. OCLC 59430516.
- ——— (2000). Magic and Paganism in Early Christianity: The World of the Acts of the Apostles. Edinburgh, Scotland: T & T Clark. ISBN 978-0-567-08749-2. OCLC 44737102.
- ——— (2000). Dion von Prusa: Olympische Rede oder über die erste Erkenntnis Gottes. Darmstadt: Wissenschaftliche Buchgesellschaft. ISBN 9783534149476. OCLC 45541463.
- ——— (2002). Apokryphe Evangelien: Eine Einführung. Stuttgart: Verlag Katholisches Bibelwerk. ISBN 978-3-460-33022-1. OCLC 50994826.
- ——— (2002). Anknüpfung und Widerspruch. Das frühe Christentum in der multireligiösen Welt der Antike. Munich: Katholische Akademie in Bayern. ISBN 9783926512994. OCLC 52299722.
- ——— (2003). Religion und Gesellschaft im frühen Christentum. Neutestamentliche Studien. Wissenschaftliche Untersuchungen zum Neuen Testament. Vol. 152. Tübingen: Mohr Siebeck. ISBN 978-3-16-147899-4. OCLC 51770649.
- ——— (2003). Apocryphal gospels : an introduction. New York: T & T Clark International. ISBN 978-0-567-08390-6. OCLC 727069158.
- ——— (2006). Ancient Letter Writing and the New Testament: A Guide to Context and Exegesis. Waco, TX: Baylor University Press. ISBN 978-1-4294-1839-3. OCLC 77011211.
- ——— (2008). Die apokryphe Bibel. Ein anderer Zugang zum frühen Christentum. Tria corda. Vol. 4. Tübingen: Mohr Siebeck. ISBN 978-3-16-149686-8. OCLC 939245533.
