= Wolfgang Nastainczyk =

German theologian and priest (1932–2019)

- Dean Emeritus of the University of Regensburg
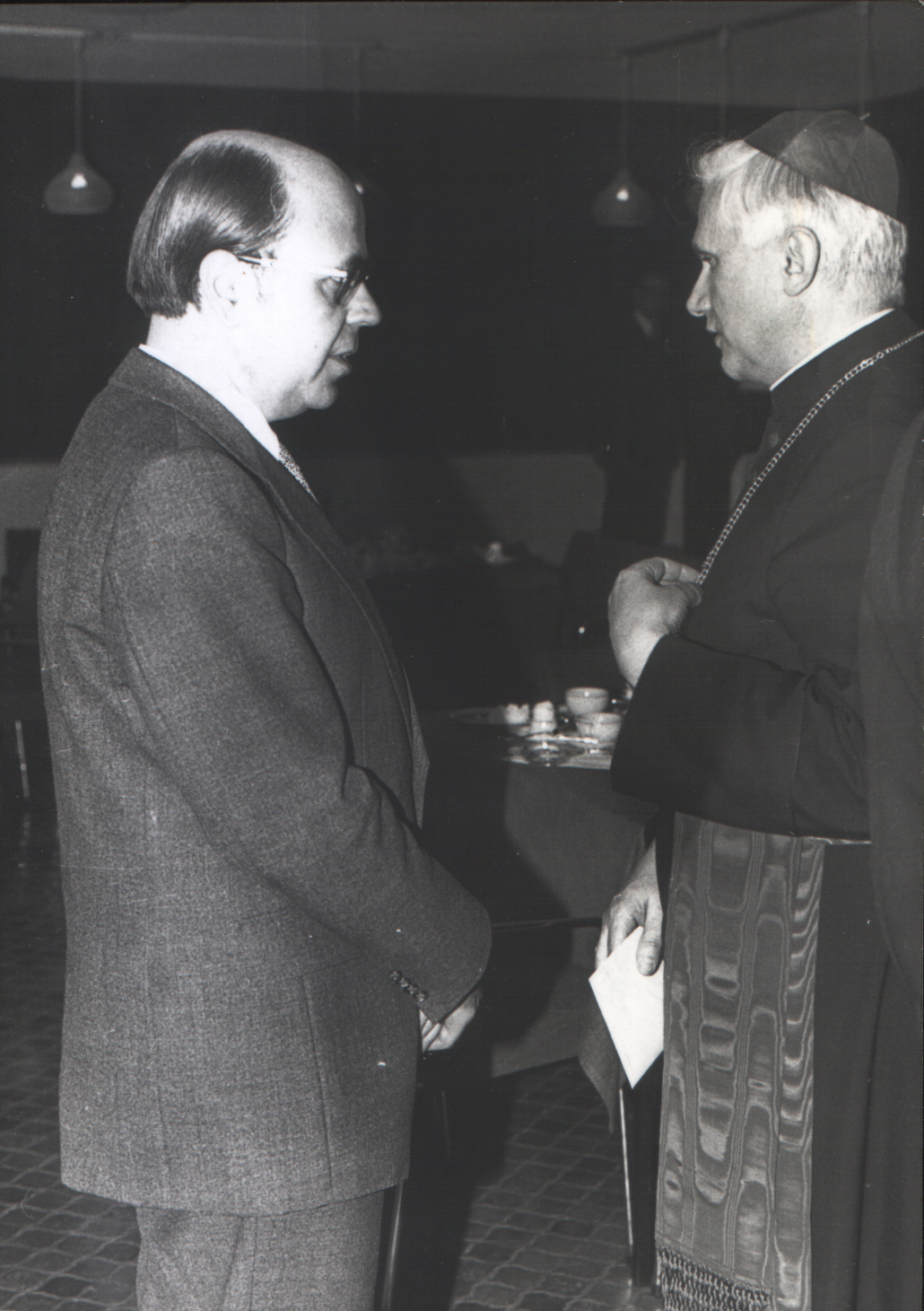
- Nastainczyk (left) with Joseph Ratzinger (later Pope Benedict XVI) c. 1977.
- Diocese: Regensburg

Orders
- Ordination: 9 June 1957

Personal details
- Born: Wolfgang Hermann Heinrich Nastainczyk; 1 January 1932 Leobschütz, Upper Silesia, Weimar Germany
- Died: 13 December 2019 (aged 87) Regensburg
- Denomination: Roman Catholic
- Residence: Regensburg, Germany

Wolfgang Nastainczyk (1 January 1932 – 13 December 2019) was a German theologian, lecturer and priest who taught at the University of Regensburg alongside Joseph Ratzinger (now Pope Benedict XVI). He was the cousin of German theologian, Johannes Tenzler. Nastainczyk was born in Leobschütz, Upper Silesia, the son of Josef Nastainczyk and Gertrud Tenzler and was ordained a Roman Catholic priest on 9 June 1957.

On 5 April 2011, Nastainczyk published a complete history of Christianity in Silesia entitled Wie die Schlesier Christen wurden, waren und sind: Ein Beitrag zur schlesischen Kulturgeschichte. This book took Nastainczyk ten years to research and write and begins its history in the year 950AD. The book also discusses relations between Christians and Jews in the area throughout history and the impacts of Nazism, the Second World War and the Anschluß on the region.

== Works ==
- Nastainczyk, Wolfgang (1979). Religion unterrichten Aufgaben u. Möglichkeiten, neu gesehen (in German). Freiburg im Breisgau, Basel, Wien: Herder. ISBN 978-3-451-18249-5. OCLC 214254113.
- Ehelosigkeit des Priesters in Geschichte und Gegenwart (1970)
- In Freude vor Gott Pfeiffer, 1963
- Nastainczyk, Wolfgang (2011). Wie die Schlesier Christen wurden, waren und sind : ein Beitrag zur schlesischen Kulturgeschichte (in German). Regensburg: Schnell + Steiner. ISBN 978-3-7954-2468-8. OCLC 719414063.
