= Głubczyce Town Hall =

Coordinates: 50.2000°N 17.8303°E

Ratusz w Głubczycach Głubczyce Town Hall
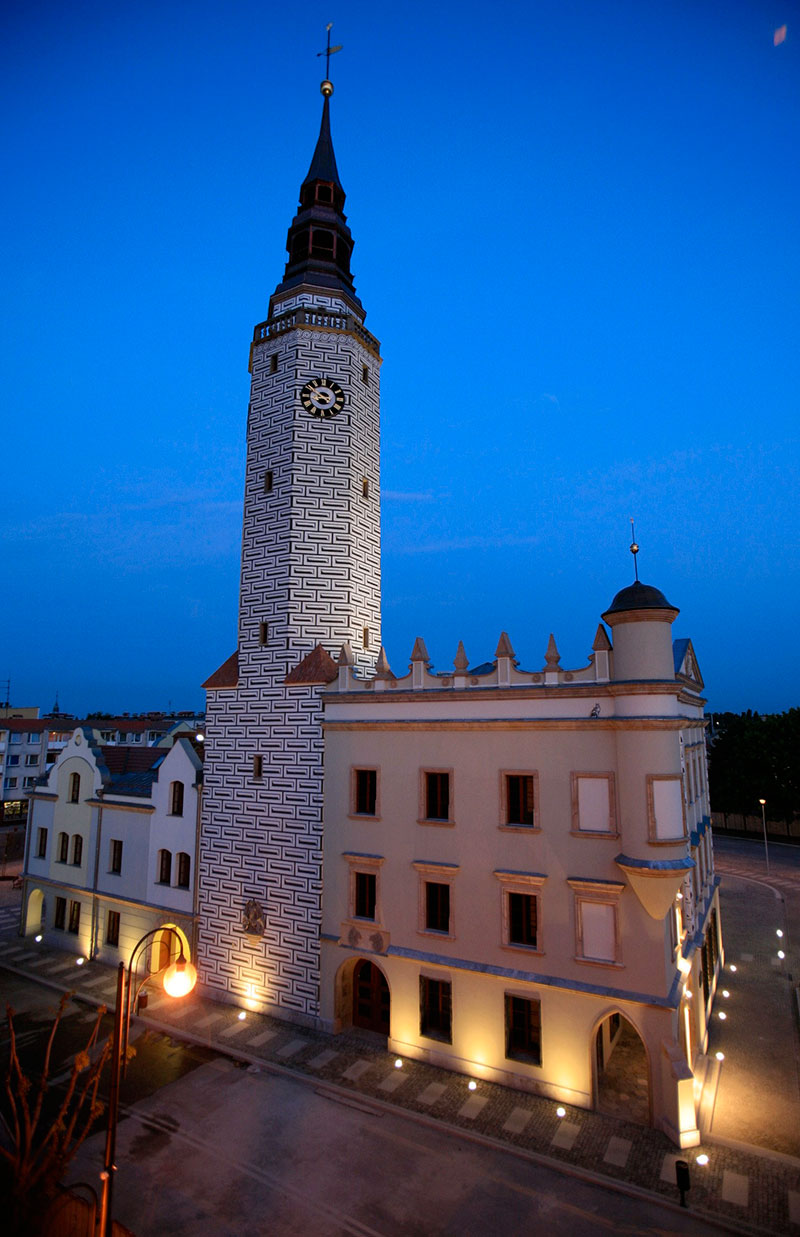
- Głubczyce Town Hall
- Interactive map of the Ratusz w Głubczycach; Głubczyce Town Hall area

General information
- Type: Town hall
- Architectural style: Renaissance
- Location: Głubczyce, Poland
- Construction started: 1570
- Completed: 1863-1864, 1936

Głubczyce Town Hall - a Renaissance building in Głubczyce, Głubczyce County, Opole Voivodeship; in Poland. The first mention of a town hall in Głubczyce was in 1383, when a thirteenth-century townhouse was reconstructed into the town hall. The town hall's Renaissance architectural style structure and attic style was built in 1570. Reconstructions in the years of 1863-1864 and 1936, gave the building its Neo-Gothic architectural style. The town hall's decorative statues and towers were built in the nineteenth century. The town hall was renovated in 2006, partly funded by the European Union.
