= Church of the Nativity of the Blessed Virgin Mary, Głubczyce =

Coordinates: 50.1206°N 17.4944°E

Church of the Nativity of the Blessed Virgin Mary
- Kościół Narodzenia Najświętszej Maryi Panny
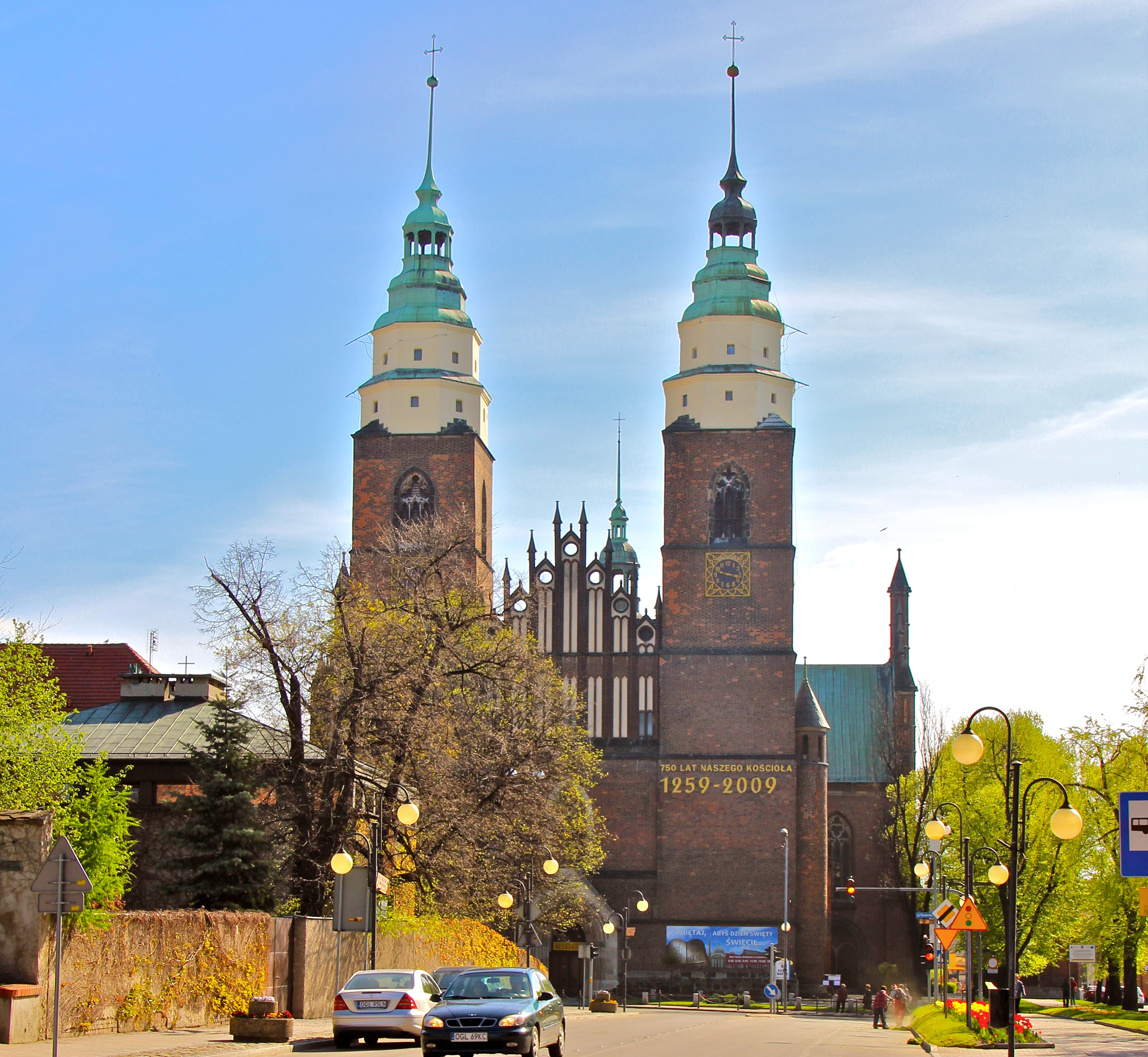
- Holy Trinity Church
- Church of the Nativity of the Blessed Virgin Mary
- Location: Głubczyce
- Country: Poland
- Denomination: Roman Catholic

History
- Founder: Henryk Henschl

Architecture
- Architectural type: Gothic
- Groundbreaking: 1240
- Completed: 1903-1907

Specifications
- Materials: Brick

Administration
- Diocese: Roman Catholic Diocese of Opole

The Church of the Nativity of the Blessed Virgin Mary in Głubczyce, Poland, is a Gothic brick church, part of the Roman Catholic Diocese of Opole.

The church was built in 1240 and further expanded in the fourteenth century, as well as in between 1903 and 1907 by architect Max Hasak. The present interior of the church originates from the 1903–1907 building work. The church contains a plethora of architectural distinctiveness, such as the southern frontal Baroque-topped tower, three early-Gothic stone portals from the thirteenth century and a transept crosswise nave.
