= Moritz Schulz =

German sculptor (1825–1904)

Moritz Schulz (4 November 1825 in Leobschütz, Upper Silesia – 1904) was a German sculptor.

== Biography ==
He studied at the Industrial School in Posen, at the Prussian Academy of Arts, and as a pupil of Friedrich Drake. From 1854 to 1870, he lived in Rome, studying the old masters and executing numerous works. Upon his return, he prepared for the Monument of Victory in the Königsplatz (now the Platz der Republik) of Berlin a bronze relief of the battle of Königgrätz. A series of decorations by him representing elementary instruction in the arts of painting and sculpture occupies a place in the entrance to the Alte Nationalgalerie (National Gallery) of Berlin, together with a frieze, 22 meters in length, depicting "The Triumph of the Artists," or the history of German art as displayed in its chief representatives. His further works include a statue of Frederick the Great for Thorn, and numerous subjects derived from allegory or classical mythology.

== Gallery ==
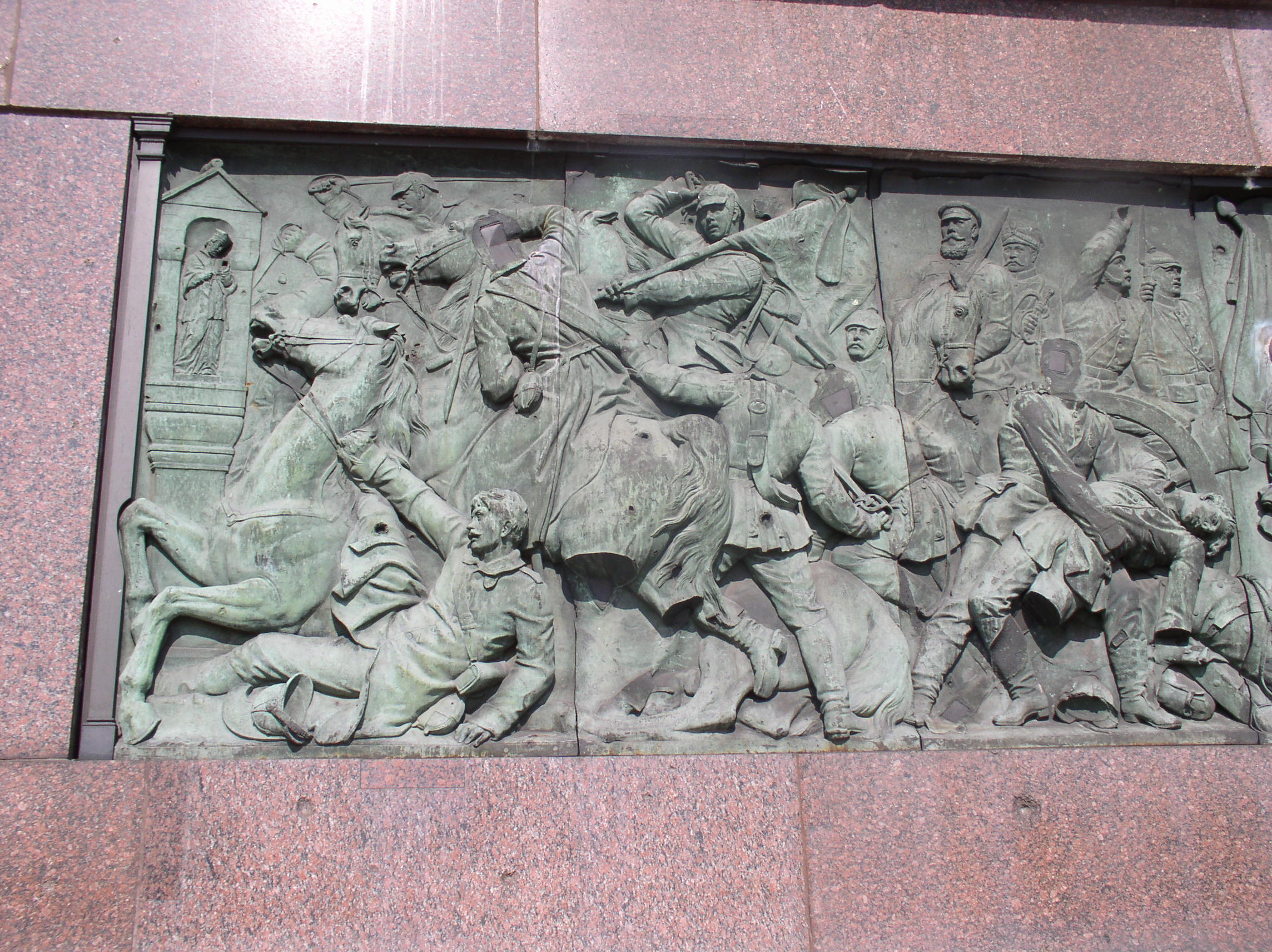

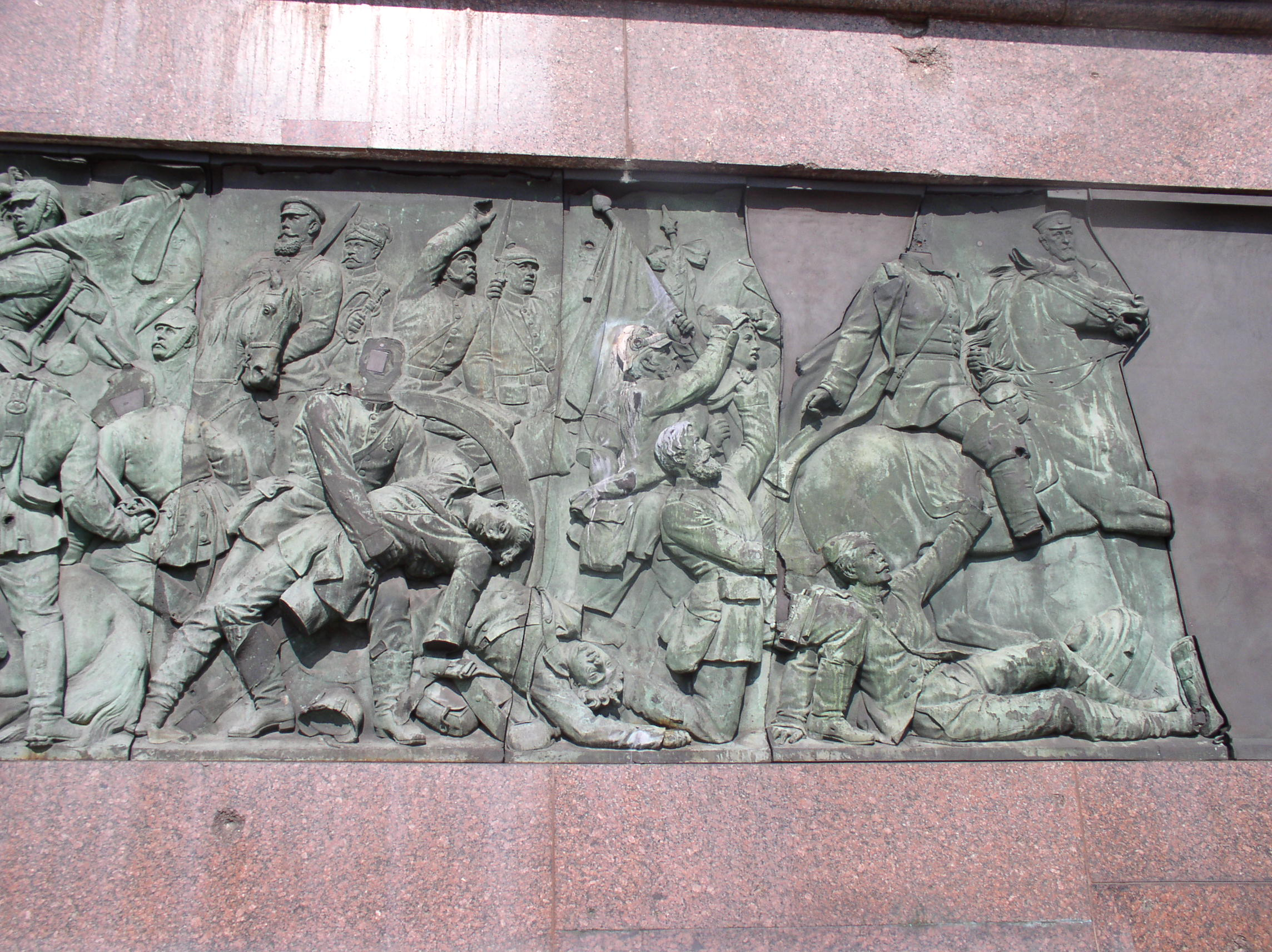

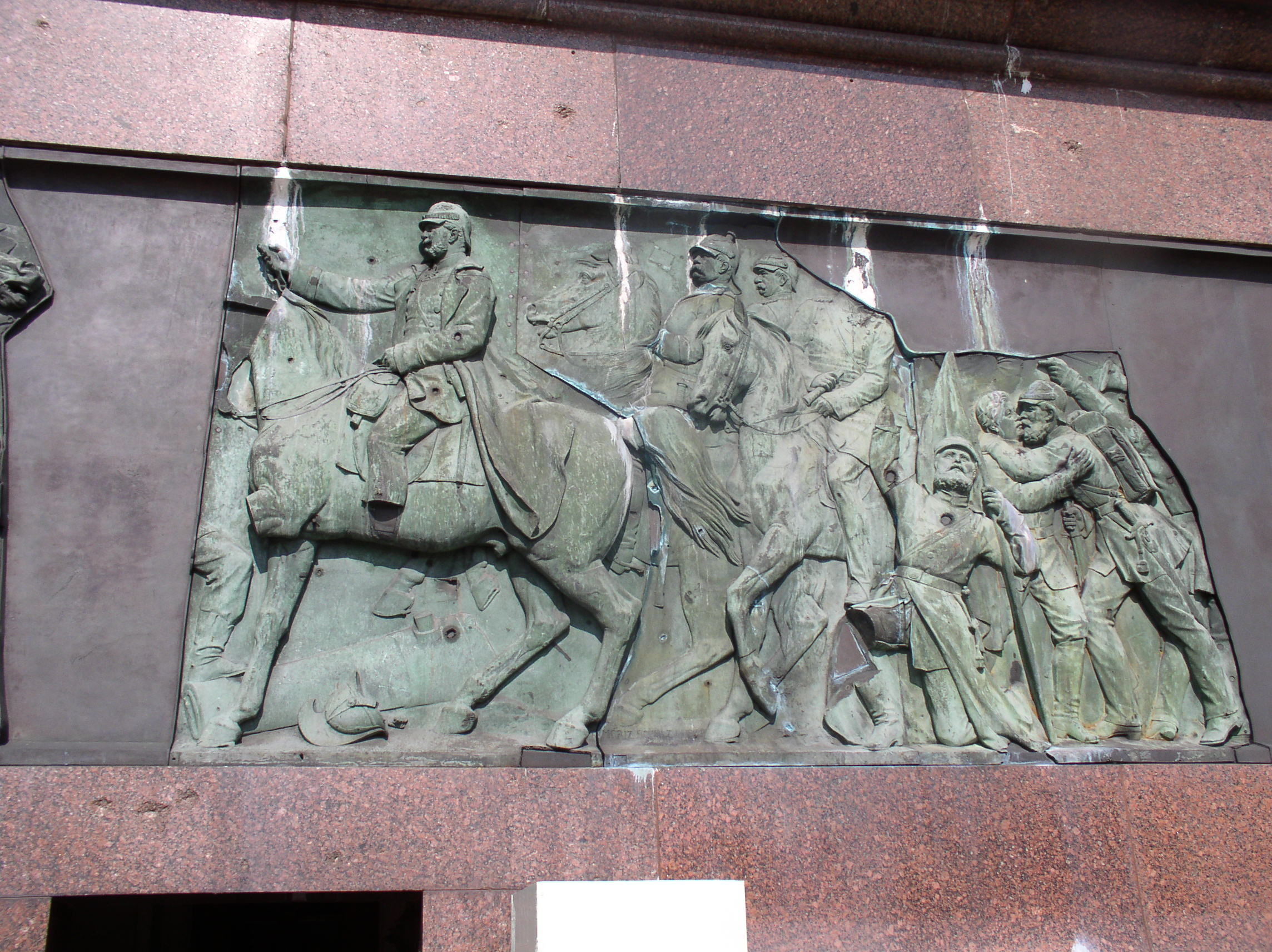

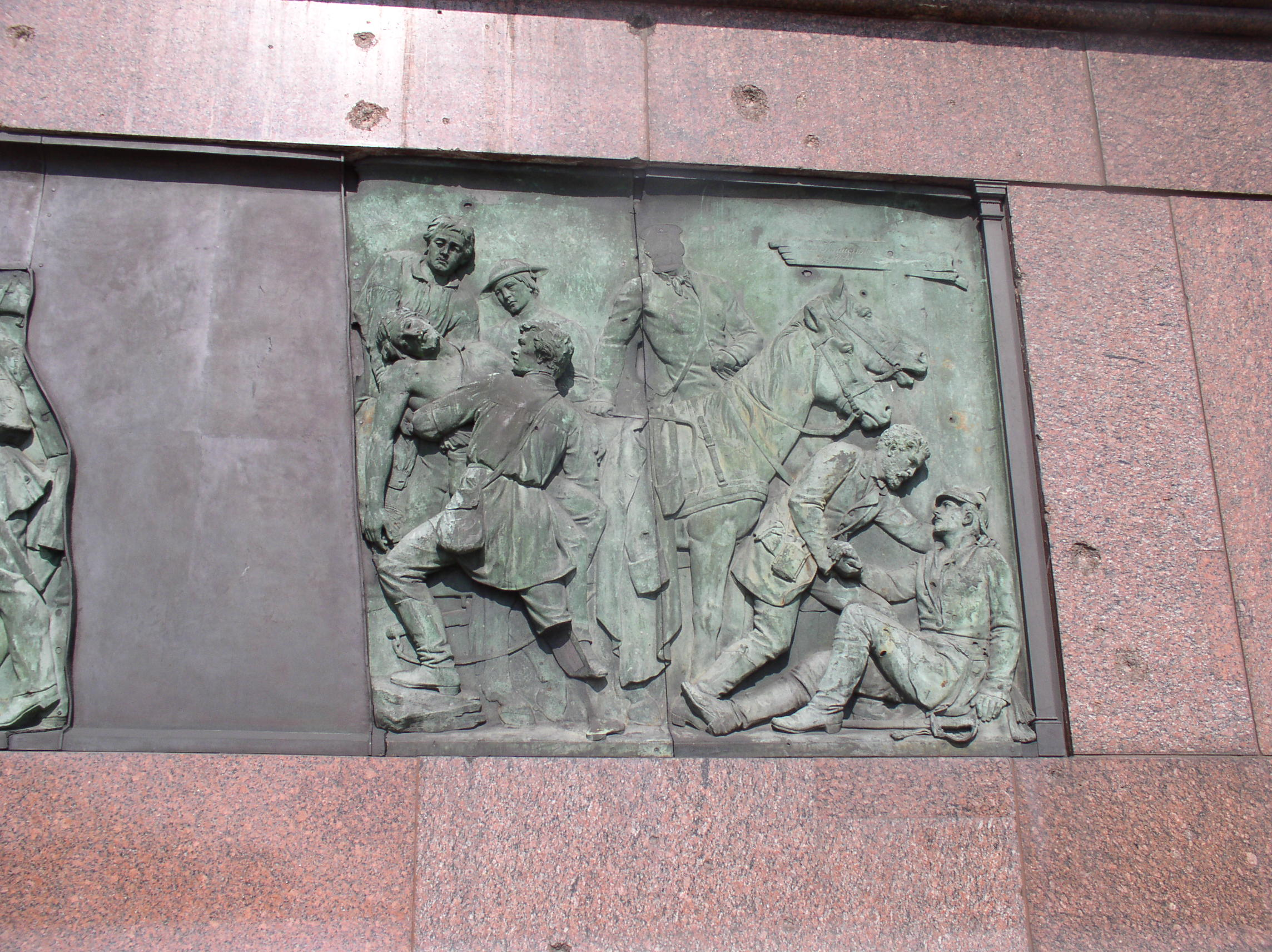

Victory column (Berlin): Relief 1866 – War against Austria, at the left is the Bohemian saint John of Nepomuk (pointing to the scene)
