= Gerhard Skrobek =

Gerhard Skrobek (May 22, 1922 – July 1, 2007) is best known as the premier artisan of Hummel figurines since the Second World War. Skrobek was born in Leobschütz, in Upper Silesia and studied art in Berlin. Skrobek worked for the Goebel company in Rödental, Germany between 1951 and 2002 and designed many of the figurines eagerly sought by collectors.
