= Racławice Śląskie =

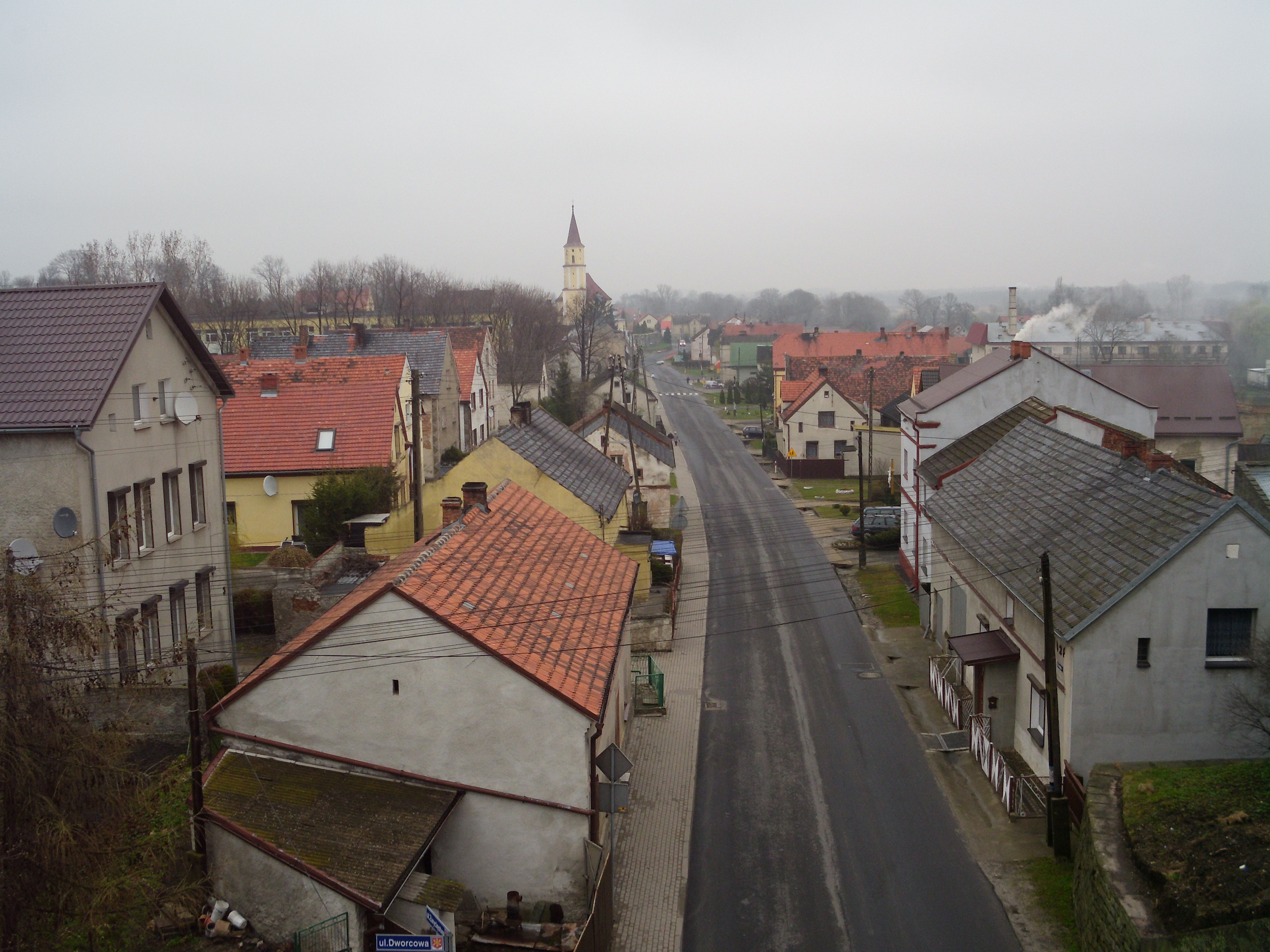
- Racławice Śląskie from a disused rail bridge

- Coat of arms

- Location within Poland
- Coordinates: 50°18′36″N 17°46′09″E
- Country: Poland
- Voivodeship: Opole
- County: Prudnik
- Gmina: Głogówek
- First mentioned: 1252

Population (2006)
  - Total: 1,600
- Time zone: UTC+1 (CET)
  - Summer (DST): UTC+2 (CEST)
- Area code: +48 77
- Vehicle registration: OPR

Racławice Śląskie (formerly Racławice Niemieckie; German: Deutsch Rasselwitz) is a village located in the Prudnik County, in the Opole Voivodeship, in southern Poland, near the border with the Czech Republic.

== History ==
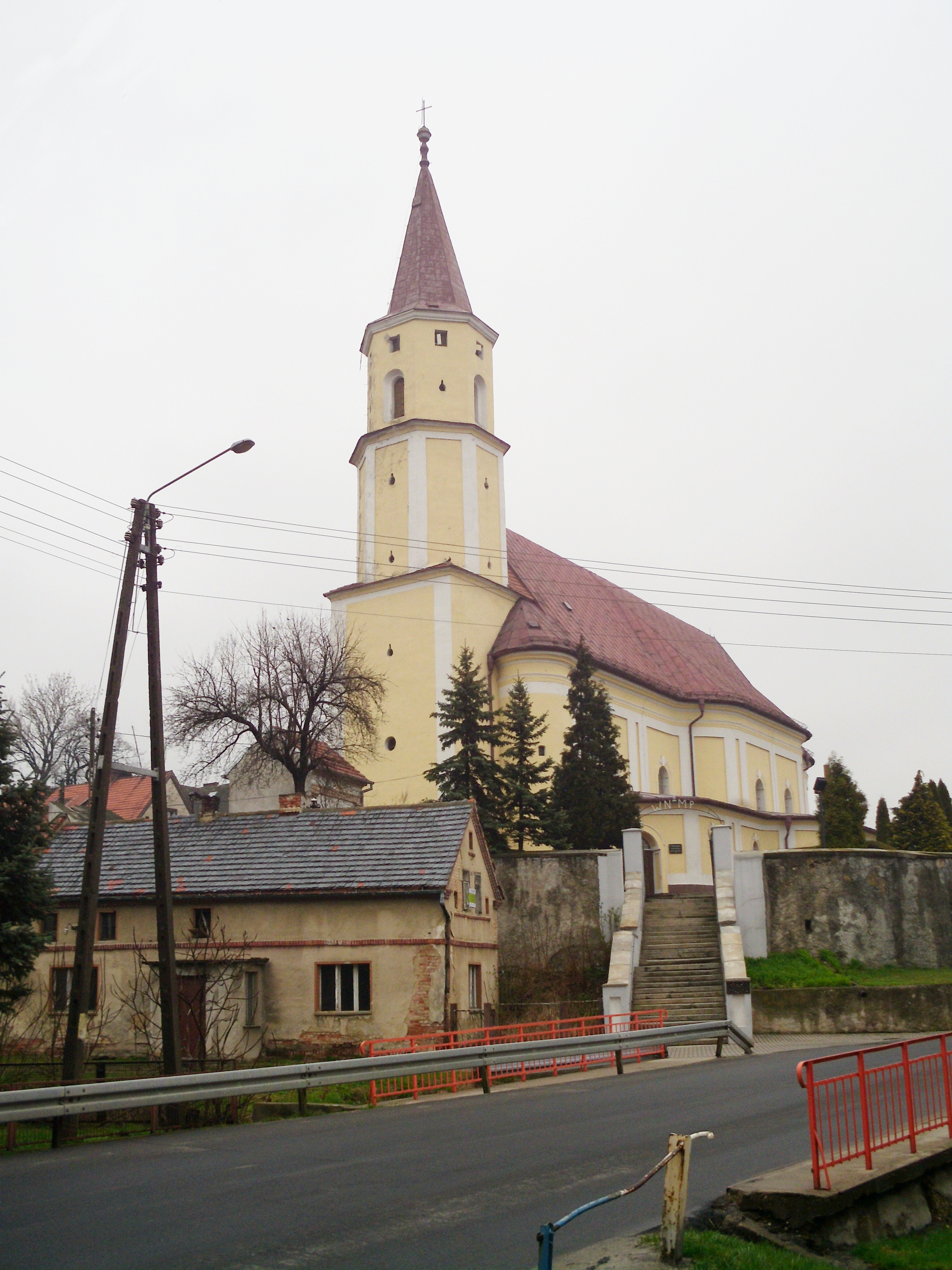
Baroque Saints Catherine and Barbara church

The name of the village is of Slavic origin, and comes from the first name of its Czech founder Racław or Razlav. The village was possibly devastated by Mongols retreating following the Battle of Legnica during the first Mongol invasion of Poland in 1241. The village was first mentioned in a document from 1252 as a possession of the Diocese of Olomouc. It formed part of the Kingdom of Bohemia, until it was sold to the Duchy of Niemodlin, a minor Upper Silesian duchy formed during the fragmentation of Poland into smaller duchies, by the Bohemian King in 1337, and later it passed to the Duchy of Opole, remaining under the rule of the Piast dynasty until 1532.

In 1861, the village had a population of 2,295. In the late 19th century, villagers who were not engaged in agriculture either worked as shoemakers or mostly emigrated for work to Congress Poland in the Russian Partition.

A local stone bridge was destroyed during a flood in 1903. A new steel bridge was built in the following years, and a water tower at the railway station was built in 1905.

On 3 May 1921, during the Third Silesian Uprising of Poles against German rule, a Polish insurgent unit led by Józef Siber attempted to blow up the bridge, leading to its damage. Some of the insurgents were subsequently captured by the Germans in Głubczyce.

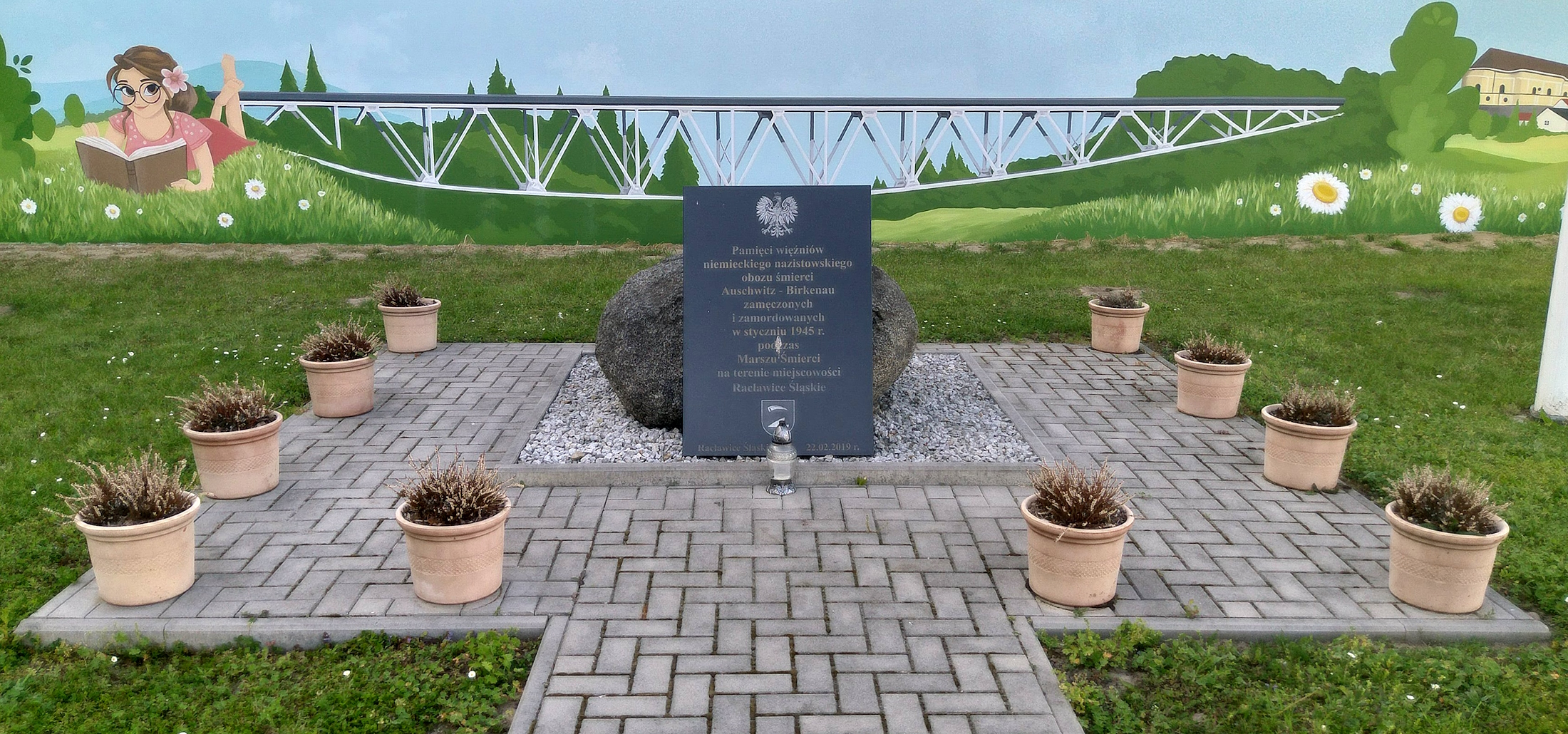
Memorial to the victims of the German-perpetrated death march

During the final stages of World War II, in January 1945, a German-perpetrated death march of prisoners of the Auschwitz concentration camp passed through the village. In March 1945, refugees passed through the village fleeing advancing Soviet troops. On 17 March 1945, an evacuation order was announced, however, some residents did not manage to escape before the Soviets arrived, and some were ordered to return to the village from German-occupied Czechoslovakia in May 1945. In total, 392 inhabitants of the village died in the war, including 231 soldiers and 161 civilians.

Most inhabitants are descendants of Poles expelled after 1945 from the area of Berezhany Raion in former eastern Poland annexed by the Soviet Union, who replaced the expelled Germans.

Until recently, Racławice was a rail junction, with trains leaving in three directions - towards Nysa, Kędzierzyn-Koźle and Głubczyce. Currently, the line Racławice-Głubczyce is closed.

== See also ==
- Prudnik Land
