= Wie die Schlesier Christen wurden, waren und sind =

Book by Wolfgang Nastainczyk

Wie die Schlesier Christen wurden, waren und sind: Ein Beitrag zur schlesischen Kulturgeschichte
- Author: Wolfgang Nastainczyk
- Language: German
- Subject: History of Christianity in Silesia
- Genre: History
- Publisher: Schnell & Steiner
- Publication date: 5 April 2011
- Publication place: Germany
- Pages: 276
- ISBN: 978-3-7954-2468-8

Wie die Schlesier Christen wurden, waren und sind: Ein Beitrag zur schlesischen Kulturgeschichte (How the Silesians Became, Were and Are Christians: A Contribution to Silesian Cultural History) is a 2011 book by German theologian Wolfgang Nastainczyk published by Schnell & Steiner. The book takes a look at the history of Christianity in Silesia from the year AD 950 to the present day and examines the effects history has had on the faith of Silesians over the years. Nastainczyk examines what impacts events such as the Crusades and Nazi Germany had on the region. It took him ten years to research and write.
