= Otfried Höffe =

German philosopher and professor (born 1943)

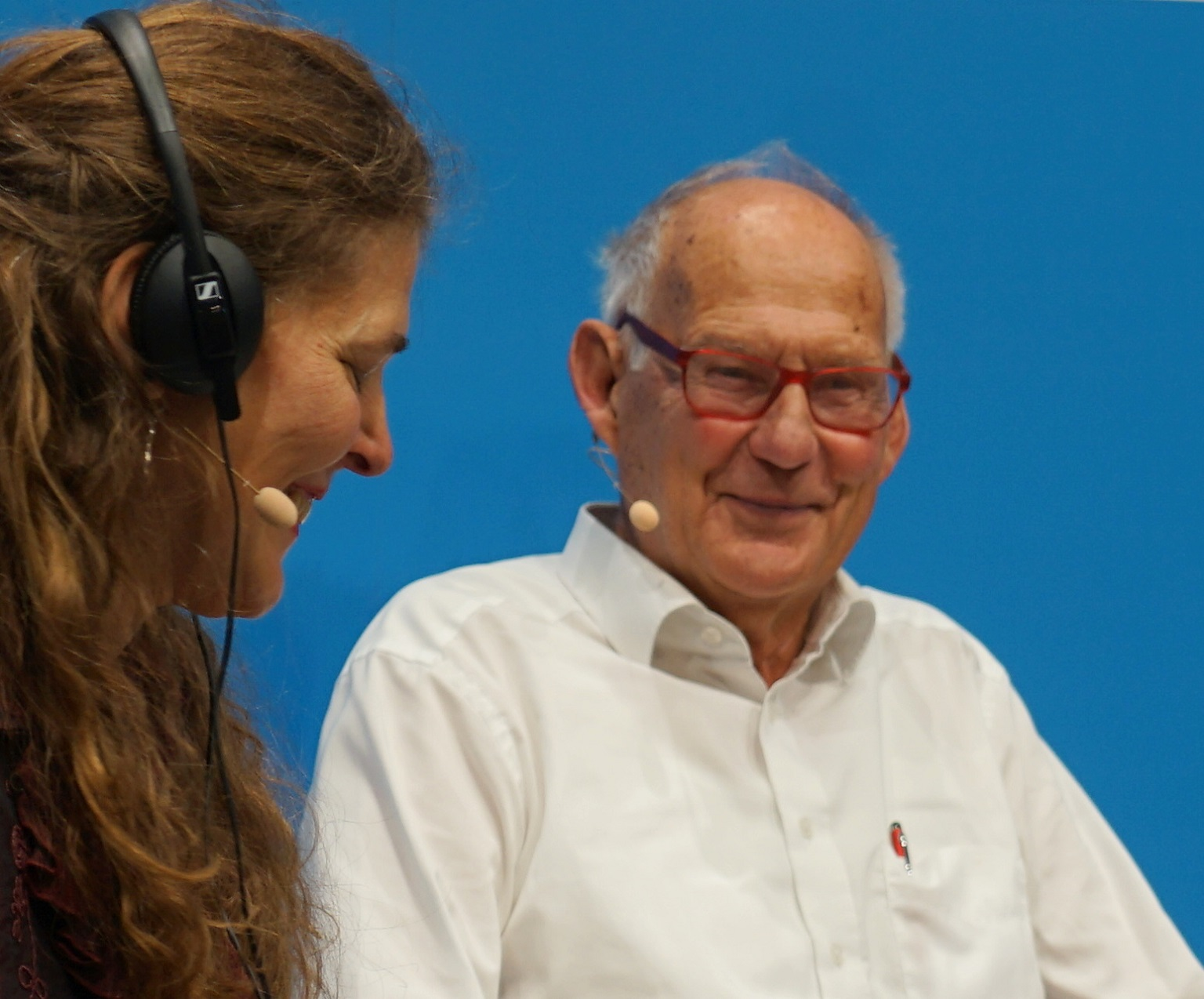
- Otfried Höffe in 2022
- Born: 12 September 1943 (age 82); Leobschütz, Upper Silesia Province, Prussia
- Occupations: Philosopher and professor

Otfried Höffe (born 12 September 1943 in Leobschütz, Upper Silesia Province, Prussia) is a German philosopher and professor.

== Academic career ==
From 1964 to 1970, Höffe studied philosophy, history, sociology and theology at the universities of Münster, Tübingen, Saarbrücken and Munich. His 1971 dissertation was on the practical philosophy of Aristotle. In 1970 and 1971, he was visiting scholar at Columbia University.

Höffe qualified as a professor in Munich in 1974 with a dissertation on Strategies of Humanity. On the ethics of public decision-making. In 1976, he got his first full professorship at the University of Duisburg. From 1978 until 1992, he was professor for social philosophy in Fribourg, Switzerland. Höffe also had a lectureship in social ethics at the ETH Zurich from 1986 to 1998. Since 1992, Höffe is a professor of philosophy at the University of Tübingen. In 2002, he also became constant guest professor for philosophy of law at the University of St. Gallen, Switzerland. His main and most famous books, including Kant's Cosmopolitan Theory of Law and Peace translated by Alexandra M. Newton, deal with ethics, philosophy of law and economics, and the philosophy of Immanuel Kant and Aristotle.

In April 2020, Höffe was appointed by Minister-President Armin Laschet of North Rhine-Westphalia to a 12-member expert group to advise on economic and social consequences of the COVID-19 pandemic in Germany.

== Personal life ==
Höffe resides in Tübingen.

== Bibliography ==
[none of the translations of his work into English are listed]

=== Books ===
- Praktische Philosophie, das Modell des Aristoteles. 3. Auflage. Akademie-Verlag, Berlin 2008, ISBN 978-3-05-004395-1.
- Den Staat braucht selbst ein Volk von Teufeln: philos. Versuche zur Rechts- u. Staatsethik. Reclam, Stuttgart 1988, ISBN 3-15-008507-1.
- Politische Gerechtigkeit: Grundlegung einer kritischen Philosophie von Recht und Staat. 4. Auflage. Suhrkamp, 2003, ISBN 3-518-28400-2.
- Kategorische Rechtsprinzipien: ein Kontrapunkt der Moderne. Suhrkamp, Frankfurt 1995, ISBN 3-518-28770-2.
- Moral als Preis der Moderne: ein Versuch über Wissenschaft, Technik und Umwelt. 4. Auflage. Suhrkamp, Frankfurt 2000, ISBN 3-518-28646-3.
- Vernunft und Recht: Bausteine zu einem interkulturellen Rechtsdiskurs. 2. Auflage. Suhrkamp, Frankfurt 1998, ISBN 3-518-28870-9.
- Gibt es ein interkulturelles Strafrecht?: ein philosophischer Versuch. Suhrkamp, Frankfurt 1999, ISBN 3-518-28996-9.
- Demokratie im Zeitalter der Globalisierung. C. H. Beck, München 2001, ISBN 3-406-47599-X.
- „Königliche Völker“: zu Kants kosmopolitischer Rechts- und Friedenstheorie. Suhrkamp, Frankfurt 2001, ISBN 3-518-29119-X.
- Medizin ohne Ethik? 2. Auflage. Suhrkamp, Frankfurt 2003, ISBN 3-518-12245-2.
- Gerechtigkeit. Eine philosophische Einführung. 4. durchgesehene Auflage. C. H. Beck, München 2010, ISBN 978-3-406-44768-6
- Kleine Geschichte der Philosophie. C. H. Beck, München 2001, 2. Auflage 2008, ISBN 978-3-406-57385-9. [Rezension: Ursula Pia Jauch in NZZ, 31. Januar 2002]
- Kants Kritik der reinen Vernunft. Die Grundlegung der modernen Philosophie. 2. Auflage. C. H. Beck, München 2003, ISBN 3-406-50919-3.
- Wirtschaftsbürger, Staatsbürger, Weltbürger. Politische Ethik im Zeitalter der Globalisierung. C. H. Beck, München 2004, ISBN 3-406-52208-4.
- Aristoteles. 4., überarbeitete Auflage. Beck’sche Reihe Denker, München 2014, ISBN 3-406-54125-9.
- Immanuel Kant. 7., überarbeitete Auflage. Beck’sche Reihe Denker, München 2007, ISBN 978-3-406-54762-1.
- Lebenskunst und Moral oder macht Tugend glücklich? C. H. Beck, München 2007, ISBN 978-3-406-55745-3.
- Ist die Demokratie zukunftsfähig? Über moderne Politik. C. H. Beck, München 2009, ISBN 978-3-406-58717-7.
- Thomas Hobbes. C. H. Beck Verlag, München 2010, ISBN 978-3-406-60021-0.
- Kants Kritik der praktischen Vernunft: Eine Philosophie der Freiheit. C. H. Beck, München 2012, ISBN 978-3-406-63934-0
- Ethik. Eine Einführung. C. H. Beck Verlag, München 2013, ISBN 978-3-406-64630-0.
- Die Macht der Moral im 21. Jahrhundert. C. H. Beck Verlag, München 2014, ISBN 978-3-406-66001-6.
- Kritik der Freiheit: Das Grundproblem der Moderne. C. H. Beck Verlag, München 2015, ISBN 978-3-406-67503-4.

=== Edited volumes ===
- Aristoteles-Lexikon. Kröner-Verlag, Stuttgart 2005, ISBN 3-520-45901-9
- Lexikon der Ethik. 7. Auflage. C. H. Beck, München 2008, ISBN 978-3-406-56810-7
- Einführung in die utilitaristische Ethik: klassische und zeitgenössische Texte. 4. Auflage. Francke (UTB), Tübingen 2008, ISBN 978-3-8252-1683-2
- Grundlegung zur Metaphysik der Sitten. Ein kooperativer Kommentar. 3. Auflage. Klostermann, Frankfurt 2000, ISBN 978-3-465-03057-7
- Immanuel Kant, Kritik der praktischen Vernunft (kooperativer Kommentar). Akademie Verlag, Berlin 2002, ISBN 3-05-003576-5
- Immanuel Kant, zum ewigen Frieden (kooperativer Kommentar). 2. Auflage. Akademie Verlag, Berlin 2004, ISBN 3-05-004084-X
- John Rawls, Eine Theorie der Gerechtigkeit (kooperativer Kommentar), Akademie Verlag, Berlin, 2. Aufl. 2006, ISBN 978-3-05-004267-1
- Aristoteles: Die Hauptwerke: Ein Lesebuch, Francke, Tübingen 2009, ISBN 978-3-7720-8314-3
- Immanuel Kant: Die Religion innerhalb der Grenzen der bloßen Vernunft (kooperativer Kommentar), Akademie Verlag, Berlin 2010, ISBN 978-3-05-004682-2
- Immanuel Kant: Schriften zur Geschichtsphilosophie (kooperativer Kommentar), Akademie Verlag, Berlin 2012, ISBN 978-3-05-004683-9

=== Essays ===
- Der wissenschaftliche Tierversuch: bioethische Überlegungen. In: Schweizerische Ärztezeitung. Band Nr. 63. 1982, S. 1001–1010.
- Subsidiarität als Gesellschafts- und Staatsprinzip. In: Swiss Political Science Review 3, 1997, doi:10.1002/j.1662-6370.1997.tb00222.x (PDF; 195 kB).
- Der Kampf der Kulturen kann ausfallen. Die moderne Zivilisation ist multireligiös verträglich und enthält eine große allgemeinmenschliche Kraft. In: Frankfurter Allgemeine Sonntagszeitung. 14. Oktober 2001.
- Gerechtigkeit als Tausch. Zur Begründung von Recht und Staat. (PDF; 92 kB) Festvortrag zur Eröffnung der Rechtswissenschaftlichen Fakultät der Universität Luzern, 22. Oktober 2001.
- Daten- und Persönlichkeitsschutz im Zeitalter der Globalisierung. (PDF; 68 kB) Freundesgabe Büllesbach 2002.
- Wie aber trägst du’s? Was das Kopftuch symbolisieren kann. In: FAZ, 29. März 2004.
- Soziale Gerechtigkeit. Über die Bedingungen realer Freiheit. In: NZZ, 4. Juni 2005.
- Liberale Demokratie, Kulturen und Religionen. (PDF; 172 kB) Vortrag 13.–14. Juni 2005.
- Ungleichheit – Ungerechtigkeit. (PDF; 2,97 MB) Aus Politik und Zeitgeschichte, 37/2005, mit Aufsätzen von Otfried Höffe, Paul Nolte, Rainer Forst.
- Vom Nutzen des Nutzlosen. Zur Bedeutung der Philosophie im Zeitalter der Ökonomisierung. In: Deutsche Zeitschrift für Philosophie. 53 (2005), H. 5, S. 667–678.
- Europa ist nicht mit der Europäischen Union identisch. In: NZZ, 23. Januar 2006.
- Maximal oder optimal. Zur Ethik der Hochleistungsmedizin. (PDF; 42 kB) Vortrag am 10. Mai 2006.
- Buch und Autor: rechtsphilosophische und rechtspolitische Überlegungen. (PDF; 28 kB) Vortrag zum 60-jährigen Jubiläum des Akademie-Verlags am 11. Oktober 2006.
- Das übertreibende Denken. Hannah Arendts Hauptwerk: eine kritische Würdigung. In: Die Welt, 14. Oktober 2006.
- Kant ist kein Frankfurter. In: Die Zeit, Nr. 45/2007.
- Keine Einbahnstraße. In: Die Welt. 10. November 2007.
- Hin zum Weltbürgerrecht. In: Die Welt, 5. April 2008.
- Macht Tugend glücklich? Über Lebenskunst und Moral. (PDF; 130 kB) e-Journal Philosophie der Psychologie.
- Früher war alles besser. In: Die Welt, 13. September 2008.
- Zur Theorie der Kommunikation: Wahrheit und Gerechtigkeit durch Konsens finden? (PDF; 446 kB) Rede vor der Novartisstiftung am 5. Dezember 2008.
- Verdienen die Manager, was sie verdienen? Ein philosophischer Blick auf Spitzenlöhne. In: NZZ, 22. April 2009.
- Helfen zum Tod, Hilfe im Sterben. In: FAZ, 5. Juni 2010, S. 8.
- Souverän ist, wer über Verstand verfügt, FAZ 10. August 2012
- Demokratie von unten: Europa als Bürgerrepublik – Statt der Utopie Vereinigter Staaten von Europa ist lediglich eine Vision vertretbar, die auf Subsidiarität setzt und Europa über die Unionsgrenzen hinaus anerkennt. Gastkommentar, NZZ 4. September 2017
