= Joachim Gnilka =

German Roman Catholic theologian and New Testament scholar

Joachim Gnilka (8 December 1928 in Leobschütz/Silesia – 15 January 2018 in Munich) was a German Roman Catholic theologian, New Testament scholar, exegete, and professor.

== Biography ==
Gnilka studied Catholic theology, Christian philosophy, and Oriental languages in Eichstätt, Würzburg, and Rome from 1947 to 1953. From 1953 to 1956 he served as chaplain in Würzburg. In 1955, Gnilka earned a Doctorate of Theology (Th.D.). In 1959, he earned a habilitation, and from 1959 to 1962 was Privatdozent (associate professor, senior lecturer) at the University of Würzburg. From 1962 to 1975, he was professor of New Testament at the University of Münster. From 1975 to 1997, he was professor at LMU Munich. From 1973 to 1988, Gnilka was a member of the Pontifical Biblical Commission, and from 1986 to 1997 a member of the International Theological Commission.

His commentary on the Gospel of Matthew, Das Mattheusevangelium, was extensively quoted by Pope Benedict XVI in his 2007 book Jesus of Nazareth: From the Baptism in the Jordan to the Transfiguration.

== Bibliography ==
- Gnilka, Joachim (1971). Epistle to the Philippians. Sheed & W. ISBN 978-0-7220-0417-3.
- —— (1982). Der Brief an Philemon. Herders theologischer Kommentar zum Neuen Testament. Vol. 10/4. Freiburg/B: Herder.
- —— (1986). Das Mattheusevangelium. Freiburg: Herder.
- —— (1994). Jesus of Nazareth. Message and History. Grand Rapids, MI: Baker Book House. ISBN 978-0-8010-4637-7.
- —— (1990). Der Brief an die Epheser. Herders theologischer Kommentar zum Neuen Testament. Vol. 10/2. Freiburg/B: Herder. ISBN 3-451-16275-X.
- —— (1991). Der Brief an die Kolosser. Herders theologischer Kommentar zum Neuen Testament. Vol. 10/1. Freiburg/B: Herder.
- —— (1997). Paulus von Tarsus. Apostel und Zeuge. Freiburg/B: Herder. ISBN 3-451-26377-7.
- —— (1999). Die frühen Christen. Ursprünge und Anfang der Kirche. Freiburg/B: Herder. ISBN 3-451-27094-3.
- —— (1999). Theologie des Neuen Testaments. Freiburg/B: Herder. ISBN 3-451-26093-X.
- —— (2002). Petrus und Rom. Das Petrusbild in den ersten zwei Jahrhunderten. Freiburg/B: Herder.
- —— (2004). Johannesevangelium. Wurzburg: Echter-Verlag. ISBN 3-429-00841-7.
- —— (2004). Wie das Christentum entstand. Freiburg/B: Herder. ISBN 3-451-28307-7. (3 Bde.)
- —— (2007). Die Nazarener und der Koran. Eine Spurensuche. Freiburg/B: Herder. ISBN 978-3-451-29668-0.
- —— (2010). Bibel und Koran: Was sie verbindet, was sie trennt. Verlag Herder. ISBN 978-3-451-06218-6.

== Sources ==
- Joachim Gnilka on the Homepage of Westfälischen Wilhelms-University Münster
- Joachim Gnilka on the Homepage of Ludwig-Maximilians-Universität München
