= Henryk IX =

Henryk IX may refer to

- Henry IX of Lubin (1369 – 1419/1420)
- Henry IX the Older (ca. 1389 – 1467)
