= Bernard of Niemodlin =

Polish duke and nobleman

Bernard
- Duke of Strzelce, Niemodlin, Opole
- Coat-of-arms of Upper Silesia (Opole, Strzelce, Niemodlin, etc)
- Born: 1374/78
- Died: 2/4 April 1455
- Noble family: Silesian Piasts of Opole
- Father: Bolko III of Strzelce
- Mother: Anna (of Oświęcim?)

Bernard of Niemodlin (Polish: Bernard niemodliński; b. 1374/78 – d. 2/4 April 1455), was a Duke of Strzelce and Niemodlin during 1382–1400 (with his brothers as co-rulers), Duke of Opole during 1396–1400 (with his brother as co-ruler), from 1400 until 1450 sole ruler over Strzelce and Niemodlin, from 1401 ruler over Olesno and Lubliniec, from 1420 ruler over Prudnik and in 1424 ruler over Głogówek, during 1434–1450 ruler over Kluczbork and Byczyna and from 1450 ruler over only Olesno.

He was the fourth and youngest son of Duke Bolko III of Strzelce by his wife Anna, probably daughter of Duke Jan I of Oświęcim.

== Life ==
At the time of his father's death in 1382 Bernard was a minor and was placed under the care of his uncle Władysław Opolczyk and his older brothers Jan Kropidło and Bolko IV. The first appearance of Bernard in the political affairs took place on 6 August 1396, when he was present in the peace talks between the Polish King Władysław II Jagiełło and the Dukes of Opole; in this meeting, was arranged the betrothal of Bernard with Hedwig (died 23 Oct 1424), daughter of Spytko II z Melsztyna, Voivode of Kraków. This engagement was the guarantee that the young Dukes of Opole don't follow the steps of his uncle Władysław Opolczyk against the Kingdom of Poland. As additional security, the districts of Olesno and Lubliniec were promised to the Dukes of Opole as fiefs; but, in absence of male heirs, they reverted to Spytka II's daughters as a dowry.

In 1400 was made the formal division of the Duchy of Opole. Bernard obtained Strzelce and Niemodlin as sole ruler. One year later, in 1401, took place his marriage with Hedwig z Melsztyna and received the formal possession of Olesno and Lubliniec. In 1402 Bernard was recognized as a President of the Silesian states.

In the first years of his rule of Bernard tried to lead a policy of close cooperation with Poland and in 1414 he even participated at the King's side in the war against the Teutonic Order. However, this changed in 1417, when the Dukes of Opole had to face the pretensions of Dukes Jan I and Henry IX of Żagań, who claimed rights from their mother Katharina of Opole, daughter of Władysław Opolczyk. The dispute was to be settled on the Prague court, where, for unknown reasons, on 2 July 1417 Bolko IV and Bernard received an adverse ruling and were obliged to give all the inheritance of Władysław Opolczyk to the Dukes of Żagań. The formal approval of this decision by King Wenceslaus IV of Bohemia was fixed at the beginning of next year (1418), but at the end wasn't performed, and only the death of the King one year later applazed indefinitely the matter. In any event, during the next years and until the ruling was cancelled by the Emperor Sigismund on 16 September 1435, Bernard and Bolko IV have to work closely with the House of Luxembourg in order to gain the Imperial favor.

In 1417 Bernard was a judge in a dispute between the children of Spytko II z Melsztyna about the inheritance of one of his daughters, wife of the eldest son of Duke Janusz I of Warsaw. After the death of Euphemia of Masovia, widow of Władysław Opolczyk by 1424, Bernard and his brother Bolko IV inherited her dower lands, Głogówek, which at the end of that year was given to Bolko IV's son, Bolko V the Hussite.

Together with his older brother Bolko IV, Bernard took part in the Congress of Bratislava in 1423. After Bolko III's sons assumed the government over Opole, was promised to them the possession over Sieradz and part of Greater Poland, but the disputes between the Emperor Sigismund and the King Władysław II Jagiełło leave this agreement only in paper.

However, Bernard maintain his fidelity to the House of Luxembourg. In 1424 the Duke of Niemodlin took part in the coronation of Sophia of Halshany as Queen of Poland and spent some time in Kraków.

In the 1420s Silesia was shaken by the conflicts with the Hussites. In order to stop the inminet advance of the Hussite troops, Bernard and other Silesian rulers made a defensive agreement with Sigismund Korybut (nephew of King Władysław II Jagiełło) in Strzelin on 14 February 1427; however, this treaty never was effective because soon after Sigismund was imprisoned, so in 1428 Bernard and his brother Bolko IV made the peace with the Hussites, but this doesn't provide a complete security to their domains. In 1434 Bernard using the confusion reigning in Silesia and purchased with to the Dukes of Brzeg the towns of Kluczbork and Byczyna.

In order to stop the continues conflicts between Silesia and Lesser Poland in 1434 was performed a Congress of Polish and Silesian rulers in Będzin, were assisted, among others, Bernard and the Bishop of Kraków, Zbigniew Oleśnicki where they made the commitment to joint forces to resolve the problem (at the end, the agreement never took place, and the fights continued until 1460 at the latest, with a particular increase during the 1440s).

In 1438 the election of Casimir Jagiełło as King of Bohemia forced Bernard to paid homage to him, but after the coronation of his competitor Albert of Habsburg on 3 December 1438 obliged to the Duke of Niemodlin to make another homage in the Congress of Wrocław, this time to the Austrian ruler.

In 1443 Bernard, together with his nephew Bolko V, challenged the legality of the purchase of the Duchy of Siewierz by the Bishop Zbigniew Oleśnicki. This led to a new war, who lasted with interruptions until 1452, which resulted in significant destruction on the Silesian-Lesser Poland frontiers (as during 1446–1448 Bernard managed to take control over Będzin).

Without male heirs—from his marriage with Hedwig z Melsztyna he only had two daughters, Anna and Hedwig, whose nothing more is known except their names—in 1450 Bernard decided to give his Duchies of Niemodlina and Strzelce to his oldest nephew Bolko V in return for the payment of his debts and moved to the small Olesno. At the same time, Bernard gave up his rights over the Duchy of Opole to his other nephew, Nicholas I.

Bernard died between 2 and 4 April 1455, giving the rest of his domains to Bolko V. It is not known where he was buried.

Bernard of Niemodlin House of Piast Born: between 1374 and 1378 Died: between 2 and 4 April 1455
Regnal titles
Preceded by Bolko III	Duke of Strzelce with Bolko IV (until 1400) and Henry II (until 1394); 1382–1450	Succeeded by Bolko V the Hussite
Preceded by Henry	Duke of Niemodlin with Bolko IV (until 1400) and Henry II (until 1394); 1382–1450	Succeeded by Bolko V the Hussite
Preceded by Władysław Opolczyk	Duke of Opole with Bolko IV; 1396–1400	Succeeded by Bolko IV
