= Wenceslaus III =

Wenceslaus III may refer to:

- Wenceslaus III of Oława (1400–23), Duke of Oława (1419/20–23)
- Wenceslaus III, Duke of Rybnik (c. 1442 – 1479)
- Wenceslaus III Adam, Duke of Cieszyn (1524–1579), Duke of Cieszyn (1528–79)
- Wenceslaus III of Bohemia (1289–1306), King of Hungary (1301–05), King of Bohemia and of Poland (1305–06)
