= Louis of Opole =

Louis
- Duke of Opole, Brzeg, Strzelce, Niemodlin
- Coat-of-arms of Upper Silesia (Opole, Strzelce, etc)
- Born: 1450
- Died: before 4 September 1476 (aged 25–26)
- Noble family: Silesian Piasts of Strzelce
- Father: Nicholas I of Opole
- Mother: Agnes of Brzeg

Louis of Opole (Polish: Ludwik opolski; 1450 – before 4 September 1476), was a Duke of Opole-Brzeg-Strzelce-Niemodlin during 1466–1476 (as co-ruler of his father) and briefly in 1476 (with his brothers as co-rulers).

He was the eldest son of Duke Nicholas I of Opole by his wife Agnes, daughter of Duke Louis II of Brzeg. He was named after his maternal grandfather.

== Life ==
In 1466 Louis was named co-ruler of the Duchy of Opole by his father. One year later (in 1467), he took part in the Congress of Wrocław, where it was decided to declare the war to the king of Bohemia, George of Poděbrady, and Casimir Jagiełło was invited to take the Bohemian throne.

Louis died between 23 May and 4 September 1476. If he lived after 3 July 1476, he could have ruled the Duchy of Opole for a few months after the death of his father. It is unknown where he was buried, although it is assumed with a high degree of probability that it could have happened in the Franciscan church in Opole.

After he died unmarried and childless, his younger brothers Jan II the Good and Nicholas II assumed the government over Opole as co-rulers, but later in that year they decided to make the division of their domains.

Regnal titles
Preceded by Nicholas I	Duke of Opole with Jan II and Nicholas II; 1476	Succeeded by Jan II the Good and Nicholas II
Preceded by Nicholas I	Duke of Brzeg with Jan II and Nicholas II; 1476	Succeeded by Jan II the Good and Nicholas II
Preceded by Nicholas I	Duke of Strzelce with Jan II and Nicholas II; 1476	Succeeded by Jan II the Good and Nicholas II
Preceded by Nicholas I	Duke of Niemodlin with Jan II and Nicholas II; 1476	Succeeded by Jan II the Good and Nicholas II
