= Jan II the Good =

- Duke of Opole, Głogówek, Racibórz, Niemodlin, Strzelce, Prudnik, Biała, Krapkowice, Olesno, Lubliniec, Gliwice, Toszek, Bytom, Koźle, Rybnik, Żory
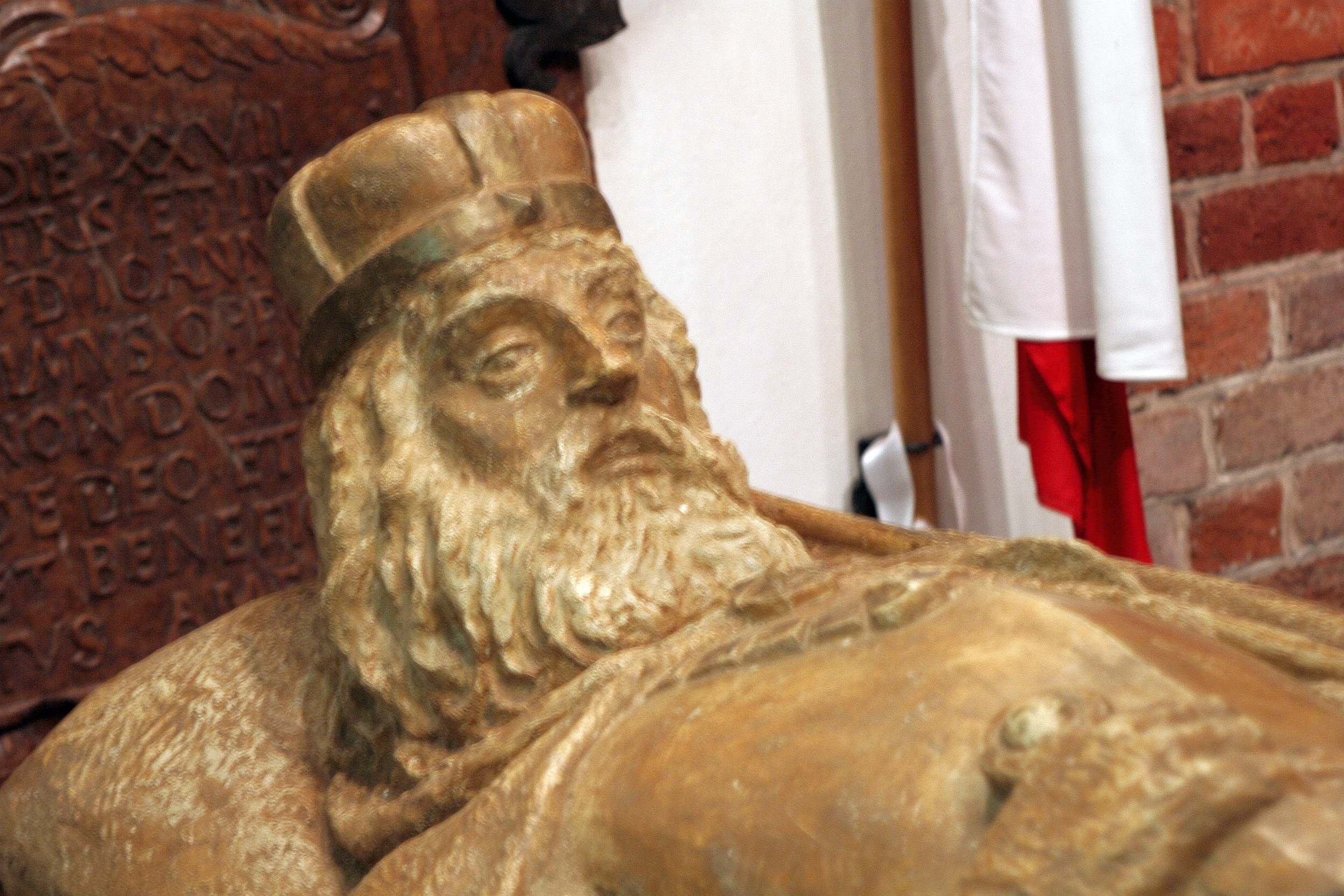
- Jan II of Opole's sarcophagus
- Born: c. 1460
- Died: 27 March 1532
- Noble family: Silesian Piasts of Strzelce
- Father: Nicholas I of Opole
- Mother: Agnes of Brzeg

Jan II the Good (Polish: Jan II Dobry; c. 1460 – 27 March 1532) was Duke of Opole-Brzeg (until 1481)-Strzelce-Niemodlin in 1476 (with his brothers as co-rulers during 1476), ruler over Gliwice (in 1494), Toszek (in 1495), Niemodlin (again, in 1497), Bytom (in 1498), Koźle (in 1509), and Racibórz (in 1521). He belonged to the Silesian branch of the Polish Piast dynasty which was the oldest branch of the first Polish royal dynasty.

He was born as the second son of Duke Nicholas I of Opole by his wife Agnes, daughter of Duke Louis II of Brzeg.

== Life ==
=== Early political activities ===
After the death of his father and eldest brother Louis in 1476, Jan II initially shared the government over the Duchy with his younger brother Nicholas II. Soon, however, probably still in 1476, the brothers decided to make the division of their domains: Jan II took over the governments over Opole, Strzelce and Brzeg, while Nicholas II received Niemodlin. However, this division was only a formality as the two brothers continue to co-rule their whole inheritance.

During his long life Jan II led the already small Duchy of Opole to a significant economic development. Not without significance was also his constant acquisition of lands in Upper Silesia, who became him one of the most powerful Silesian rulers.

However, the first years of the rule of Jan II weren't successfully. Actually, in 1477 together with Nicholas II, the Duke bought Prudnik from Duke Konrad X of Oleśnica, but four years later (in 1481), under the pressures of Duke Frederick I of Legnica the brothers must agree to redeem the pledge over Brzeg since 1450.

On 27 June 1497 Nicholas II was beheaded in the Nysa market at the behest of Casimir II, Duke of Cieszyn, Duke Henry I of Ziębice and the Bishop of Wrocław, Jan IV Roth. After hearing the news about this events in Nysa, Jan II decided to avenge his brother's death and began to gather troops in order to make a brutally retaliatory expedition against Cieszyn. Only through the diplomatic moves of King Władysław II Jagiellon and the absence of support for the war between his neighbors, prevented the civil war in Silesia.

=== Expansion of the Duchy ===
Since the 1490s Jan II began a considerable development of his domains. Thanks to the increased debts of several Silesian rulers, within only a few years the Duke of Opole became in the owner of almost the majority of Upper Silesia. Only Cieszyn maintain his independence, while Oświęcim was annexed by Poland. The growth of the Duchy of Opole was slowly but continuously: in 1494 was bought Gliwice and one year later (in 1495) Toszek was also bought. In 1497, after the death of Nicholas II, Niemodlin was inherited by Jan II, in 1498 was bought Bytom, and the Świerklaniec castle with his privileges, and finally in 1509 was annexed Koźle.

=== The inheritance of Racibórz ===
After all the territorial acquisitions, only the entire southern of the Silesian border was governed by the Przemyslid Dukes of Racibórz. The first contract of mutual inheritance with the then reign Duke Jan V was made around 1478, probably on occasion of the marriage between Jan V and Magdalena of Opole, Jan II's sister. However, was only after the unexpected deaths of Jan V's older sons (and Jan II's nephews) Nicholas VI and Jan VI in 1506 and the taking of the youngest and only surviving brother, Valentin, of the full government over Racibórz, when was revived the old treaty with the Duke of Opole.

The formal contract of mutual inheritance was performed in 1511 between the childless Duke Valentin and Jan II. The contract, who counted with the approval of King Władysław II Jagiellon, came into force after the death of Valentin in 1521: Jan II inherited the Duchy of Racibórz, who was combined with the Duchy of Opole. The newly Duchy of Opole-Racibórz covered an area from the Ścinawa and Nysa Kłodzka Rivers in the West, the Sudetes and the Vistula River in the south, and the borders with Poland in the east and north. This represented a territory the size of 12,000 kilometers.

Since the beginning of his reign, Jan II was in favor of the Polish culture, maintain regular contacts with Kings John I Albert, Alexander and Sigismund I the Old. There are even some suggestions that the Jan II knew only the Polish and Czech languages (the Czech was the official language in Silesia).

Jan II probably preferred to stay in his domains and rarely leave Opole. There is only one known case when the Duke of Opole departed from his Duchy, in 1476, when Jan II went to Apulia as an envoy of King Matthias Corvinus of Hungary, in order to escort his bride Beatrice, daughter of King Ferdinand I of Naples.

Jan II had a passion for hunting in the Upper Silesian forests. For this purpose, moreover, he used huge sums of money.

=== Privileges ===
Jan II, with due regard to the economic development of his domains seemed to granted many privileges, gained fame with the largest 72 articles of the called Ordunek Górny on 16 November 1528 issued in Opole, which was a privilege to develop the mining in the Duchy, which a considerably diminution of the Duke's treasure. In return for the privileges given to the cities, Jan II has received a part of the profits from the mines. Among the beneficiaries of the privileges was Tarnowskie Góry, who became in one of the largest and prospers cities of Upper Silesia. Soon before his death in 1531, Jan II also gave privileges to the Opole and Racibórz townspeople against the increased oppressions of the nobility (the so-called Hanuszowy Privilege).

=== Death and succession ===
Jan II never married or had children. The reason, according to reliable sources, was he was impotent. Consequently, many years before his death, Jan II saw the competition between various rulers for his inheritance. Candidates for the domains of the childless were, among others, the King of Bohemia (firstly Louis II Jagiellon and since 1526 Ferdinand I of Habsburg), Zdenko Lew, Burgrave of Prague, and Dukes Casimir II of Cieszyn and Frederick II of Legnica. Initially, the slightest chance of be declared heir of Jan II was to George, Margrave of Brandenburg-Ansbach. However, the Margrave gained the support of King Louis II and particularly the favor of the old Duke of Opole. The death of Louis II and the succession of Ferdinand I of Habsburg in the Bohemian-Hungarian Kingdom put in jeopardy the chances of George of Brandenburg. Only after the sign of a treaty in Prague on 17 June 1531 and the payment of 183,333 guilders to King Ferdinand I persuaded him to accept the candidacy of the Margrave of Ansbach.

Jan II, the last male member of the Opole branch, died in Racibórz on 27 March 1532 and was buried in the church of Holy Cross in Opole.

After the death, the Duchy of Opole-Racibórz was inherited by George of Brandenburg-Ansbach. In accordance with previous agreements, the movable property was exported to Vienna.

Jan II the Good House of Piast Born: c. 1460 Died: 27 March 1532
Regnal titles
Preceded by Nicholas I	Duke of Opole with Louis (until 1476) and Nicholas II (until 1497); 1476–1521	Unification with the Duchy of Racibórz
Preceded by Nicholas I	Duke of Brzeg with Louis and Nicholas II (until 1476); 1476–1481	Succeeded by Frederick I
Preceded by Nicholas I	Duke of Strzelce with Louis and Nicholas II (until 1476); 1476–1521	Incorporated to the Duchy of Opole-Racibórz
Preceded by Nicholas I	Duke of Niemodlin with Louis and Nicholas II; 1476	Succeeded by Nicholas II
Preceded by Nicholas II	Duke of Niemodlin; 1497–1521	Incorporated to the Duchy of Opole-Racibórz
Preceded by Direct sovereignty of the Kingdom of Bohemia last holder Konrad X the White	Duke of Bytom; 1498–1521	Incorporated to the Duchy of Opole-Racibórz
Preceded by Direct sovereignty of the Kingdom of Bohemia last holder Konrad X the White	Duke of Koźle; 1509–1521	Incorporated to the Duchy of Opole-Racibórz
Preceded by Valentin	Duke of Racibórz; 1521	Unification with the Duchy of Opole
Preceded by —	Duke of Opole-Racibórz; 1521–1532	Extinct
