= Henry X of Haynau =

Henry X
- Duke of Lubin, Chojnów, Brzeg, Złotoryja
- Coat-of-arms of Silesian Piasts
- Born: 1426
- Died: before 28 May 1452
- Noble family: Silesian Piasts
- Father: Louis III of Oława
- Mother: Margareta of Opole

Henry X, Duke of Haynau (1426 – before 28 May 1452) was Duke of Lüben (Lubin), during 1441–1446 with his brother as co-ruler, Haynau (Chojnów, since 1452), Brieg (Brzeg) and Goldberg (Złotoryja, during 1449–1450 with his brother, as co-rulers.

He was the second son of Louis III, Duke of Ohlau-Lüben-Goldberg, by his wife Margareta, daughter of Duke Bolko IV of Opole.

== Life ==
In 1441, after the death of his father, Henry X and his older brother John I inherited the Duchies of Lüben and Haynau together as co-rulers. Their mother, Duchess Margareta, received Ohlau as a widow's land.

In 1443 both received Brieg from Elisabeth of Brandenburg, Duchess of Legnica-Brieg. The hard financial situation forced Henry X and John I to pledge their Duchy of Lüben to Duke Henry IX of Glogau in 1446. In 1450 they pledged Brieg, this time to their maternal uncle, Duke Nicholas I of Opole. At the end, the brothers only retain Haynau and Strehlen (Strzelin), who ruled together until Henry X's death without issue, leaving John I as a sole Duke.

Preceded by Louis III	Duke of Lubin with John I 1441–1446	Succeeded by Henry IX
Preceded by Louis III	Duke of Chojnów with John I 1441–1452	Succeeded by Jan I
Preceded by Elisabeth of Brandenburg	Duke of Brzeg with John I 1443–1450	Succeeded by Nicholas I
