= Nicholas II of Niemodlin =

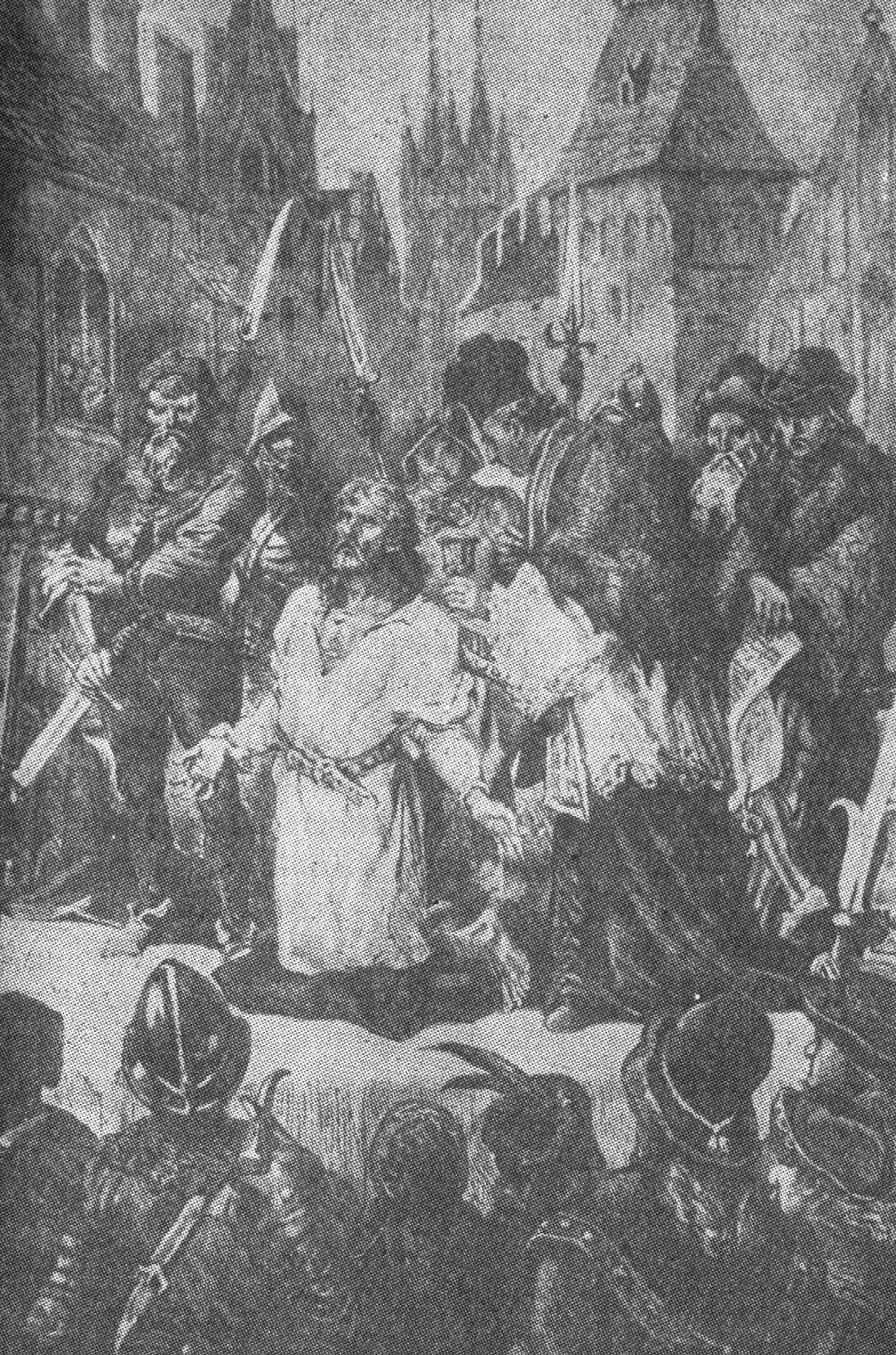
The behading of Nicholas II of Niemodlin on June 27, 1497

Nicholas II of Niemodlin (Polish: Mikołaj II Niemodliński; c. 1462 – 27 June 1497), was a Duke of Opole-Brzeg-Strzelce-Niemodlin in 1476 (as co-ruler of his father) and sole Duke of Niemodlin from 1476 until his death.

He was the third son of Duke Nicholas I of Opole by his wife Agnes, daughter of Duke Louis II of Brzeg.

== Life ==
After his father's death in 1476, Nicholas II inherited Opole, Brzeg, Strzelce and Niemodlin together with his older brothers Louis and Jan II the Good as co-rulers. However, soon Louis died and Nicholas II maintained the co-government with Jan II. It is unknown the exact date of the division of the duchy between the surviving brothers, and even if this division really existed; however indirect sources inferred that Nicholas II became in the independent ruler of Niemodlin shortly after Louis's death, maybe only as a formal rule. In any case, most of the inheritance (included Opole) was retained by Jan II. The now Duke of Niemodlin supported his brother in his politics: in 1477 the brothers bought Prudnik to Duke Konrad X of Oleśnica, in 1494 they acquired Gliwice and in 1495 Toszek. The only territorial loss was in 1481, when Duke Frederick I of Legnica purchased Brzeg (pledged by his father in 1450) by the amounts of 8,500 fines and 1,500 ducats.

In foreign politics, Nicholas II sought to strike a balance between the powerful King of Hungary Matthias Corvinus and competitor and eventual co-ruler in the Bohemian Kingdom, Władysław II Jagiellon. Ultimately, however, aggressive politics towards the Hungarian ruler in favor of the Polish candidate resulted in his imprisonment in 1487 in Koźle. Nicholas II regained his freedom only after the payment of 15,000 Hungarian złoty as a ransom. Despite the participation of the Dukes of Opole in the Sejm reunited in Nuremberg later in that year, the relations with the Hungarian Kingdom remained tense until the death of Matthias Corvinus in 1490.

== Death ==
In June 1497, in order to end the disputes between the Duchies of Opole and Cieszyn, a meeting was arranged in Nysa. The issue of the Turkish threat to Hungary was also to be discussed. The gathering was attended by Nicholas II, Duke Casimir II of Cieszyn, Victor, Duke of Münsterberg and his brother Henry the Elder of Münsterberg and the Bishop of Wrocław, Jan IV Roth, among others.

On 26 June, Nicholas II tried to stab both Duke Casimir II and Bishop Jan IV Roth. The reason for his act is unknown, although some sources believed that Nicholas feared of the growing importance of Duke Casimir II. With the help of servants and nobles, the attack was defeated. Nicholas II tried to avoid the responsibility of the Town Hall and found refuge in the nearby church of St. Jakob, where he asked for sanctuary. He was nevertheless taken by force from the altar and put in a dungeon.

The nobles reunited (who included the victims of the Duke of Niemodlin) and long wondered what to do with the prisoner. Eventually, they decided to apply the common law of Nysa, although the Duke of Niemodlin was a royal prince. His attempts to obtain his freedom (which included an offer to pay the huge sum of 100,000 Hungarian złoty) produced no results, thanks to the clear opposition of the Duke of Cieszyn (at that time also Starost General of Silesia). Rather, the Duke successfully sought a death sentence for Nicholas. The trial was performed entirely in the German language, which Nicholas II apparently did not understand (there is some evidence that he and his brother Jan II only knew the Polish and Czech languages).

The Duke of Niemodlin was only allowed to write a letter to his brother, in which he left him all his domains. The court ruled that the sentence would take place almost immediately, in order to avoid a negative reaction from the Opole citizens and the Duke's brother. Nicholas II was beheaded by sword in the Nysa market on 27 June 1497. According to the tradition, his last words were: "Nysa! Nysa! You punish me because my ancestors had given you to the Church, and now you force me to pay the price?".

== Legacy ==
Nicholas II never married nor did he have children. According to his last wish, he was buried in the Franciscan church in Opole. On his tombstone was written the epitaph, "Here lies who fell for his true principles and give courageously his neck under the sword".

At the news of the execution of his brother, Jan II started to gather an army and prepared for a brutal retaliatory expedition against the Duchy of Cieszyn; however, the war ultimately did not occur as a result of the diplomatic moves of King Władysław II Jagiellon, saving Silesia from the civil war.

Nicholas II of Niemodlin House of Piast Born: c. 1462 Died: 27 June 1497
Regnal titles
Preceded by Nicholas I	Duke of Niemodlin; 1476–1497; With: Louis and Jan II (until 1476)	Succeeded by Jan II the Good
Preceded by Nicholas I	Duke of Opole; 1476; With: Louis and Jan II	Succeeded by Jan II the Good
Preceded by Nicholas I	Duke of Brzeg; 1476; With: Louis and Jan II	Succeeded by Jan II the Good
Preceded by Nicholas I	Duke of Strzelce; 1476; With: Louis and Jan II	Succeeded by Jan II the Good
