= Elisabeth of Brandenburg, Duchess of Brzeg-Legnica and Cieszyn =

German princess and duchess (1403-1449)

Elisabeth of Hohenzollern (Polish: Elżbieta; 1 May/29 September 1403 – 31 October 1449), was a German princess member of the House of Hohenzollern and by her two marriages Duchess of Brzeg-Legnica and Cieszyn.

She was the eldest daughter of Frederick I, Elector of Brandenburg by his wife Elisabeth, daughter of Frederick, Duke of Bavaria-Landshut.

== Life ==
Elisabeth married Duke Louis II of Brzeg-Legnica on 9 April 1418 in the city of Konstanz, during the Council where her father, then only Burgrave of Nürnberg, was elevated to the Electoral title from his Margraviate of Brandenburg. The union (who according to contemporary sources was very friendly) produced four children; from all, the eldest, Louis, was the only son and heir of his father. Prince Louis's early death in 1435 changed the political situation of Brzeg-Legnica: the heir apparent was Duke Louis II's only surviving nephew, Louis III of Oława, and apparently the Duke of Brzeg-Legnica didn't want to leave all his domains to him. Because of this, he arranged in his will that Elisabeth succeeded him in all his lands as her dower. As one of the wealthiest princes of his time, Duke Louis II also left to his wife and daughters 30,000 Rhenish guilders and 10,000 Bohemian groschen. Duke Louis II died on 30 May 1436 and Elisabeth assumed the full sovereignty over Brzeg, Legnica and Złotoryja.

On 17 February 1439 Elisabeth married again the several years younger Wenceslaus I, Duke of Cieszyn. According to the terms of the dower, after her remarriage she had lost all his rights over Brzeg-Legnica; however, Elisabeth managed to continue with her rule. She is mentioned as Duchess of Cieszyn for the first time on 5 March.

In 1443, Elisabeth was forced to give Brzeg to Dukes John I of Lüben and Henry X of Chojnów, sons of Louis III of Oława, who had died in 1441. Both brothers claimed the inheritance of Duke Louis II as his lawful male heirs and because Elisabeth retained both Duchies illegally. In order to make a bond with him, the Duchess gave her youngest daughter Hedwig in marriage to John I. The wedding took place in February 1445.

By the time of her daughter's marriage, Elisabeth and Duke Wenceslaus I became officially separated after six years of unhappy and childless union. Elisabeth settled in Legnica, where she died four years later. Wenceslaus I survived her by twenty-five years; he never remarried.

Shortly after Elisabeth's death, the local nobility rebelled against the Piast government and sought the help of Emperor Sigismund, who placed Legnica under the direct sovereignty of the Kingdom of Bohemia. Only in 1454 could Elisabeth's grandson, Duke Frederick I of Legnica (only child of John I and Hedwig), recover Legnica from Bohemia.

Elisabeth of Brandenburg, Duchess of Brzeg-Legnica and Cieszyn House of Hohenzollern Born: 20 September 1403 Died: 31 October 1449
| Preceded by Louis II | Duchess of Brzeg; 1436–1443 | Succeeded by John I and Henry X |
| Preceded by Louis II | Duchess of Legnica; 1436–1449 | Vacant Nobility revolt; state annexed by the Kingdom of Bohemia Title next held by Frederick I |
