= John I of Lüben =

- Duke of Lubin, Chojnów, Brzeg, Złotoryja
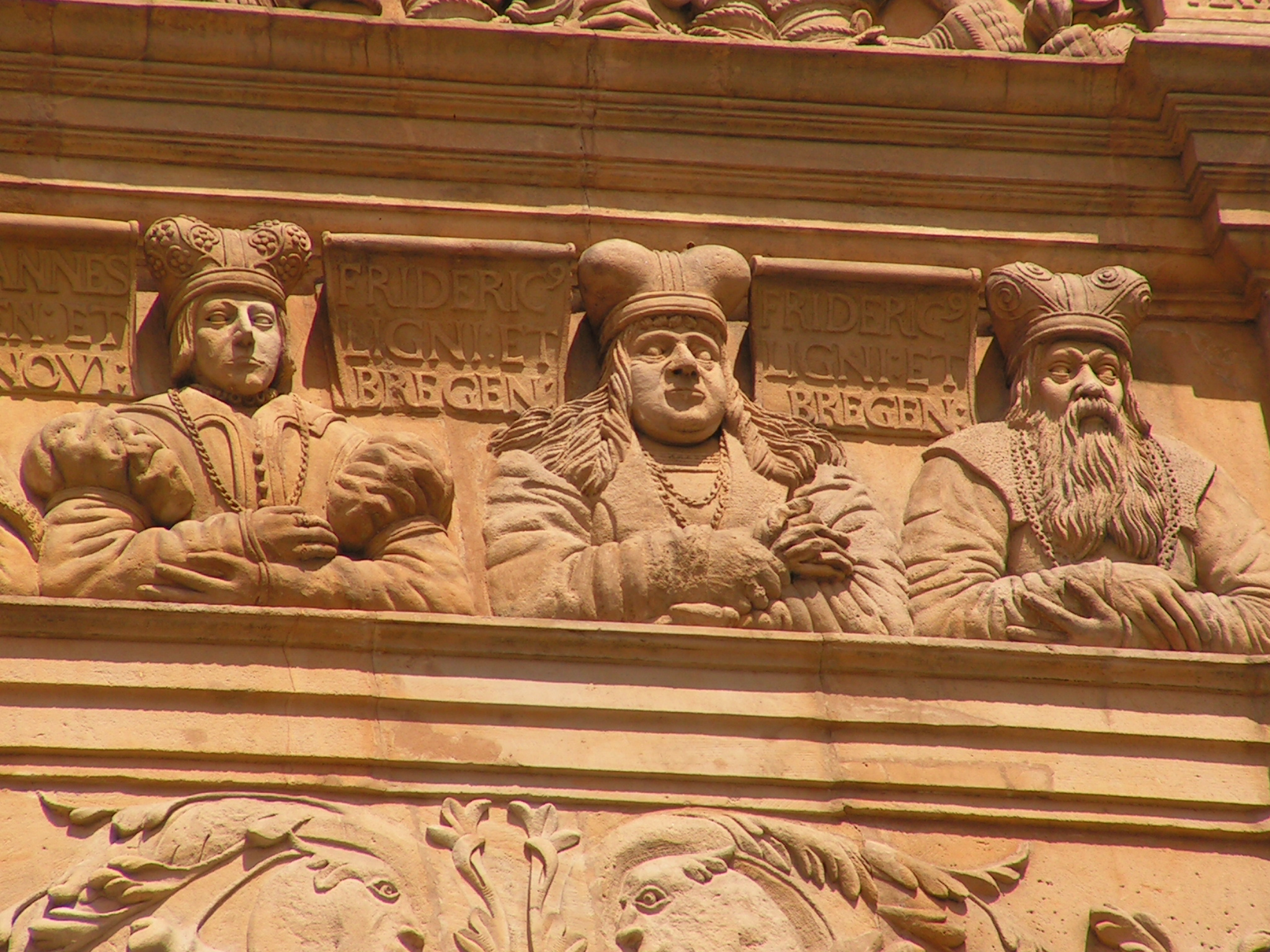
- John I, Frederick I, Frederick II.
- Born: 1425
- Died: after 21 November 1453
- Noble family: Silesian Piasts
- Spouse: Hedwig of Brieg
- Issue: Frederick I of Liegnitz
- Father: Louis III of Oława
- Mother: Margareta of Opole

John I, Duke of Lüben (1425 – after 21 November 1453), was a ruler of Lüben (Lubin) during 1441–1446 with his brother, as co-rulers, Haynau (Chojnów) since 1452, Brieg (Brzeg) and Goldberg (Złotoryja) during 1449–1450 with his brother, as co-rulers.

He was the eldest son of Louis III, Duke of Ohlau-Lüben-Haynau, by his wife Margaret, daughter of Duke Bolko IV of Oppeln.

== Life ==
After the death of his father in 1441, John I and his younger brother Henry X inherited the Duchies of Lüben and Haynau as co-rulers. Their mother, the Dowager Duchess Margareta, received the Duchy of Ohlau as a widow's land. In 1446, the difficult financial situation forced John I and Henry X to pledged Lüben to Duke Henry IX of Glogau.

The death of Elisabeth of Brandenburg, Dowager Duchess of Brieg-Liegnitz in 1449 left in jeopardy the future of the Duchy of Liegnitz. John I and Henry X were the legitimate heirs of that land, as grandsons of Duke Henry IX of Lüben, elder brother of Duke Louis II, Elisabeth's late husband, who left her Liegnitz and Brieg (already give by the Dowager Duchess to both brothers in 1443) in 1436; in addition, John I had another claim over Liegnitz through his marriage with Hedwig, youngest daughter of Louis II and Elisabeth. However, the brothers never took possession over the Duchy: shortly after Elisabeth's death, the local nobility rebelled against the Piast government and sought the help of Emperor Sigismund, who placed Liegnitz under the direct sovereignty of the Kingdom of Bohemia. One year later (1450) the still hard financial situation forced them to pledged Brieg to their maternal uncle, Duke Nicholas I of Oppeln.

In 1452 Henry X died without issue, leave John I as the sole ruler over Haynau; however, he died only eighteen months later.

== Marriage and issue ==
In February 1445 John I married Hedwig (b. ca. 1433 – d. 21 October 1471), daughter of Duke Louis II of Brieg. They had one son:

1. Frederick I (b. Brieg, 3 May 1446 – d. Liegnitz, 9 May 1488).

John I of Lüben House of Piast Born: 1425 Died: 1453
Preceded by Louis III	Duke of Lubin with Henry X 1441–1446	Succeeded by Henry IX
Preceded by Louis III	Duke of Chojnów with Henry X (until 1452); 1441–1453	Succeeded by Frederick I
Preceded by Elisabeth	Duke of Brzeg with Henry X 1443–1450	Succeeded by Nicholas I
