= Nicholas I of Opole =

Nicholas I of Opole (Polish: Mikołaj I; c. 1424 – 3 July 1476) was a duke of Opole since 1437 (until 1439 with his brother as co-ruler), Duke of Brzeg from 1450, ruler over Kluczbork from 1451 and Duke of Strzelce, Niemodlin and Olesno from 1460.

He was the fourth son of Duke Bolko IV of Opole by his wife Margareta, possibly member of the House of Gorizia.

== Life ==
At the time of his father's death in 1437 Nicholas I was still a minor, and therefore was placed under the care of his older brothers Bolko V and Jan I. On 6 October 1438 Nicholas I and his brothers paid homage to Casimir Jagiełło as King-elect of Bohemia, but after his resignation and the coronation of Albert of Habsburg as King, he paid homage again, this time to the Austrian ruler, during the Congress of Wrocław on 3 December 1438.

In 1439 Jan I died unexpectedly without issue, and Nicholas I inherited the whole Duchy of Opole. In 1443 Nicholas received as a pledge the Duchy of Brzeg from his nephews (sons of his sister), Dukes Jan I and Henry X of Lubin-Oława-Chojnów. For unknown reasons, in 1447 Jan I and Henry X recovered Brzeg and pledged it again, this time to the knight Heinz Stoschow. Only after a new settlement on 11 April 1450 did Brzeg finally return to the hands of the Duke of Opole.

A further enlargement of his domains took place in 1450, when his uncle Bernard, in exchange for a loan granted to Nicholas I his rights over his part of the Duchy of Opole and one year later (1451) he obtained Kluczbork. Finally, when his oldest brother Bolko V died without surviving male issue, all his possessions (Strzelce, Niemodlin and Olesno), where inherited by Nicholas I, who had to defend his rights against the Bohemian King George of Poděbrady, who claimed that as an emptied fiefs, Bolko V's lands would revert to Bohemia. The settlement between King George and Nicholas I was signed on 16 August 1460: the King finally accepted the rule of the Duke of Opole over Strzelce, Niemodlin and Olesno, but in exchange Nicholas I had to resign his claims over the Duchy of Opawa (he bought the Duchy in 1454 from his co-ruler Ernest, but as a result of the King's strong opposition, Nicholas I wasn't able to take effective control over this land).

Soon after, Nicholas I suffered further difficulties from his Silesian relatives, this time with Duke Jan IV of Oświęcim, who claimed the payment of all the debts of Nicholas I's late father-in-law, Duke Louis II of Brzeg. Jan IV managed to conquer the town of Leśnica, but finally he was expelled with the help of the Wrocław citizens on 6 October. In 1461 Nicholas I paid to Bolko V's widow Hedwig Beess of Kujawy an unspecified amount for damages in exchange for the resignation of her dower lands, and on 3 June of that year ended the long-lasting dispute with the local church, when Nicholas returned to them the goods stripped by Bolko V and reinitiated the building of the Kolegiata of Głogówek, which began during the rule of his father Bolko IV.

In 1463 the Duke Henry IX of Głogów revived his claims over the inheritance of his grandfather Władysław Opolczyk. On 26 October Henry IX, with the support of King George of Bohemia, obtained the annulment of the Decree granted by the Emperor Sigismund in 1435 and the validity of the decision of King Wenceslaus IV in 1418. Nicholas I, with the assistance of the Wrocław citizens initially attempted to make an armed resistance, but on 29 April 1464 was signed a definitive settlement between the Dukes of Opole and Głogów: under the terms of this treaty, Nicholas I was forced to pay the enormous amount of 14,000 Hungarian złoty. In the same year was also ended the dispute with the Bishopric of Wrocław when Nicholas I returned the town of Ujazd, conquered by Bolko V years before.

On 1 September 1466 Nicholas I and other Silesian rulers came up with the project to reconcile the Hussite King George of Bohemia with the Bishopric of Wrocław and Pope Paul II; however, due to rejection by the Catholic hierarchy, on 23 December the Bohemian King made the formal announcement of the war in Wrocław. In this new conflict Nicholas I wasn't too much involved and therefore the Pope's threats of excommunication had no effect on Opole.

On 8 June 1469 Nicholas I paid homage to King Matthias Corvinus in Wrocław. The attempts of the Duke of Opole to maintain neutrality during the war between King Matthias and Poland in 1471 failed, and under pressure from the Hungarian King, in 1473 Nicholas I led a military expedition against Duke Wenceslaus III of Rybnik, who was an ally of the Kingdom of Poland. In response, one year later (1474) Polish troops invaded the Duchy of Opole, which was substantially destroyed. Nicholas I was forced to flee to Wrocław under the protection of the Hungarian army.

During 1469–1472 Nicholas I entered into a successful dispute with his son-in-law, Duke Przemysław of Toszek over the possession of Łabędy, which is today part of Gliwice.

Nicholas I died on 3 July 1476 and was buried in the Franciscan monastery in Opole.

== Marriage and issue ==
By February 1442, Nicholas I married with Magdalena (ca. 1430 – 10 September 1497), daughter of Duke Louis II of Brzeg. They had ten children:

1. Margareta [Machna] (ca. 1450 – before 26 April 1472), married by 23 February 1463 to Duke Przemysław of Toszek.
2. Louis (1450 – before 4 September 1476).
3. Elizabeth (ca. 1452 – 29 August 1507), Abbess of St. Klara in Wrocław (1473).
4. Jan II the Good (ca. 1460 – 27 March 1532).
5. Nicholas II (by 1462 – 27 June 1497).
6. Magdalena (ca. 1463 – May 1501), married on 13 January 1478 to Duke Jan V of Racibórz.
7. Katharina (died 26 August 1507), a nun at St. Klara in Wrocław (1481).
8. Bolesław (died in infancy, before 27 January 1477).
9. Bernard (died in infancy, before 27 January 1477).
10. Elekta (died August 1507?), a nun at St. Klara in Wrocław.

Nicholas I's children were raised in the spirit of the Polish education. There are certain assumptions that Jan II and Nicholas II only knew the Polish language, which at that time, during the strong Germanization of Silesia, was looked down on.

Nicholas I of Opole House of Piast Born: c. 1424 Died: 3 July 1476
Regnal titles
Preceded by Bolko IV	Duke of Opole with Jan I (until 1439); 1437–1476	Succeeded by Louis; Jan II the Good; Nicholas II
Preceded by Jan I and Henry X	Duke of Brzeg; 1450–1476	Succeeded by Louis; Jan II the Good; Nicholas II
Preceded by Bolko V the Hussite	Duke of Strzelce; 1460–1476	Succeeded by Louis; Jan II the Good; Nicholas II
Preceded by Bolko V the Hussite	Duke of Niemodlin; 1460–1476	Succeeded by Louis; Jan II the Good; Nicholas II
