= Henryk X =

Henryk X may refer to

- Henry X, Duke of Haynau (1426 – before 28 May 1452)
- Henry X Rumpold (ca. 1390 – 1423)
