= Jan I of Opole =

Polish nobleman

Jan I
- Duke of Opole
- Coat of arms of Upper Silesia (Opole, Strzelce, etc)
- Born: 1410/13
- Died: 5 September 1439
- Noble family: Silesian Piasts of Strzelce
- Father: Bolko IV of Opole
- Mother: Margareta of Görz

Jan I of Opole (Polish: Jan I Opolski) (1410/13 – 5 September 1439) was a Duke of Opole since 1437 (with his brother as co-ruler).

He was the second son of Duke Bolko IV of Opole by his wife Margareta, possibly member of the House of Görz.

== Life ==
After his father's death in 1437, Jan I and his brother Nicholas I inherited the Duchy of Opole as co-rulers.

On 6 October 1438 Jan paid homage to Casimir Jagiełło as King-elect of Bohemia, but after his resignation and the coronation of Albert of Habsburg as King, he paid homage again, this time to the Austrian ruler (this was performed officially in Wrocław on 3 December 1438).

Jan I died on 5 September 1439 and the place of his burial is unknown. Because he never married or had children, all the Duchy was inherited by his brother Nicholas I.

Regnal titles
Preceded by Bolko IV	Duke of Opole with Nicholas I 1437–1439	Succeeded by Nicholas I
