= Rudy Kennedy =

British rocket scientist and Holocaust survivor

Rudy Kennedy (born Rudi Karmeinsky October 24, 1927 – November 10, 2008) was a British rocket scientist, Holocaust survivor, and a protester for Jewish causes. He spent a substantial period of his youth in Nazi concentration camps of Auschwitz, Mittelbau-Dora, and Bergen-Belsen. After liberation, he worked as a rocket scientist and led the campaign for compensation for the survivors of the German policy of "extermination through labour".

== Early life ==
Kennedy was born on October 24, 1927, in Rosenberg (now Olesno, Poland), a place near Breslau, Germany (now Wrocław, Poland). He was six years of age when Hitler was elected and had to face antisemitism and physical attacks from other boys when he went to school, as he was the only Jewish boy in class. After fighting back against boys from the school who had attacked him, Kennedy's father then enrolled him to an all-Jewish school in Breslau. Rudy's whole family, which consisted of his father Ewald, mother Adele and a younger sister Käthe, moved to Breslau in 1939. By 1941, Kennedy started working as an electrician with his father.

Rudy's family was forcibly relocated by the Schutzstaffel (SS) to Auschwitz concentration camp in 1943. At his father's direction, he lied about his age at the concentration camp—claiming to be 18 years of age although he was just 15. His sister and mother were immediately sent to a gas chamber and killed, while Rudy and his father were employed for work. Rudy's father was sent to IG Farben rubber factory, while Rudy was put to work on building roads (where the life expectancy was 6 weeks at most). Rudy's father managed to get him a job in the IG Farben factory where he quickly identified a fault with an electrical system and was kept on to work indoors working for Siemens. Two months later, Rudy's father was killed by the SS when he collapsed due to exhaustion and was deemed "unfit for work", sent to the camp hospital and given a phenol injection. Rudy endured cruel beatings at work and realized that he too would be killed if his work wasn't good enough.

As the Soviet Red Army approached, the SS evacuated the camp in January 1945. Rudy was sent to Mittelbau-Dora to work in a missile factory where he joined a group of prisoners who tried to hinder the production by urinating or throwing sand into the rocket guidance systems. In April 1945 he was sent to Bergen-Belsen where he was deprived of food and survived only by eating grass. Though the British liberated the camp, they didn't know what to do with the thousands of diseased prisoners, but they didn't want them to go out and mix with the general population. Rudy escaped from the camp with 5 other inmates and they made their way to Hannover.

He married Gitti and had two surviving children (Katie and Steve) at the time of his death.

== Post-World War II career as a rocket scientist ==
Rudy Karmeinsky had an aunt living in London and he emigrated to the United Kingdom in 1946. He took the surname of the British officer who had informed her about his survival. Rudy Kennedy attended college and started working for English Electric as a rocket scientist. He left the company to participate in a joint venture in rocketry and medical engineering with Rolf Schild and Peter Epstein, giving birth to Huntleigh Electronics, a £200 million company. Rudy set up his own company, named Digital Electronics in the 1970s. After selling Digital Electronics, he worked as a board member of Roche Pharmaceuticals.

== Campaign ==
Rudy founded Association of Claims for Jewish Slave Labour Compensation and led the campaign in the 1990s that put pressure on German companies that had co-operated with the Nazi's "Extermination through labor" program to admit responsibility and pay reparations to those who had been forced to work as slave laborers. A BBC Storyville documentary, I Was a Slave Labourer followed the progress of the campaign. Among the companies accused of complicit with the Nazi policy and targeted by the campaign were IG Farben, Volkswagen and Mercedes-Benz. The campaign group were approached by a firm of class-action lawyers who held that they could obtain damages in the US courts against the companies who were complicit with the Nazi policy. The lawsuit saw only partial success for the plaintiffs; the companies agreed to pay a maximum of £5,000 to each survivor for their sufferings in the concentration camps as "a goodwill gesture" without any legal responsibility to do so. Some of the American lawyers who originally promised to act free of charge, accepted millions of dollars for themselves. Kennedy was dissatisfied with the deal and continued campaigning, speaking at public meetings and protesting at IG Farben shareholder meetings until he started suffering from Alzheimer's.

In August 2000 the German Parliament passed a law to create the Foundation Remembrance, Responsibility and Future which provided individual humanitarian payments to former forced labourers and other victims of National Socialism. From 2001 to 2007 a total of € 4.4 billion was paid out to more than 1.66 million people in almost 100 countries.
