= Foundation Remembrance, Responsibility and Future =

The Foundation Remembrance, Responsibility and Future (German: Stiftung Erinnerung, Verantwortung und Zukunft; acronym EVZ) is a German Federal organisation with the purpose of making financial compensation available "to former forced laborers and to those affected by other injustices from the National Socialist period".

In 2025, the foundation was declared an undesirable organization in Russia.

== Background ==
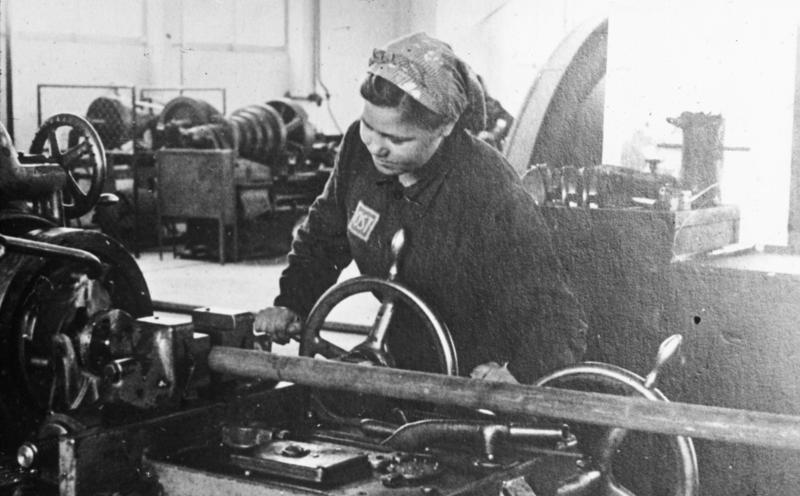
Ostarbeiter woman at the IG Farben plant Auschwitz

Throughout World War II about 8.4 million civilian forced laborers from all over Europe and 4.5 million prisoners of war were deployed as slave and forced laborers in Nazi concentration camps, labor camps or other places of detention for industrial, agricultural or public administrative purposes.

== The Foundation ==
=== Compensation ===
The foundation was established in August 2000 following several years of national and international negotiations in which the German government was represented by Otto Graf Lambsdorff. The Foundation's capital of DEM 10.1 billion (EUR 5.2 billion) was provided in equal amounts by 6,500 German companies to the German Industry Foundation Initiative and the German Federal Government.

The compensation payments were made in cooperation with international partner organisations in the respective countries or representing international organisations.

The Foundation is supervised by its Board of Trustees, comprising 27 members from various nations. Between 2001 and 2007 a total of EUR 4.4 billion was paid out to more than 1.66 million people in almost 100 countries.

Country	Partner Organisation	Number of recipients	total amount (million EUR)
Belarus and Estonia	Belarusian Foundation Understanding and Reconciliation	Belarus: 120,000; Estonia: 9,000	Belarus: 325; Estonia: 21
Czech Republic	The German-Czech Future Fund	76,000	210
Poland	Foundation Polish-German Reconciliation	484,000	979
Russia; Latvia, Lithuania and other former States of the Soviet Union	Russian Foundation Understanding and Reconciliation	Russia: 256,000; Latvia: 13,000; Lithuania: 12,000 other: 3,000	Russia: 426; Latvia: 23; Lithuania: 18 other: 5
Ukraine	Ukrainian National Foundation Understanding and Reconciliation	471,000	867
International	International Organization for Migration (IOM)	90,000	386
International	Conference on Jewish Material Claims Against Germany	159,000	1,149
total		1,665,000	4,400

The individual payments depended on different criteria such as

- the type of detention and its conditions
- the type of forced labor
- forced deportation

Inmates of a concentration camp, ghetto or those in similar conditions received a compensation of up to EUR 7,670.

Persons who were forcefully deported to Germany or German-occupied countries and lived in detention or similar conditions received a compensation of up to EUR 2,560. Persons who worked in agriculture received up to EUR 2,500.

=== The project's future ===
EUR 358 million of the Foundation's capital was allocated to a grant-giving foundation in order to provide project funding with an annual amount of EUR 8 million. This is primarily used to support international programmes and projects in

- critical examination of history,
- Working for human rights, and
- Commitment to the victims of National Socialism.

As of January 2008 the Foundation has spent EUR 34.3 million and has supported 1,300 projects worldwide since its foundation such as the "Train of Remembrance", a project to commemorate the role of the German railways in the Holocaust and the Leo Baeck-programme to raise the "awareness of the intellectual and cultural heritage of German-language Judaism in schools and universities".

== Related ==
Compensation to Germans used as forced labor after the war is not possible to claim in Germany, the possibility was removed by the statute of limitations since September 29, 1978.

== See also ==
- Wiedergutmachung
- Asian Women's Fund
- Rudy Kennedy
