= Margareta of Opole =

Polish princess (c. 1412–1454)

- Born: c. 1412/14
- Died: 15 January 1454
- Noble family: House of Piast
- Spouse: Louis III of Oława
- Father: Bolko IV of Opole
- Mother: Margareta

Margareta of Opole (Polish: Małgorzata; c. 1412/14 – 15 January 1454), was a Polish princess. She was a member of the Opole branch of House of Piast and by marriage a Duchess of Oława-Lubin-Chojnów.

She was the daughter of Duke Bolko IV of Opole, by his wife Margareta, possibly a member of the House of Görz.

== Life ==
Around 1423, Margareta (aged eleven) married her kinsman, Duke Louis III of Oława. They had two sons: John I and Henry X. On 18 January 1441 Louis III died, leaving the Duchies of Lubin and Chojnów to his sons as co-rulers and the Duchy of Oława to his widow as her dower.

Henry X died in 1452 and was succeeded by his brother and co-ruler John I in Chojnów (Lubin was already pledged to the Dukes of Głogów in 1446); however, John I died one year later (1453), leaving from his marriage with Hedwig of Brzeg a son, Frederick I, now the only male representative of the Brzeg-Legnica branch.

Margareta survived her son John I by only two months. Oława was inherited by her grandson Frederick I, who eventually reunited all the family lands in 1488.

Margareta of Opole House of Piast Born: c. 1412/14 Died: 15 January 1454
Preceded by Louis III	Duke of Oława; 1441–1454	Succeeded by Frederick I
