= Bolko V the Hussite =

Bolko V the Hussite (Polish: Bolko V Husyta) (c. 1400 – 29 May 1460) was a Duke of Opole between 1422–1424 (as a co-ruler with his father), ruler over Głogówek and Prudnik since 1424, Duke of Strzelce and Niemodlin from 1450 and ruler over Olesno since 1455.

He was the eldest son of Duke Bolko IV of Opole by his wife Margareta, possibly member of the House of Görz. Through his marriage to Elizabeth of Granowo he became stepson-in-law to King of Poland, Władysław Jagiełło.

== Life ==
At a young age, Bolko V was sent to the University of Prague, where he learned of the social and religious views of Jan Hus. Soon after (probably before 1417) he returned to Upper Silesia and probably in 1417 or 1418 married with Elizabeth (d. aft. 2 September 1452), daughter of Wincenty Granowski (d. 1410) by his wife Elisabeth of Pilica, who had recently become Queen of Poland after her marriage to King Władysław II Jagiełło. The wedding with the King's stepdaughter brought to the Dukes of Opole the immense wealth of the Pilica family and the alliance with the royal court at Wawel Castle.

In 1422 Bolko V was named by his father as co-ruler of the Duchy of Opole, and two years later (1424), thanks to the resignation of both his father and uncle Bernard, he became the independent ruler over Głogówek and Prudnik.

In 1428 Silesia was invaded by Hussite troops. In the capital of his domains, Głogówek, Bolko V decided at first to fight against them. However, almost immediately, the young Duke, at that time in Gliwice, not only decided to admit the Hussites into his city in order to avoid the destruction of his duchy, but also took the occasion to enrich himself with the secularization of the local churches (one of his first decisions was the cancellation of the building of a Kolegiata in Głogówek, which began by orders of Bolko IV). After a solemn oath, Bolko V vowed to support the Hussites, and he sent his army to help them. The cooperation with the Hussites was not just material, but also ideological. One aim of the duke was the policy of a gradual Germanization of Silesia, and the national teachings of Jan Hus fit in with this purpose. Later in that year, Bolko V took over all the goods of the Church in his Duchy.

In 1429 with the Hussites involved on other fronts, Bolko V acquired for himself the neighboring Duchy of Nysa, which belonged to the Bishopric of Wrocław. In the following year, together with his allies, he forced Polish troops to retreat to Jasna Góra, which become the new Silesian-Poland frontier. He also tried to obtain some lands from the Dukes of Brzeg: Namysłów (who could defend himself thanks to the help of the citizens of Wrocław) and Kluczbork (which was taken by him). In the following years Bolko V became the ruler of almost all Upper Silesia and parts of Lower Silesia. In his conquests, Bolko V could count on the support of his closest relatives, his father Bolko IV and his uncle Bernard. His luck turned against him on 13 May 1433, in connection with his defeat at the Battle of Trzebnica against Nicholas V, Duke of Krnov. Despite this, Bolko V managed to maintain until his death the majority of Church goods obtained after the secularization. For this, in 1443 he was excommunicated.

During 1444–1452 Bolko V led a fight against the Bishop of Kraków, Zbigniew Oleśnicki, over the buying of the Duchy of Siewierz. This war resulted in significant destruction on the Silesian-Lesser Poland frontier. The Emperor Frederick III feared a complete collapse of the Silesian states. The dispute only ended in 1452 during the Polish Sejm in Piotrków, where Bolko V even offered the Polish King Casimir IV financial assistance for a war against the Teutonic Order in exchange for the district of Wieluń as a lien (the proposal wasn't accepted).

Prior to that, in 1450 Bolko V's uncle Bernard, lacking male descendants, decided to give most of his estate to him, including the Duchies of Strzelce and Niemodlin. Five years later (1455), Bolko V received Olesno after the death of Bernard.

In 1451, Bolko V divorced his wife Elizabeth Granowska after almost thirty-three years of marriage. This union only produced a son, Wenceslaus (b. 1433 – d. bef. 14 March 1453), whose early death was a terrible blow to Bolko V. He never recovered from the loss.

On 27 June 1451, Bolko V married for the second time, to Hedwig (d. aft. 1 February 1461), daughter of Hincze Beess of Kujawy, a member of the local nobility. This union was childless.

Bolko V died on 29 May 1460 in his favorite residence, Głogówek, and was buried in the local Franciscan church. Without surviving male heirs, he was succeeded in all his domains by his only surviving brother, Nicholas I.

== Footnotes ==
Regnal titles
Preceded by Bernard	Duke of Strzelce; 1450–1460	Succeeded by Nicholas I
Preceded by Bernard	Duke of Niemodlin; 1450–1460	Succeeded by Nicholas I
