= Franciszek Kokot =

Polish endocrinologist and nephrologist (1929–2021)

Franciszek Kokot (24 November 1929 – 24 January 2021) was a Polish nephrologist and endocrinologist. He was known as a pioneer of nephrology in Eastern Europe. Kokot was a full member of the Polish Academy of Sciences, having previously served as its rector.

== Biography ==
Kokot was born in Rosenberg O.S., Germany (today Olesno in Poland). He studied medicine from 1948 to 1953 in the Silesian School of Medicine in Katowice. He then worked as a technician and became an expert in radio-immune assays. This enabled him to enter the Department of Pharmacology of the Silesian School of Medicine where he completed a period of training in Internal Medicine.

He was one of the first individuals to study abnormalities of volume regulating hormones and of volume status in acute kidney injury, and one of the first to document abnormalities in humans with renal ischemia, particularly renal artery stenosis. He was also a pioneer in studying in great detail the reversal of hormonal abnormalities of patients with endstage kidney disease by renal transplantation.

Kokot died from COVID-19 complications in January 2021, aged 91.

== Awards and honors ==
- Honorary member of 14 European societies of nephrology;
- Volhard Golden Medal of the Gesellschaft für Nephrologie;
- Member of the Ordo Sanctus Silvestri Papae by Pope John Paul II;
- Fellow of the Royal College of Physicians of Edinburgh;
- Doctor honoris causa of ten Universities (Wrocław, Katowice, Szczecin, Kosice, Lublin, Warsaw, Cracow, Białystok, Łódź and Opole).
