= Henryk IX Starszy =

- Duke of Żagań-Głogów
- Born: between 1387 and 1392
- Died: 11 November 1467; Krosno
- Noble family: Silesian Piasts of Głogów
- Spouse: Jadwiga of Oleśnica
- Issue: Zygmunt; Henry XI of Głogów; Anna; A son Hedwig; Katharina
- Father: Henry VIII the Sparrow
- Mother: Katharina of Opole

Henryk IX Starszy (literally 'Henry IX the Elder'; probably between 1387 and 1392 – 11 November 1467) was Duke of Żagań-Głogów from 1397 to 1412 (as co-ruler with his brother), ruler of Szprotawa, Krosno Odrzańskie from 1412 to 1417, Świebodzin and half of Głogów (with his brothers as co-rulers), from 1417 ruler of Szprotawa, half of Głogów, from 1420 ruler of Kożuchów and Zielona Góra, from 1430 ruler of Krosno Odrzańskie and Świebodzin, and from 1446 Duke of Lubin.

He was the second son of Henry VIII the Sparrow, Duke of Głogów, by his wife Katharina, daughter of Duke Władysław of Opole.

== Life ==
After the death of his father in 1397, the widowed Duchess Katharina moved with her children to Kożuchów, which together with Zielona Góra was her dower. Between 1397 and 1401 Duke Rupert I of Legnica was in charge of the princes and the duchy. This was a difficult task, as Henryk VIII had left his lands in a difficult financial situation. Rupert I gradually began to pay off Henryk VIII's creditors and improve the general situation of the duchy. The regent gave special aid to the duchy's main towns: Głogów, Krosno Odrzańskie and Szprotawa.

When his older brother Jan I came of age in 1401, he assumed guardianship of his younger brothers and full government of the duchy. In 1403 the brothers received the lands of their uncle, Henry VI the Elder, on the resignation of his widow, Hedwig of Legnica, who had ruled them as a dower since 1393. The formal division of the duchy took place in 1412: Henryk IX together with his brothers Henry X Rumpold and Wenceslaus received the Duchy of Głogów (which included half of Głogów, Świebodzin, Krosno Odrzańskie and Szprotawa).

In 1417 a new partition treaty was signed, this time in the Duchy of Głogów: Henryk IX and Henryk X Rumpold kept Głogów and Szprotawa, but gave their younger brother Wenceslaus the towns of Świebodzin, Krosno Odrzańskie and Bytnica (these areas were returned to him after Wenceslaus's death in 1431). Henryk IX and Henry X Rumpold ruled together, but the government remained in the hands of Henryk IX. Henry X Rumpold remained in the service of the Kings of Bohemia and Hungary and of the Emperor Sigismund, on whose orders he fought against the Hussites and undertook diplomatic missions to Denmark, where he died in 1423 shortly before marrying a relative of King Eric. After his brother's death, Henryk IX ruled the duchy alone. He had previously received the towns of Kożuchów and Zielona Góra on the death of his mother in 1420, but this inheritance did not meet with the approval of his older brother Jan I and led to a brief war between the sons of Henry VIII. The conflict was successfully ended by Henryk IX, who was able to keep the towns (the dispute was eventually settled by Elector Rudolf III of Saxony, who left both princes with their lands intact).

According to contemporary chronicles, Henryk IX was a mild man of peaceful disposition. In his youth he was proposed as Bishop of Wroclaw, but he did not accept. During his reign the turbulent Hussite Wars took place, in which the Duchy of Silesia was involved, but he managed to keep peace in Głogów.

In 1416 Henryk IX mediated in a dispute between the sons of Przemyslaus I Noszak, Duke of Cieszyn. In 1420 the Great Congress of Silesian Princes was held in Wrocław. The princes paid tribute to the Emperor Sigismund. In 1423, together with his brother Jan I and other Silesian princes, Henryk IX attended the Congress of Pressburg (now Bratislava), where he discussed the further division of Poland with the Teutonic Order and the Lusatian towns. Special emphasis was placed on renouncing the policy of King Władysław II Jogaila of Poland, who supported the Hussite rebels.

Collaboration with the House of Luxembourg enabled Henryk IX to obtain parts of the inheritance of his maternal grandfather, Władysław of Opole, but economic instability and the subservience of the Dukes Bernard of Niedmolin (Falkenberg) and Bolko IV of Opole finally convinced the Emperor on 16 September 1435 to confirm the decision in favour of the Dukes of Opole taken at an arbitration in Prague on 2 July 1417, which obliged Henryk IX to return to the Dukes of Opole the lands taken from him.

In the early months of 1425, the Hussite retaliatory expedition to Silesia began to be organised. The reaction of the Silesian rulers varied: some of them let the Hussites pass (such as Bolko V the Hussite), while others, such as Henryk IX, fought against them The entry of the Hussite troops into the Duchy of Głogów caused great destruction. Henryk IX sought the help of the Polish king, Wladyslaw II Jogaila. In return for the king's protection against the Hussites, he made him his heir, but these efforts did not produce any major results. The next Hussite invasion in 1431 was repelled by Henryk IX. In 1433 he took part in the war against the Hussites with troops from Poland and the Teutonic Order.

In the next war against Bohemia in 1438–1439, Henryk IX supported Albert V of Habsburg and paid homage to him on 3 December 1438. Early the following year, despite having a much smaller army, he managed to repel the Greater Poland troops at the Odra River crossings.

Henryk IX's reputation in Silesia was enormous; in September 1444, for example, he acted as a mediator in the conflict between the dukes of Oleśnica. Two years later, in 1446, he was able to take control of Lubin when its rulers, Dukes Jan I and Henryk X, pledged the land to him.

On 19 April 1458, Henryk IX joined the alliance of Silesian princes and cities against the new Bohemian king, George of Poděbrady. However, after the general recognition of the new Bohemian ruler in the following year, he finally paid homage to him in Świdnica. The formal investiture of King George of the Duchy of Opole took place on 26 October 1463. However, in the face of strong opposition from both Dukes Henryk IX and Nicholas I, on 29 April 1464 the king finally decided to compromise and renounced all his claims to Opole in exchange for 14,000 pieces of gold.

During his reign, Głogów witnessed important events: on 17 May 1462, King Casimir IV of Poland and King George of Bohemia met in the city. They agreed that after George's death the Bohemian throne could pass to Casimir IV's son. During this important meeting, the disputes between Poland and the Duchy of Głogów were also discussed. All disputes between them were settled after another congress in Babimost and Gościkowo (Paradyż).

Despite his fruitful cooperation with the Bohemian king, Henryk IX was excommunicated by the Pope on 23 December for accepting the nomination of the Polish prince as heir to Bohemia.

At the end of his reign, Henryk IX concentrated all his energies on his war against his nephew Jan II the Mad, in order to restore the Duchy of Żagań to his eldest nephew and Jan II's brother, Balthasar.

At present there is little information about the governmental activities of Henryk IX. However, new laws, decrees, etc. were issued by him in Głogów. Economic problems continued during this period.

Henryk died on 11 November 1467 in Krosno Odrzańskie and was buried in the mission chapel in Kożuchów.

== Marriage and issue ==
By 1432, probably no later than 1423, Henryk IX married Jadwiga (died by 25 June 1447 – 1453), daughter of Konrad III the Old, Duke of Oleśnica.

They had six children:

1. Zygmunt (1431 or 1432 – 24 December 1458).
2. Henryk XI (after 1428 – 22 February 1476).
3. Anna (probably 1430-1440 – 17 December 1483), married Jan II of Rosenberg in 1454.
4. A son (before 30 May 1447 – before 11 November 1467).
5. Hedwig (c. 1450 – by 30 May 1482).
6. Katharina (before 1454 – after 14 November 1497).

In a will written in 1447, he left the duchy to his three sons as joint rulers. There was an entry in the will expressing the wish that the duchy should not be divided for 20 years. His heirs were not allowed to consult foreign advisers. This was to ensure the unity of Głogów. However, the early deaths of two of his sons averted the threat of further divisions, and the entire Duchy of Głogów passed to his only surviving son, Henry XI, the last male member of his line.

== Footnotes ==
Henryk IX Starszy House of Piast Born: c. 1389 Died: 11 November 1467
Preceded by Henry VIII	Duke of Glogów (1/2); 1397–1467 with Jan I (1397-1412); Henry X (1397-1423); Wenceslaus (1397-1417)	Succeeded by Henry XI
Preceded by Jan I Henry X	Duke of Lubin; 1446–1467	Succeeded by Henry XI
Preceded by Hedwig	Duke of Żagań; 1403–1412 with Jan I Henry X Wenceslaus	Succeeded by Jan I
