= Byczyna Town Hall =

Coordinates: 51.1140°N 18.2140°E

Ratusz w Byczynie (Byczyna Town Hall)
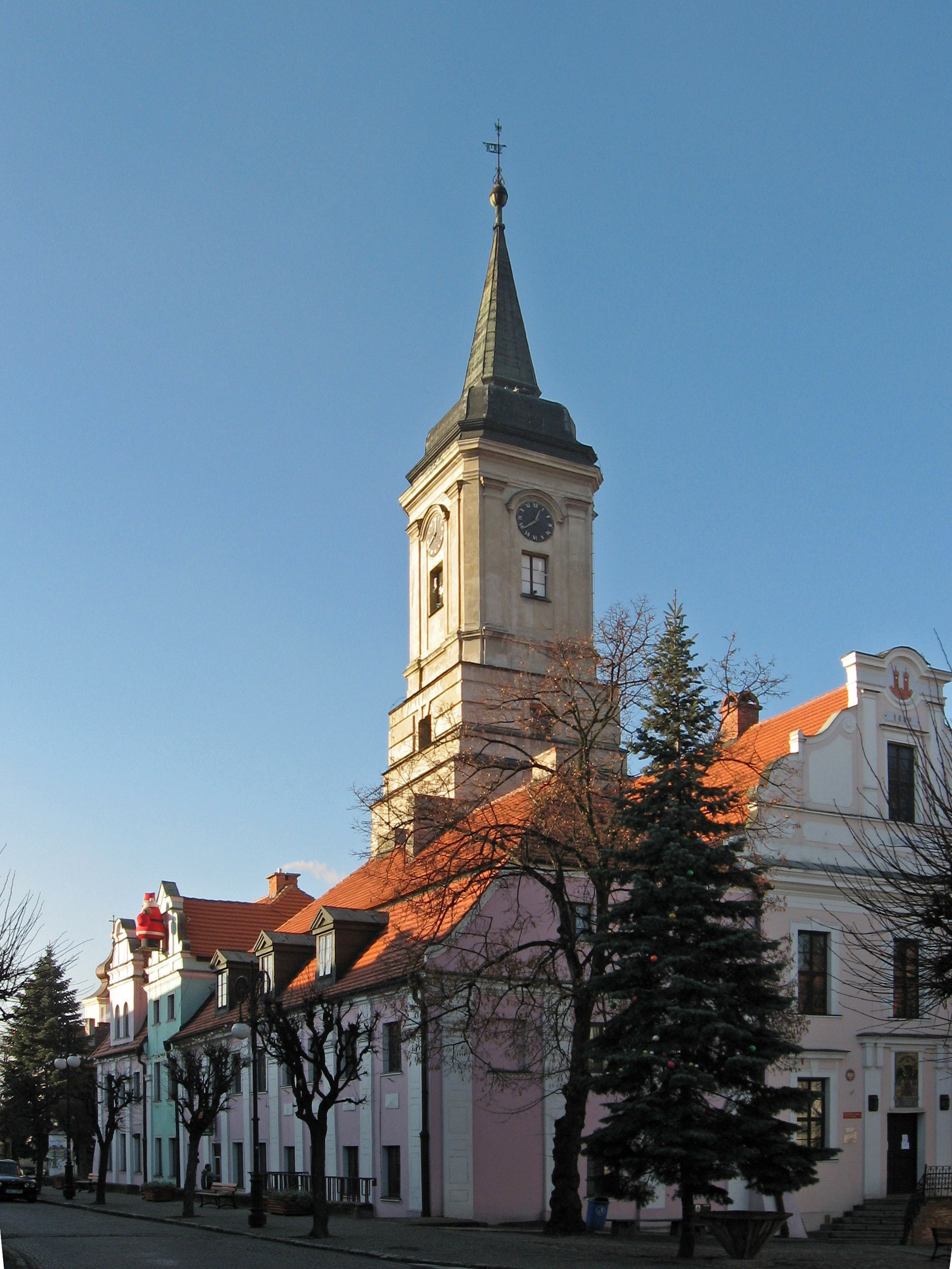
- Byczyna Town Hall
- Interactive map of the Ratusz w Byczynie (Byczyna Town Hall) area

General information
- Type: Town hall, museum
- Architectural style: Baroque, Classicism
- Location: Byczyna, Poland
- Completed: 1766

Design and construction
- Architect: Jan Pohlmann

Byczyna Town Hall is a town hall built in the Baroque and Classical architectural style in Byczyna, Poland. In later years the building was modernised, during World War II the building was destroyed and subsequently rebuilt. The current tenants of the building are the Byczyna City Council, pharmacy, and a café.

== History ==
The first town hall located in Byczyna was built in the fifteenth century, and later destroyed in town fires in 1719 and 1757. The current town hall was built in 1766, during reconstructions made by the royal inspectorate Jan Marcin Pohlmann. During the build of the town hall, the surrounding town houses were also built. In 1899, the seat of the Byczyna City Council was reconstructed. The town hall was destroyed during World War II, and reconstructed into its former structure in 1968.
