= John Herbinius =

John Herbinius (1632–1676) was a German writer and naturalist especially known for examining and explaining the principles of Cataracts in rivers.

== Biography ==
He was born at Bitschen in the Duchy of Brieg in 1632. He studied at the University of Wittemberg, before being appointed as a Rector of the school in Bitschen and later in the city of Wohlau.

In 1663, he went to Bojanowo in Poland to found an evangelical school of the Protestant Churches of the Augsburg Confession (in Poland). He solicited on their behalf pecuniary assistance from the other Lutheran Churches; hence, he travelled through Germany, the Dutch Republic, Switzerland, France, Denmark, Sweden, and Ukraine. This employment of travel through several countries gave him an opportunity to examine Natural history of the countries he passed through; furthermore, he was employed specifically, to examine and explain the principles of Cataracts and Waterfalls; accordingly, he published De Admirandis Mundi Cataractis,, Kiovia subterranea, and Terrse motus et quietis exarnen.

He was engaged as a Chaplain at Stockholm by Swedish ambassador to Poland, and later been appointed as a minister of the Lutheran Church at Wilna and Graudenz in Prussia. He authored several publications and died at an age of 44 in 1676.

== Bibliography ==
- Terrse motus et quietis exarnen, 1655.
- Disputatio de Fœminarum illustrium Eruditione, 1657.
- Calendæ festivæ Anni 1667, 1667
- Tragicocomcedia, et Ludi innocui de Juljano Imperatore Apostata, 1668.
- Admiranda Michaelis Koributhi in Regem Poloniæ Electio, 1669
- De statu Ecclesiarum Augustanae confessionis in Polonia, 1670.
- Religiosæ Kijovienses cryptæ, sive Kijovia subterranea, 1675.
- De Admirandis Mundi Cataractis, 1678.
- Disputatio de Paradiso.
