= Rupert II of Lubin =

Rupert II
- Duke of Lubin, Chojnów; Knight of the Order of St. John
- Coat-of-arms of Silesian Piasts.
- Born: 1396/1402
- Died: 24 August 1431
- Noble family: Silesian Piasts
- Father: Henry IX of Lüben
- Mother: Anna of Cieszyn

Rupert II of Lüben (Polish: Ruprecht II lubiński) (1396/1402 – 24 August 1431) was a Duke of Lubin (Lüben) and Chojnów (Haynau) from 1419/20 until his death.

He was the eldest son of Henry IX, Duke of Lubin, and his wife Anna, daughter of Przemyslaus I Noszak, Duke of Cieszyn.

== Life ==
After the death of his father between 1419 and 1420 (the exact date was still debatable), Rupert inherited the Duchies of Lubin and Chojnów. His younger brothers Wenceslaus III and Louis III inherited the Duchies of Oława (Ohlau) and Niemcza jointly as co-rulers.

In 1422 he was named Knight of the Order of Malta in Poland, Bohemia and Moravia.

After his death without issue, Rupert II's duchies were inherited by his younger surviving brother Louis III.

Preceded by Henry IX	Duke of Lubin; 1419/20–1431	Succeeded by Louis III
Preceded by Henry IX	Duke of Chojnów; 1419/20–1431	Succeeded by Louis III
