= Wenceslaus III of Oława =

Wenceslaus III
- Duke of Oława
- Coat-of-arms of Silesian Piasts
- Born: 1400
- Died: between 14 January and 28 May 1423
- Noble family: Silesian Piasts
- Father: Henry IX of Lüben
- Mother: Anna of Cieszyn

Wenceslaus III of Oława (Polish: Wacław III oławski) (1400 – between 14 January and 28 May 1423), was a Duke of Oława (Ohlau) since 1419–20 until his death.

He was the second son of Henry IX, Duke of Lubin, by his wife Anna, daughter of Przemyslaus I Noszak, Duke of Cieszyn.

== Life ==
After the death of his father between 1419 and 1420, Wenceslaus III and his younger brother Louis III inherited the Duchies of Oława and Niemcza jointly as a co-rulers, His older brother Rupert II received the Duchies of Lubin and Chojnów.

He never married or had issue. On his death, his brother Louis III became in the sole ruler over Oława and Niemcza.

| Preceded by Henry IX | Duke of Oława with Louis III; 1419/20–1423 | Succeeded by Louis III |
