= Henry IX of Lubin =

Henry IX
- Duke of Brzeg, Lubin, Chojnów, Oława
- Born: 1369
- Died: between 9 January 1419 and 10 July 1420
- Noble family: Silesian Piast
- Spouse: Anna of Cieszyn
- Issue: Rupert II; Wenceslaus III; Katharina; Anna; Hedwig; Louis III
- Father: Henry VII of Brzeg
- Mother: Helena of Orlamünde

Henry IX of Lubin (Polish: Henryk ; 1369 – between 9 January 1419 and 10 July 1420), was a Duke of Brzeg (Brieg) during 1399–1400 with his brother and since 1400, Duke of Lubin (Lüben), Chojnów (Haynau) and Oława (Ohlau).

He was the eldest son of Henry VII with a Scar, Duke of Brzeg, by his first wife Helena, the daughter of Otto V, Count of Orlamünde.

== Life ==
=== Childhood and Youth ===
Henry IX was his parents' only child. His mother died prematurely in 1369, shortly after his birth, perhaps even during the childbirth. The prince grew in the intellectual and artistic court of his grandfather, Louis I the Fair. He took part in the many scientific disputes, sumptuous feasts and balls, theatrical presentations and also knight tournaments. Louis I's library was one of the most extensive in Europe. The Duke, who was a renowned patron of the arts and culture, cared intensely about the education of his heirs.

In 1379, Henry IX's father remarried. His new wife was Margareta of Masovia, daughter of Duke Siemowit III and widow of Casimir IV of Pomerania. From this union, Henry IX gained two half-siblings: Louis II and Margareta. Despite the considerable age difference between them, the brothers had a warm and close relationship for many years until the succession war at the beginning of the 15th century.

On 5 July 1396 Louis I the Fair give Henry IX the towns of Kluczbork, Byczyna and Wołczyn, on occasion of his betrothal with Anna of Cieszyn, daughter of Duke Przemyslaus I Noszak; but was only on 29 September (nine days after the marriage ceremony) when he was confirmed with the formal possession of their domains, who produced a rent of 2,000 fines. In the marriage contract, was also stipulated that lands became dower of the bride. A few months later, Duke Louis I give his grandson the half of the rents of the towns of Brzeg, Wierzbno and Oława.

=== Beginning of Rule ===
On 6/23 December 1398 Louis I the Fair died, and was succeeded by his son Henry VIII, who died only eight months later, on 11 July 1399. Both brothers Henry IX and Louis II inherited the Duchy of Brieg and became co-rulers, but in October 1400 they decided to divided their lands. Henry IX took the districts of Lubin (Lüben), Chojnów (Haynau) and Oława (Ohlau), and Louis II took Brzeg (Brieg).

On 17 July 1402 the two brothers appeared in a meeting of Piast Dukes in Wrocław, which concluded with each other and the other Dukes a defensive alliance and paid homage to King Wenceslaus IV.

=== Captivity of Louis II by the Saracens ===
In 1404 Louis II went on a pilgrimage to the Holy Land, during which he was imprisoned by the Saracens. The unfortunate news reached to Brzeg only until the end of the year. Henry IX, in order to reunited the ransom for his brother, imposed to the inhabitants of Brzeg, as well of his own subjects of Chojnów and Oława an additional tax. The needed sum of 4,000 fines was collected shortly after; however, Louis II wasn't returned to Silesia until the end of 1405. During his captivity, Henry IX held the regency over the Duchy of Brzeg.

=== War against Louis II. Death ===
In March 1409 Duke Wenceslaus II of Legnica, Bishop of Wrocław, declared Louis II as his heir over the Duchy of Legnica and the half of Złotoryja. The rights over the other half of Złotoryja and a rent of 6,000 fines were assigned to Henryk IX. Wenceslaus II also decided also that both brothers had the option to take control over all Złotoryja if one pay the other in compensation. In the same year Louis II purchased to Henry IX his part of Złotoryja. At this point, the Duke of Lubin (already infuriated by the favoritism of Wenceslaus II over Louis II) and his younger brother broke their friendly relations. Soon the dispute turned into an open war, issued by Henry IX, which is going during the years 1411-1414. The war continue despite the mediation of Wenceslaus II, who tried to persuade Henry IX to stop. The dispute only ended thanks to the action of King Wenceslaus IV, who forbade his vassals to fight. The brothers were finally reconciled and issued a document on mutual help. The residents of the Duchy of Legnica-Złotoryja were obliged to paid homage to both Dukes. Henry IX died between 1419 and 1420. The place of his burial is unknown.

== Marriage and issue ==
On 20 September 1396 Henry IX married with Anna (bef. 1374 – 8 July bef. 1405/1420?), daughter of Przemysław I Noszak, Duke of Cieszyn. They had six children:

1. Rupert II (1396/1402 – 24 August 1431)
2. Wenceslaus III (1400 – 14 January/28 May 1423)
3. Katharina (1400 – July 1424), married on 1 August 1423 to Albert III, Count of Lindow-Ruppin
4. Anna (bef. 1403 – aft. 13 November 1420)
5. Hedwig (bef. 1404 – aft. 4 February 1432), Canoness at Trebnitz (1416)
6. Louis III (bef. 1405 – bef. 18 June 1441)

Preceded by Henry VII with a Scar	Duke of Brzeg with Louis II; 1399–1400	Succeeded by Louis II
New creation	Duke of Lubin; 1400–1419/20	Succeeded by Rupert II
New creation	Duke of Chojnów; 1400–1419/20	Succeeded by Rupert II
New creation	Duke of Oława; 1400–1419/20	Succeeded by Wenceslaus III and Louis III
