= Ludwik III of Oława =

Polish noble

Louis III of Oława
- Duke of Oława, Lubin, Chojnów
- Coat-of-arms of Silesian-Piasts
- Born: before 1405
- Died: before 18 June 1441
- Noble family: Silesian Piasts
- Spouse: Margareta of Opole
- Issue: Jan I Henry X
- Father: Henry IX of Lüben
- Mother: Anna of Cieszyn

Louis III of Oława, mostly known as of Lüben (Polish: Ludwik; before 1405 – before 18 June 1441), was a Duke of Oława (Ohlau) from 1419 to 1420 and Duke of Lubin (Lüben) and Chojnów (Haynau) from 1431 until his death.

He was the third and youngest son of Henry IX, Duke of Lubin, by his wife Anna, daughter of Przemyslaus I Noszak, Duke of Cieszyn.

== Life ==
After the death of his father in 1419 or 1420, Louis III succeeded him in the duchies of Oława and Niemcza together with his older brother Wenceslaus III as co-ruler. The death of Wenceslaus III in 1423 without issue left him as sole ruler of their duchies.

In 1431, after the death of his oldest brother Rupert II (who, like Wenceslaus III, never married or had children), Louis III inherited his Duchies of Lubin and Chojnów.

== Marriage and issue ==
By 1423, Louis III married Margareta (b. 1412 or 1414 – d. 15 January 1454), daughter of Duke Bolko IV of Opole. They had two sons:

1. Jan I (b. 1425 – d. aft. 21 November 1453).
2. Henry X (b. 1426 – d. bef. 28 May 1452).

On his death, he left the Duchy of Oława to his wife as dower. She ruled it until her own death.

Ludwik III of Oława House of Piast Born: before 1405 Died: before 18 June 1441
Preceded by Henry IX	Duke of Oława; 1419/20–1441; With: Wenceslaus III (until 1423)	Succeeded by Margareta
Preceded by Rupert II	Duke of Lubin; 1431–1441	Succeeded by Jan I and Henry X
Preceded by Rupert II	Duke of Chojnów; 1431–1441	Succeeded by Jan I and Henry X
