= Bolko IV of Opole =

Bolko IV
- Duke of Strzelce, Niemodlin, Opole
- Coat-of-arms of Upper Silesia (Opole, Strzelce, Niemodlin, etc)
- Born: 1363/67
- Died: 6 May 1437
- Noble family: Silesian Piasts of Opole
- Spouse: Margareta (of Görz?)
- Issue: Bolko V the Hussite; Jan I of Opole; Margareta of Opole; Henry; Nicholas I of Opole
- Father: Bolko III of Strzelce
- Mother: Anna (of Oświęcim?)

Bolko IV of Opole (Polish: Bolko IV opolski; 1363/67 – 6 May 1437), was a Duke of Strzelce and Niemodlin during 1382–1400 (with his brothers as co-rulers), Duke of Opole from 1396 (until 1400 with his brother as co-ruler, except Olesno).

He was the second son of Duke Bolko III of Strzelce by his wife Anna, probably daughter of Duke Jan I of Oświęcim.

== Life ==
At the time of his father's death in 1382 Bolko IV was still a minor and therefore was placed under the care of his older brother Jan Kropidło and his uncle Władysław Opolczyk.

At first, Bolko IV and his brothers inherited a small Duchy, but shortly after his father's death and in accordance with a previous agreement, they took possession of the Duchy of Niemodlin after the death of his relative Henry, but without Głogówek, which was retained by Władysław Opolczyk.

The relationship between uncle and nephews was initially good. In 1383 Władysław Opolczyk sold part of his domains, and ten years later (1393), in exchange for taking part in the war against the Polish King Władysław II Jagiełło, the Duke of Opole promised to them the succession of all his heritage, except the lands which were assigned to his wife Euphemia as her dower. This decision provoked a violent response by the Polish army, which attacked the cities of Strzelce and Opole.

On 6 August 1396, Bolko III's sons decided to make an agreement with the Polish King and invaded Opole; after that, they were the effective rulers over the Duchy and Władysław Opolczyk was relegated to a second plan until his death in 1401.

In 1400 Bolko IV and Bernard decided to make the formal division of their domains between them (the older brother Jan Kropidło wasn't counted because he followed a Church career in Poland, and the other brother, Henry II, died in 1394): Bolko IV retained Opole and Bernard received Strzelce and Niemodlin. In 1401 Bolko IV waived to his brother the recently recovered lands of Olesno and Lubliniec.

Bolko IV tried to maintain close contacts with King Wenceslaus IV of Bohemia. For this reason, on 7 July 1402 the Duke of Opole joined the confederation of Silesian states.

In 1417 the case over the inheritance of Władysław Opolczyk was unexpectedly revived. The Dukes Jan I and Henry IX of Żagań claimed rights from their mother Katharina of Opole, daughter of Władysław Opolczyk. For unknown reasons the Prague court on 2 July 1417 gave an extremely negative sentence to the Dukes of Opole, requiring the return of their domains to the Dukes of Żagań; one year later, on 1 April 1418, this decision was confirmed by King Wenceslas IV. Only the sudden death of the Bohemian King less than a year later and the inability of the Dukes of Żagań to exploit their opportunities permitted Bolko IV to retain his lands.

In subsequent years, and despite the previous difficulties with the Bohemian Kingdom, Bolko IV began to work closely with the new King Sigismund of Luxembourg, who promised a favorable arrangement on 18 September 1421 if the Duke of Opole fought at his side. As a result of this cooperation, two years later in the Congress of Bratislava (which occurred in order to stop the disputes between the King and the Teutonic Order), Bolko IV and his brother Bernard received the town of Sieradz and part of Greater Poland; however, this arrangement remained only on paper, because soon after in Kežmarok the peace between the Polish and Bohemian Kings was concluded.

By 1424 Bolko IV and Bernard inherited the town of Głogówek after the death of Euphemia, widow of Władysław Opolczyk, who received this land as her dower; however, at the end of that year they granted the town of Bolko V the Hussite, Bolko IV's eldest son.

After the end of the 1420s Silesia was shaken by the Hussite Wars. Bolko IV initially stood at the side of King Sigismund, despite the danger of punitive expeditions of the Hussite troops; but in 1428 he and his brother Bernard decided to make peace with the Hussites, but without the guarantee of security over their domains. However, soon Bolko IV returned to the Bohemian side and on 16 September 1435 the Hussites were finally repelled from Silesia.

Bolko IV died on 6 May 1437 and was buried in the Ducal vault in the Franciscan church in Opole.

== Marriage and issue ==
By 1398 Bolko IV married Margareta (ca. 1375? – 6 December 1437), probably a member of the House of Görz. They had five children:

1. Bolko V the Hussite (ca. 1400 – 29 May 1460).
2. Jan I (1410/13 – 5 September 1439).
3. Margareta (1412/14 – 15 January 1454), married by 1423 to Duke Louis III of Oława.
4. Henry (1420 – 8 April 1436).
5. Nicholas I (ca. 1424 – 3 July 1476).

Bolko IV of Opole House of Piast Born: between 1363 and 1367 Died: 6 May 1437
Regnal titles
| Preceded by Bolko III | Duke of Strzelce; 1382–1400 with Henry II (1382-1394); Bernard | Succeeded by Bernard |
| Preceded by Henry | Duke of Niemodlin; 1382–1400 with Henry II (1382-1394); Bernard | Succeeded by Bernard |
| Preceded by Władysław | Duke of Opole; 1396–1437 with Bernard (1396-1400) | Succeeded by Jan I Nicholas I |
