= Louis II of Brieg =

Louis II
- Duke of Brzeg, Legnica
- Coat-of-arms of Silesian Piasts
- Born: 1380/85
- Died: 30 May 1436
- Noble family: Silesian Piasts
- Spouses: Hedwig Zápolya; Elisabeth of Brandenburg
- Issue: Magdalena; Hedwig
- Father: Henry VII of Brzeg
- Mother: Margaret of Masovia

Louis II of Brieg; (1380/85 – 30 May 1436), was a Duke of Brzeg (Brieg) from 1399 (until 1400 with his older brother as a co-ruler) and Duke of Legnica from 1413.

He was the second son of Henry VII with a Scar, Duke of Brzeg, but the eldest born by his second wife Margaret, daughter of Siemowit III, Duke of Masovia.

== Life ==
Little is known about Louis II's first years. The death of his father in 1399 left him and his older half-brother Henry IX as the co-rulers of the Duchy of Brieg; however, one year later (October 1400) they decided to make a formal division of their domains: Louis II retained Brieg and Henry IX took Lubin (Lüben), Chojnów (Haynau) and Oława (Ohlau). On 17 July 1402 both brothers appeared in a meeting of Piast Dukes in Wrocław, in which they concluded with each other and the other Dukes a defensive alliance and paid homage to King Wenceslaus IV.

In 1404 Louis II made a pilgrimage to the Holy Land, during which he was imprisoned by the Saracens. The unfortunate news reached Brzeg only at the end of the year. Henry IX, in order to gather the ransom for his brother, imposed on the inhabitants of Brzeg, as well on his own subjects of Chojnów and Oława an additional tax. The needed sum of 4,000 fines was collected shortly after; however, Louis II wasn't returned to Silesia until the end of 1405. During his captivity, his brother held the regency over his Duchy of Brieg.

Relations between the brothers (which since their childhood had always been close and warm) suffered a total breakdown in connection with the issue of the succession over the Duchy of Legnica. In March 1409 Duke Wenceslaus II of Legnica, Bishop of Wrocław, decided to name Louis II as his heir, left him Legnica and a half of Złotoryja (Goldberg). The rights over the other half of Złotoryja and a rent of 6,000 fines were assigned to Henryk IX. Wenceslaus II also decided that both brothers had the option to take control over all Złotoryja if one paid the other in compensation. In the same year Louis II purchased from Henry IX his part of Złotoryja. At this point, the Duke of Lubin (already infuriated by the favoritism of Wenceslaus II over Louis II) and his younger brother broke their friendly relations. Soon the dispute turned into an open war, begun by Henry IX, which occurred during the years 1411–1414. Eventually, on 16 March 1413 Wenceslaus II resigned from the government of Legnica, and gave it to Louis II.

The war continued despite the mediation of Wenceslaus II, who tried to persuade Henry IX to stop. The dispute only ended thanks to the action of King Wenceslaus IV, who forbade his vassals from fighting. The brothers were finally reconciled and issued a document on mutual help. The residents of the Duchy of Legnica-Złotoryja were obliged to pay homage to both Dukes.

In 1419 Ludwik II obtained the town of Krnov for life, and in 1427 Strzelin. In 1413 he had already pledged the towns of Kluczbork, Wołczyn and Byczyna to Conrad VII the White, Duke of Oleśnica, who finally bought them in 1420. In 1434 Conrad VII also pledged these lands, this time to the Dukes of Opole.

== Marriages and Issue ==
Before 14 August 1409, Ludwik II married firstly Hedwig Zápolya (d. 1414), daughter of a Hungarian baron. They had no children.

In Konstanz on 9 April 1418, Ludwik II married secondly Elisabeth (b. 1 May/29 September 1403 – d. Legnica, 31 October 1449), daughter of Frederick I, Elector of Brandenburg. They had four children:

1. Louis (b. 1419/20 – d. bef. 7 January 1435)
2. Elisabeth (b. 5 January 1426 – d. bef. 7 January 1435)
3. Magdalena (b. c. 1430 – d. 10 September 1497), married by February 1442 to Duke Nicholas I of Opole.
4. Hedwig (b. c. 1433 – d. 21 October 1471), married in February 1445 to Duke Jan I of Lubin.

The death of his only son left Louis II without heirs. On his death, one year later, he left the duchies of Legnica and Brieg to his wife as dower. Eventually, both duchies were obtained by his grandson Frederick I of Legnica – Hedwig's son – in 1481.

Preceded by Henry VII	Duke of Brzeg; 1399–1436 with Henry IX (1399–1400)	Succeeded by Elisabeth
Preceded by Wenceslaus II	Duke of Legnica; 1413–1436	Succeeded by Elisabeth
