= Byczyna =

Town in Opole Voivodeship, Poland

- Flag Coat of arms

- Location within Poland
- Coordinates: 51°7′N 18°13′E
- Country: Poland
- Voivodeship: Opole
- County: Kluczbork
- Gmina: Byczyna
- First mentioned: 1054
- Town rights: before 1268

Government
  - Mayor: Iwona Sobania

Area
  - Total: 5.79 km^{2} (2.24 sq mi)
- Elevation: 197 m (646 ft)

Population (31 December 2021)
  - Total: 3,582
  - Density: 619/km^{2} (1,600/sq mi)
- Time zone: UTC+1 (CET)
  - Summer (DST): UTC+2 (CEST)
- Postal code: 46-220
- Area code: +48 77
- Car plates: OKL
- Website: http://www.byczyna.pl

Byczyna [bɨˈt͡ʂɨna] (Note: Latin: Bicina, Bicinium; German: Pitschen) is a town in Kluczbork County, Opole Voivodeship, in southern Poland, with 3,490 inhabitants as of December 2021.

Founded in the Middle Ages, Byczyna features a preserved medieval urban layout with defensive walls, towers and gates, and Gothic and Baroque churches. It was a notable regional center of education and one of the leading centers of Polish Reformation in the early modern period, and is particularly known for the Battle of Byczyna of 1588 between Poland and Austria.

== Etymology ==
The name comes from the Old Polish word byczyna, which means a place for breeding and grazing bulls.

== History ==
The town of Byczyna was first mention in 1054 when it temporarily served as the capital of the Bishopric of Wrocław. It was part of Poland and during its fragmentation period it was part of the duchies of Silesia, Głogów and Namysłów, before it was again under direct rule of Polish King Casimir III the Great from 1341 to 1348. It was granted town rights before 1268. In 1356 it passed to the Czech Crown Lands, and it soon returned under the rule of local Polish dukes of the Piast dynasty, as part of the duchies of Świdnica, Opole, Brzeg, Oleśnica, again Brzeg, Opole and finally Legnica until 1675. Afterwards it was incorporated into the Habsburg-ruled Czech Kingdom. It was a border town, located near Poland.

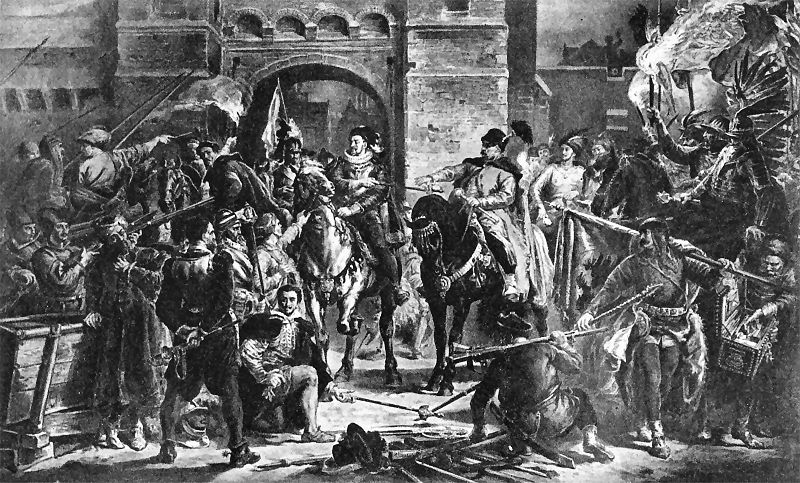
Jan Zamoyski at the Battle of Byczyna in 1588, painting by Jan Matejko

The Battle of Byczyna took place nearby between Maximilian III, Archduke of Austria, who was elected as king of Poland, and Sigismund III Vasa who also was elected as king, on January 24, 1588. Maximilian was defeated. He surrendered and went to imprisonment. The German author Gustav Freytag reports in his memories about yearly border violations at Byczyna.

In the 16th century, a Polish school was established, which flourished in the 17th century, and from 1657 to 1661 its rector was Byczyna-born Polish scholar and translator John Herbinius. The school was particularly popular among the burghers of Wrocław, and at the height of its popularity in the mid-17th century, it attracted students from across Silesia, Poland, Meissen, and Wittenberg. The school's professors also were publishers of Polish textbooks. Byczyna was one of the main centers of Polish Protestantism in the 16th and 17th centuries, as well as one of the main centers of Polish literary life in Silesia after the Thirty Years' War. During the Thirty Years' War the town was occupied by the Saxons in 1633 and Swedes in 1646.

After the Prussian annexation in 1742, Byczyna, under the Germanized name Pitschen, entered a period of Germanisation, and the local school slowly diminished. In 1757 the town suffered the largest fire in its history. Despite those circumstances, in the 19th century, the town was still largely inhabited by Poles. After World War I and the rebirth of independent Poland, Germany introduced a number of restrictions, including a state of emergency, to hinder the self-organization of local Poles. In the interwar period the town remained part of Germany and has been affected by a recession. Smuggling became widespread, which ended only during the concentration of German troops before the invasion of Poland and start of World War II in 1939. In 1945, the population was mostly evacuated before the advancing Eastern Front, with only a few hundred people remaining, mostly local Poles and Polish forced laborers, of which over 200 were massacred by Soviet troops, after their capture of the town on 18 January 1945. After the defeat of Nazi Germany in 1945, Byczyna was reintegrated with Poland. Soon the Polish railway and post were organized as the first post-war Polish institutions in the town.

== Notable people ==
- Piotr of Byczyna, medieval Polish writer, author or co-author of the 14th-century Polish chronicle Chronica principum Poloniae
- Eliasz Kreczmar (von Löven), physician and astronomer, married Maria Cunitz
- Maria Cunitz (1610–1664), astronomer, died at Pitschem
- Jan Herbinius (1627–1679), Polish scholar and translator
- Adam Quasius (1673–1736), theologian and Deacon at St. Elisabeth Church in Wrocław
- Piotr Steinkeller (1799–1854), industrialist, "Polish King of Zinc", exploited local ore deposits
- Jan Dzierżon (1811–1906), pioneering Polish apiarist, attended school in Byczyna
- Martin Kutta (1867–1944), mathematician

== Twin towns – sister cities ==
See twin towns of Gmina Byczyna.

== Gallery ==
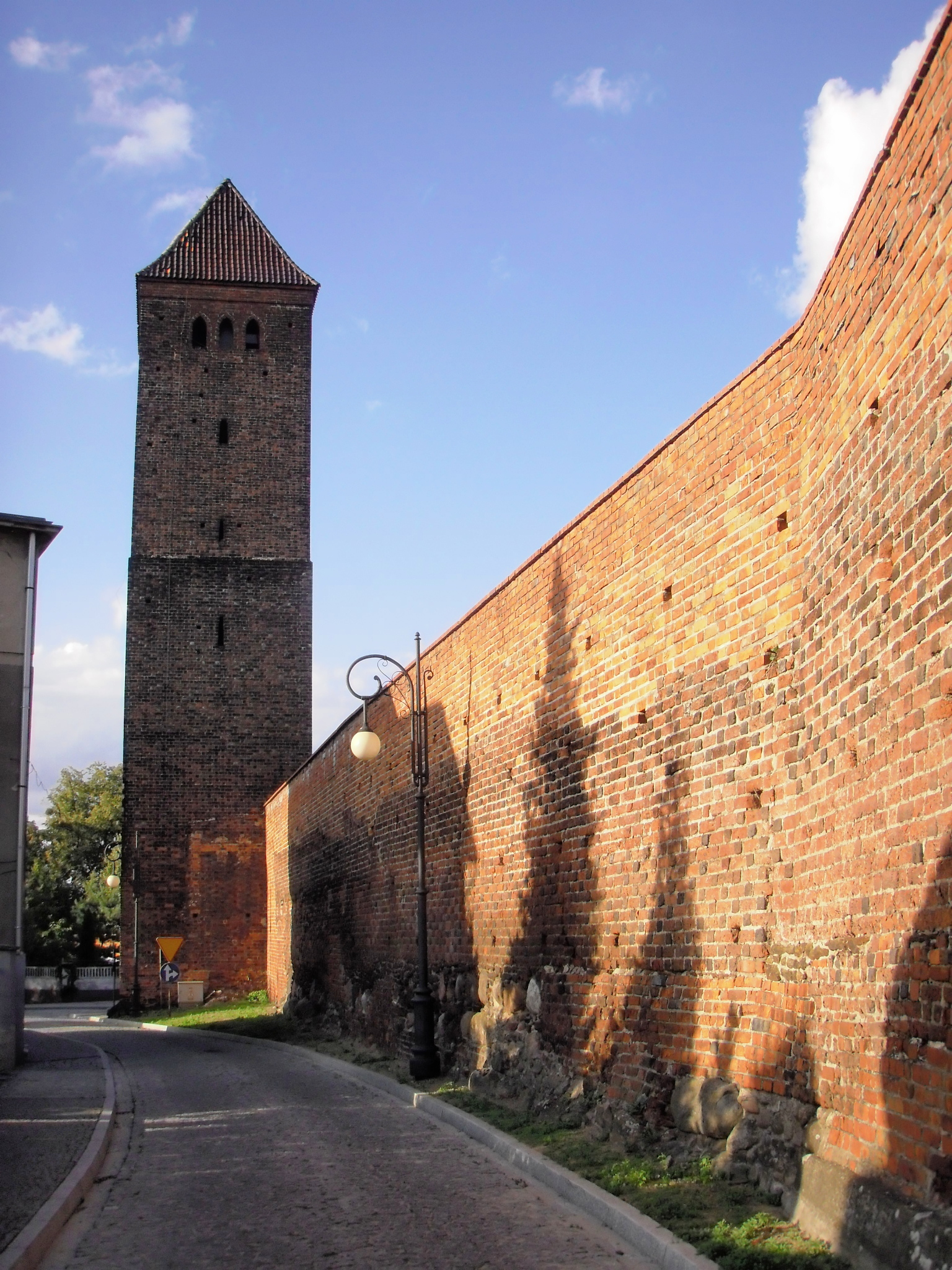
Medieval town walls with the Eastern (or "Polish") Tower

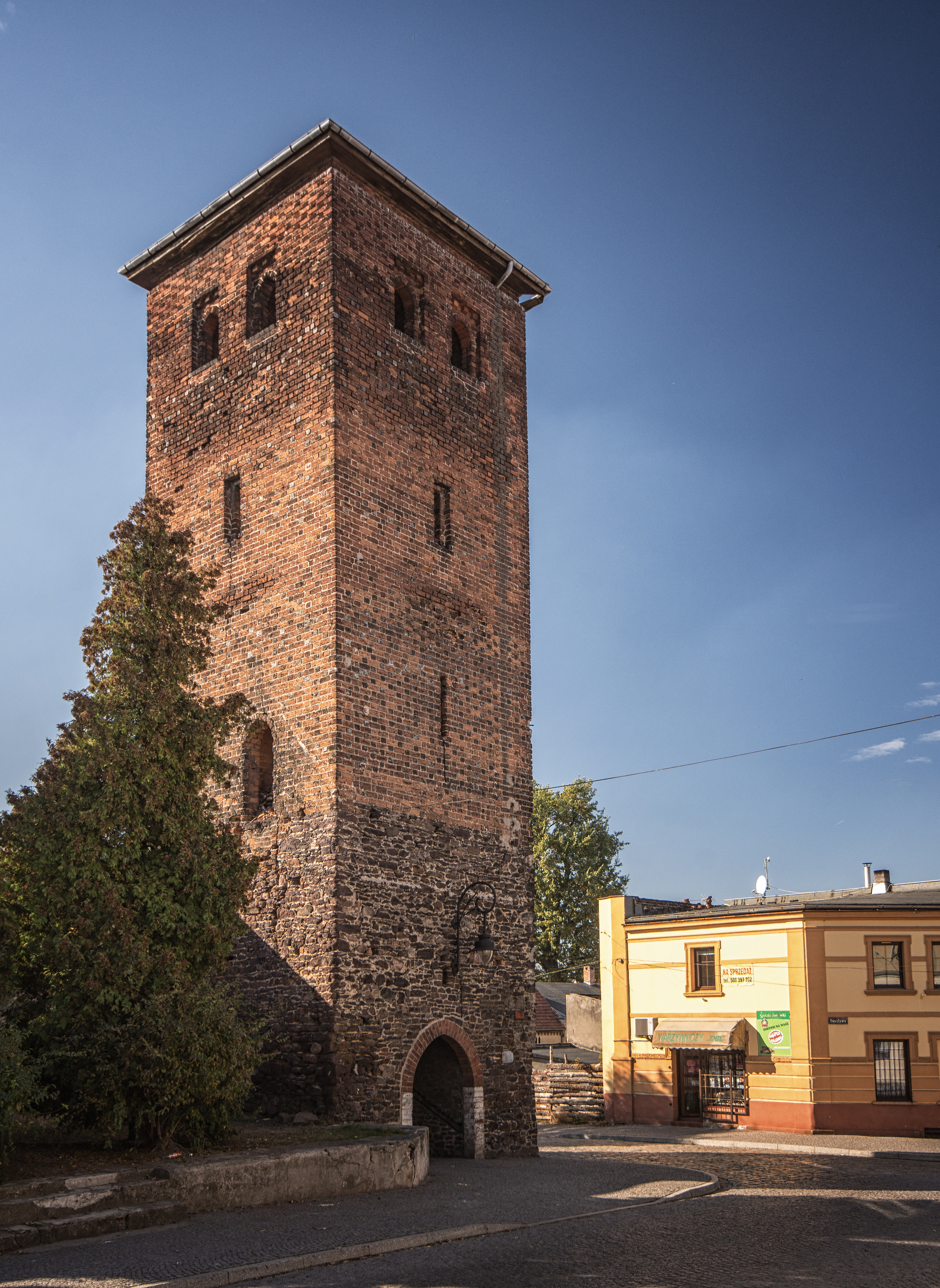
Western (or "German") Tower

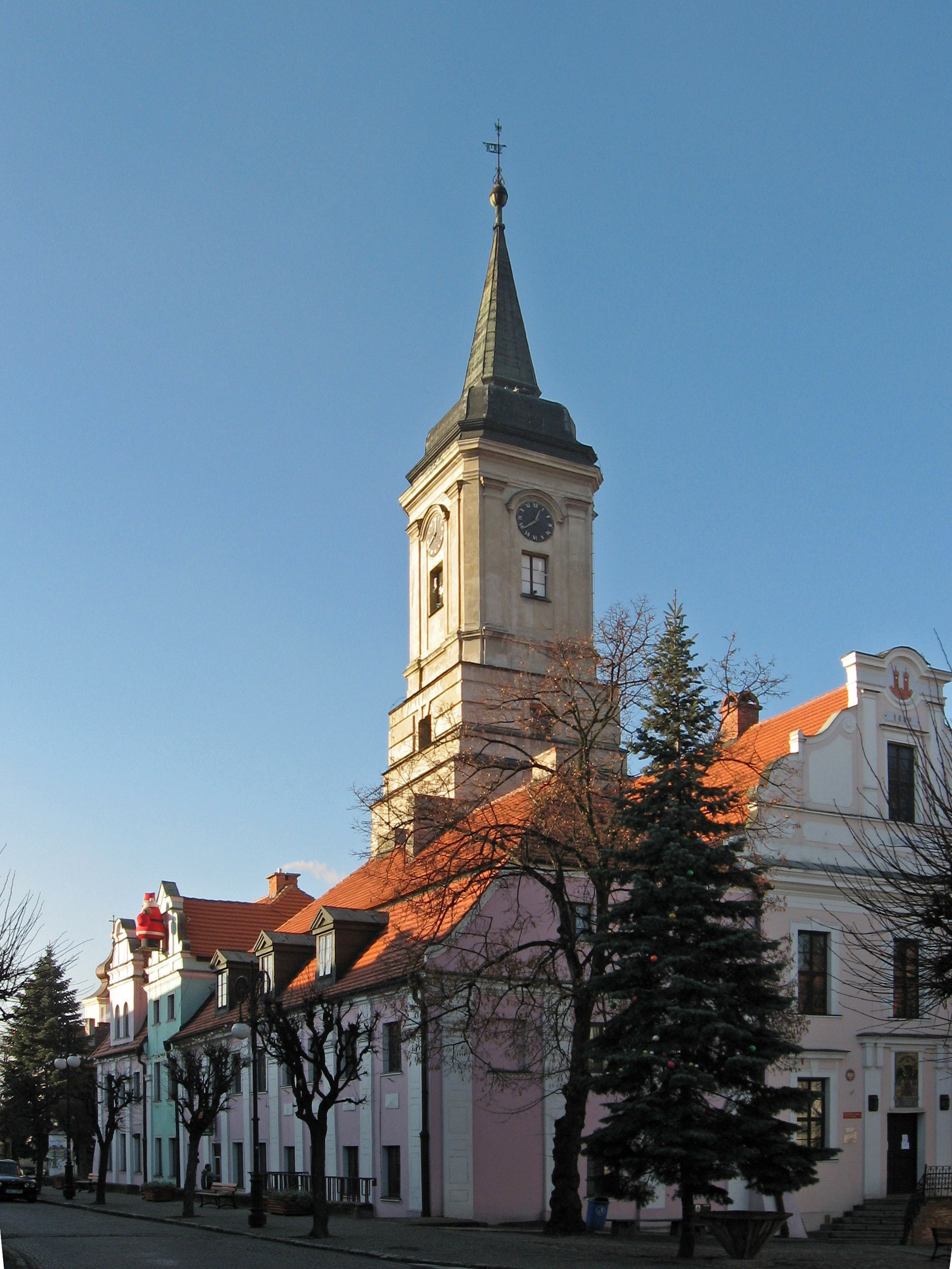
Byczyna Town Hall

Baroque Holy Trinity church

The St. Nicholas Church
