= Olesno =

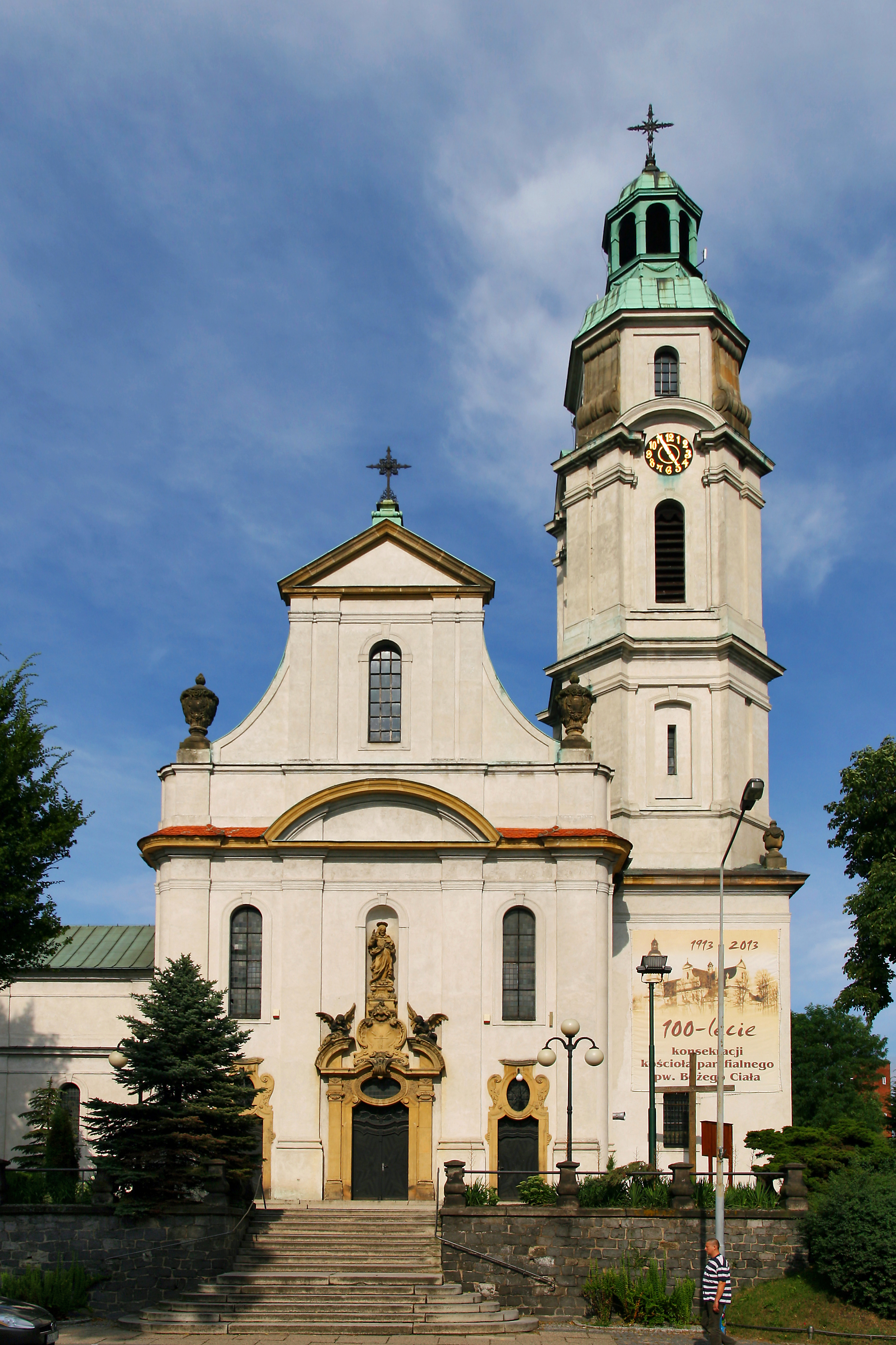
- Corpus Christi church

- Flag Coat of arms

- Location within Poland
- Coordinates: 50°52′30″N 18°25′0″E
- Country: Poland
- Voivodeship: Opole
- County: Olesno
- Gmina: Olesno
- First mentioned: 1226
- Town rights: 1275

Government
  - Mayor: Piotr Grenda

Area
  - Total: 15.1 km^{2} (5.8 sq mi)
- Elevation: 240 m (790 ft)

Population (2019-06-30)
  - Total: 9,374
  - Density: 621/km^{2} (1,610/sq mi)
- Time zone: UTC+1 (CET)
  - Summer (DST): UTC+2 (CEST)
- Postal code: 46-300
- Car plates: OOL
- Website: http://www.olesno.pl/

Olesno (Note: Polish pronunciation: [ɔˈlɛsnɔ]; Steuer's Silesian alphabet: Růżano Gůra, Uoleszno; Silesian ślabikŏrzowy szrajbōnek: Rōżanŏ Gōra, Òleszno; German: Rosenberg [ˈʁoːzn̩bɛʁk]; Silesian German: Rusabarg, Rusnbarg) is a town in Opole Voivodship, in southern Poland, about 42 km (26 mi) north-east of the city of Opole. It is the capital of Olesno County and seat of the Gmina Olesno.

== History ==
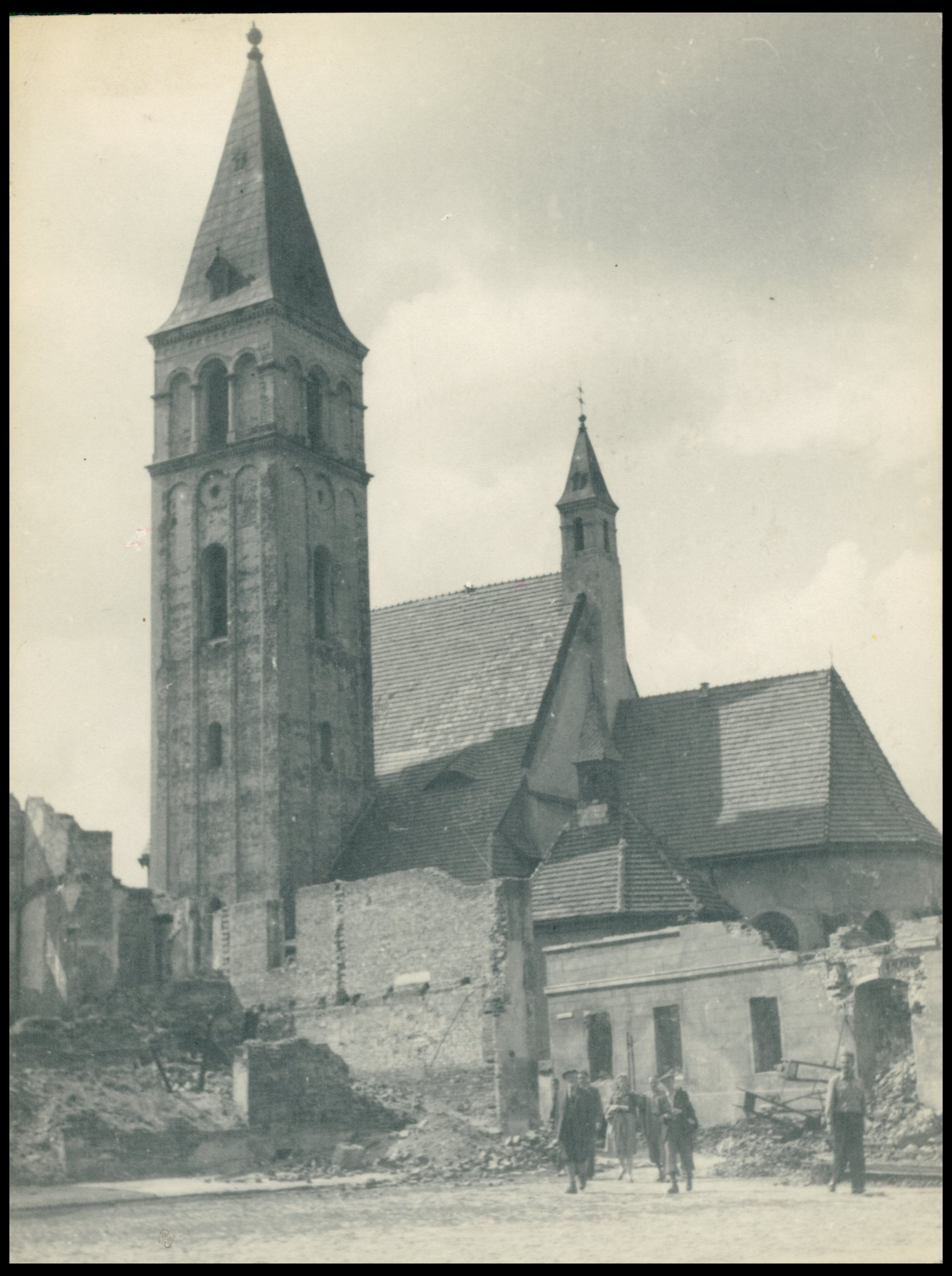
Church of Saint Michael Archangel in 1949

The area near the ancient Amber Road had been settled since the Neolithic era. Olesno was first mentioned in a 1226 deed by Bishop Wawrzyniec of Wrocław though it may refer to the neighbouring village of Stare Olesno (Old Olesno). It was part of the duchies of Opole, Silesia and again Opole of fragmented Piast-ruled Poland. In 1229 it was acquired by Duke Henry I the Bearded of Wrocław. Olesno became seat of a castellan and received town rights in 1275 from Duke Władysław Opolski. A mint was also located in the town. It then was a part of the Duchy of Opole which became a fiefdom of the Kingdom of Bohemia in 1327 and was incorporated into the Holy Roman Empire by Charles IV in 1355, however, it remained under the rule of local Polish dukes within the Duchy of Opole until its dissolution in 1532. The town suffered during the Thirty Years' War, and in 1645 it returned to Poland under the House of Vasa until 1666, when it fell again to Bohemia.

In 1708 it was hit by a plague epidemic. After the First Silesian War and the Treaty of Breslau (Wrocław) in 1742 Olesno was annexed by the Kingdom of Prussia, and in 1815 became part of the Province of Silesia. During the Napoleonic Wars, in 1806, the town was captured by French troops. Despite Germanisation policies, in the 19th century the town was a significant Polish center in Upper Silesia, and from 1848 the first local Polish newspaper Telegraf Górnośląski was published. After World War I, in 1919 and 1921, the Silesian Uprisings were fought there, the aim of which was to reintegrate the town with Poland after it regained independence in 1918. In the Upper Silesia plebiscite of 20 March 1921 3,286 inhabitants voted to remain in Germany, 473 for Poland. Thus Rosenberg remained part of the Weimar Republic. The Volksbote f. d. Kreise Kreuzburg u. Rosenberg was published as a local newspaper in Rosenberg.

After the outbreak of World War II in 1939, the German authorities arrested local Polish activists. On 21 January 1945 it was taken by the Soviet troops of the 5th Guards Army. It became again part of Poland, although with a Soviet-installed communist regime, which remained in power until the Fall of Communism in the 1980s. The Polish anti-communist resistance was active in Olesno, including the Konspiracyjne Wojsko Polskie (Underground Polish Army) and Wulkan (Volcano) organizations.

The Olesno Regional Museum was founded in 1960.

== Transport ==
The S11 expressway bypasses Olesno to the north. The town has a station on the Poznań-Katowice railway line.

== Notable people ==
- Georg Burgfeld (1909–1957), highly decorated Hauptmann in the Wehrmacht
- Adam Deja (born 1993), footballer
- Hermann Friedberg (1817–1884), physician
- Jan Grzesik (born 1994), footballer
- Rudy Kennedy (1927–2008), rocket scientist
- Franciszek Kokot (1929-2021), nephrologist, endocrinologist
- Adam Ledwoń (1974–2008), football player
- Józef Lompa (1797–1863), Polish activist, poet and publisher
- Helmuth von Pannwitz (1898–1947), general
- David Rosin (1823–1894), theologian
- Reinhold Saltzwedel (1889–1917), U-boat commander
- Oliwia Woś (born 1999), footballer

== Twin towns – sister cities ==
See twin towns of Gmina Olesno.

== Gallery ==
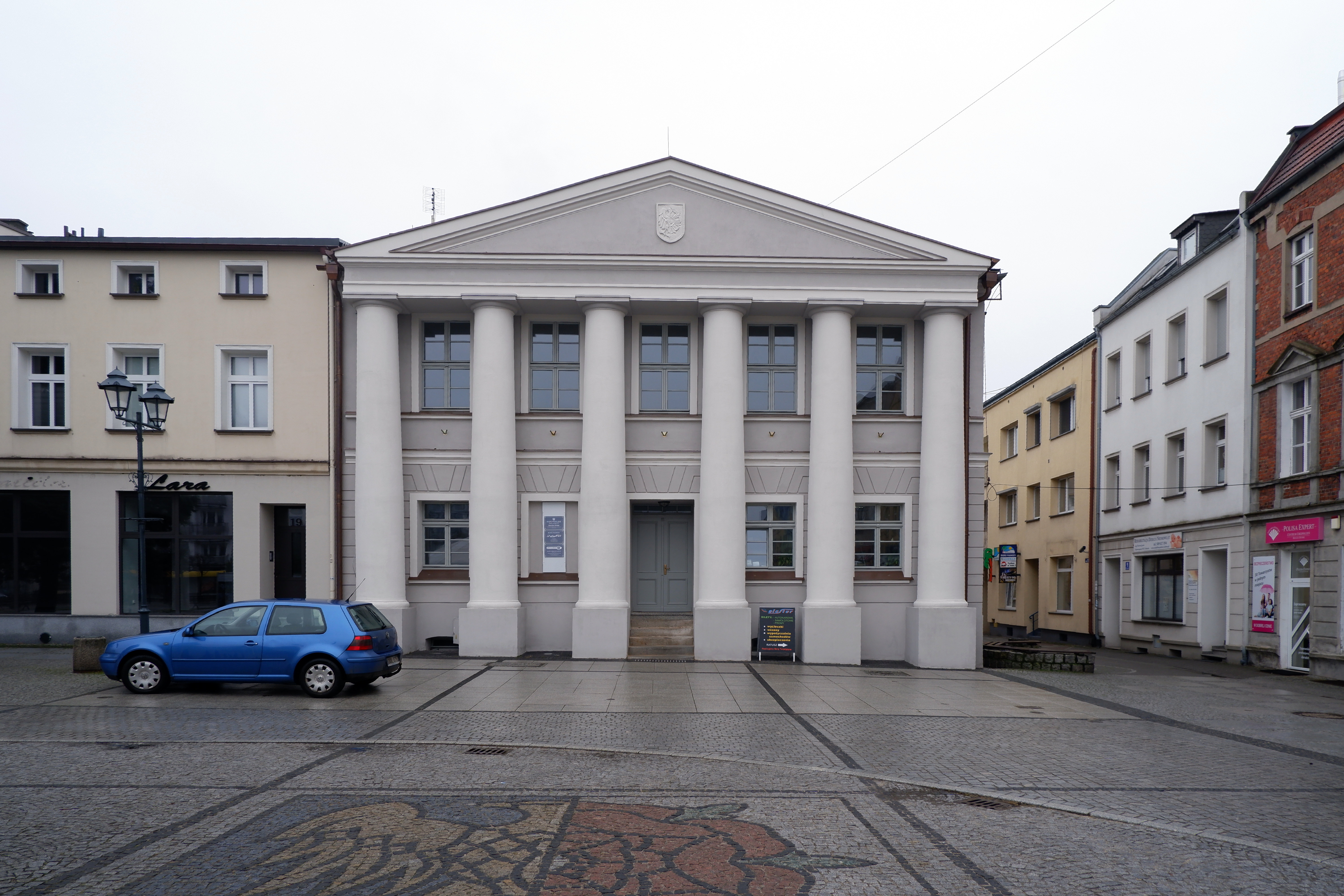
Town hall at the Market Square

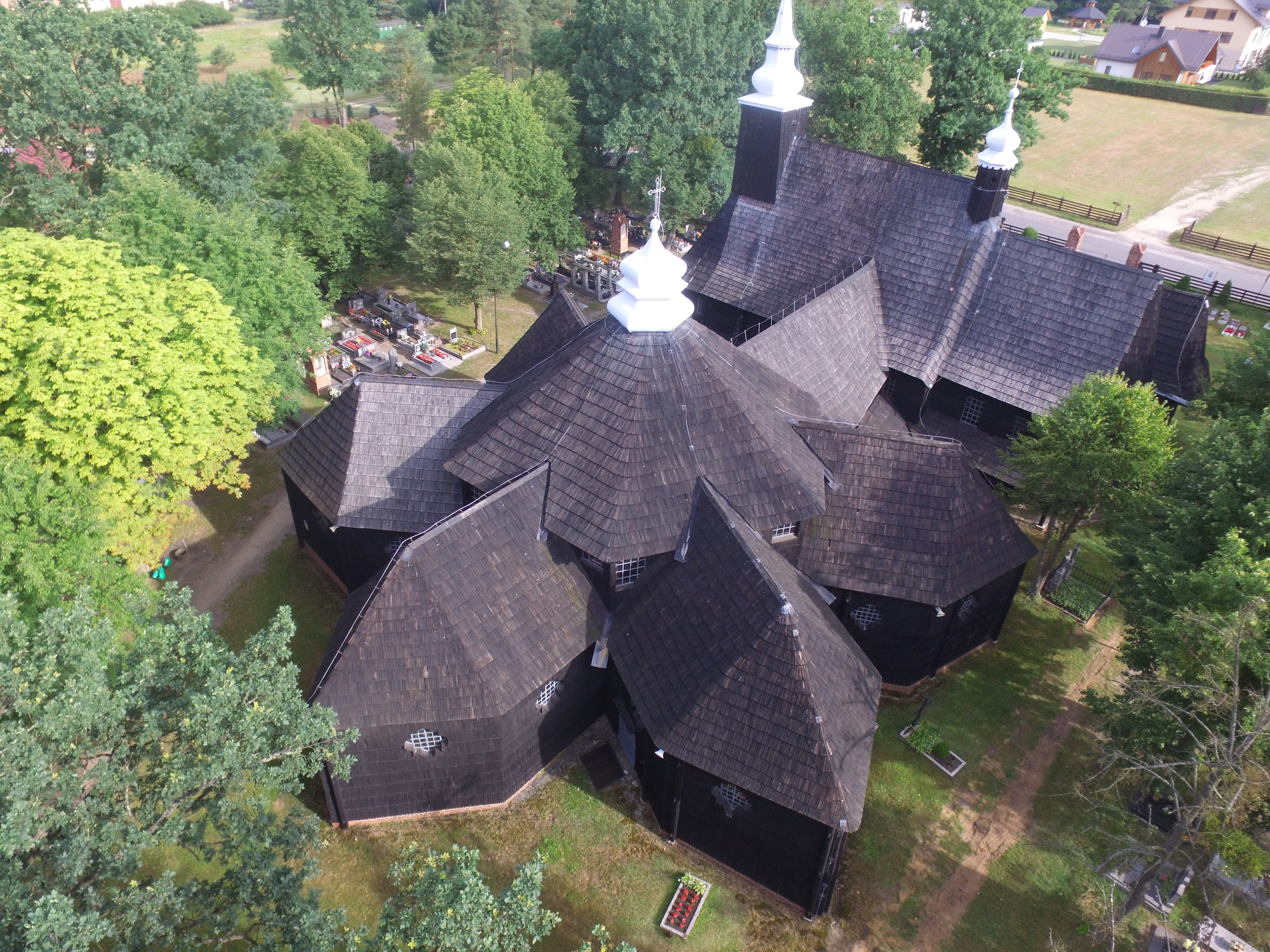
Wooden Saint Anne church, built in 1518, expanded in 1668-1670

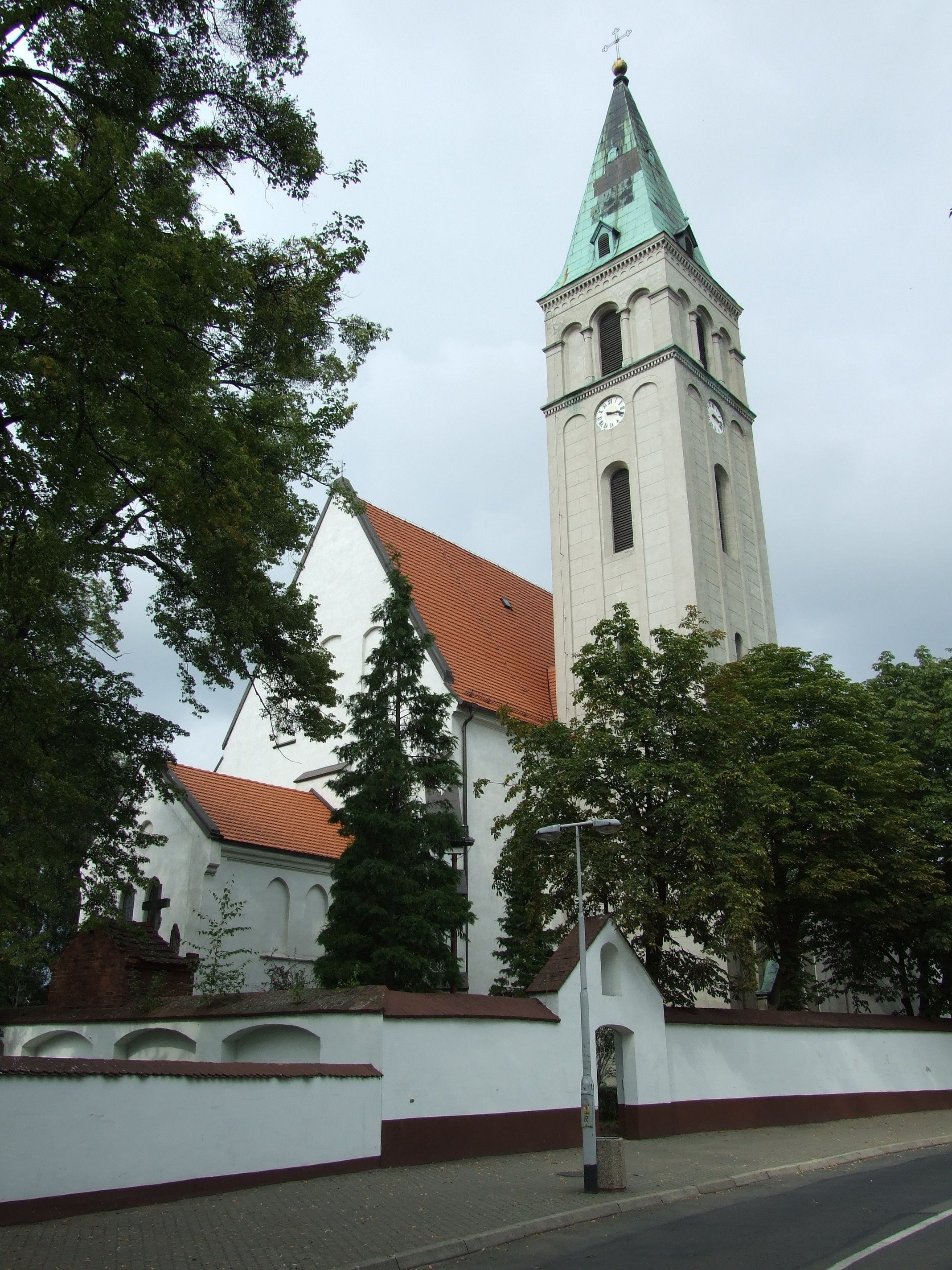
Gothic Church of Saint Michael Archangel

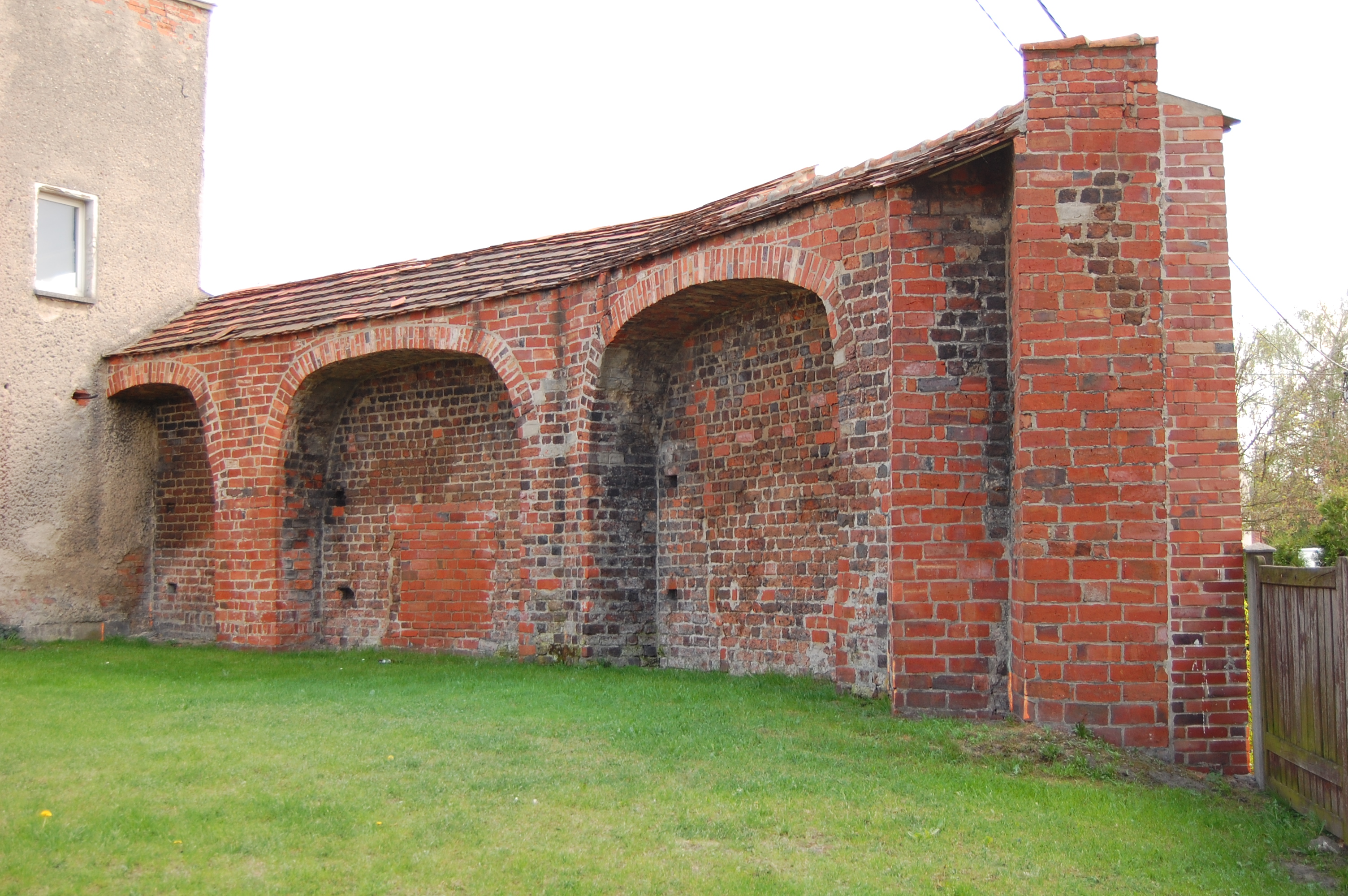
Preserved parts of the medieval town walls
