= Przemysław of Toszek =

Przemysław
- Duke of Oświęcim, Toszek
- Coat-of-arms of Upper Silesia (Toszek, Oświęcim, Zator, etc).
- Born: 1425
- Died: December 1484 (aged 58–59)
- Noble family: Silesian Piasts of Opole
- Spouse: Margareta/Machna of Opole
- Issue: Margareta of Toszek
- Father: Casimir I of Oświęcim
- Mother: Anna of Żagań

Przemysław of Toszek (Polish: Przemysław Toszecki) (1425 – December 1484) was a Duke of Oświęcim during 1434–1445 (with his brothers as co-rulers) and Duke of Toszek since 1445 until his death.

He was the second son of Duke Casimir I of Oświęcim by his first wife Anna, daughter of Duke Henry VIII of Żagań.

== Life ==
After the death of his father in 1434, Przemysław found himself under the care of his older brother Wenceslaus I. In 1441 Wenceslaus I succumbing to the pressures of the Polish King and undertook to convince his younger brothers, Przemysław and Jan IV to paid homage to the Polish Kingdom, once they reached adulthood.

The formal division of the Duchy was made on 19 January 1445. Przemysław received the least significant part of the Duchy, the town of Toszek. His first decision as an independent ruler was caught up in conflict with the Bishop of Kraków, Zbigniew Oleśnicki, who purchased Siewierz from the Dukes of Cieszyn. The agreement signed between both parties on 18 February 1447 in Kraków, was short-lived: on 6 October 1450 Przemysław attack with his troops the Bishop's castle in Siewierz.

In 1452 Przemysław supported his younger brother Jan IV in his fight against the Polish King Casimir IV. Soon the brother's troops were defeated and they were prompted to issue a document (7 March 1453), in which Przemysław took all the responsibility for the war, declared the freedom for all the prisoners, and paid 2,000 fines as a compensation. However, despite the truce concluded, however, Przemysław continue his attacks and forbidden the Polish merchants to enter in his domains. The definitive settlement between the Dukes and Poland took place in Gliwice soon after; under the terms of this treaty, Przemysław consent the sale of the Duchy of Oświęcim to Poland.

The now relative approximation of Przemysław with the Polish Kingdom resulted in his service in the war against the Teutonic Order, from where he returned in 1456. Despite the cooperation with the Poland, Przemysław stood at the side of his brother Jan IV in his border war against King Casimir IV. After some diplomatic negotiations, on 25 January 1458 at Bytom was made a new agreement between the brothers and Poland.

In 1471 Przemysław supported the candidacy of Władysław Jagiellon as King of Bohemia, and with this gained the hate of the other candidate for the throne, the Hungarian King Matthias Corvinus. It wasn't until 25 July 1479 when the Duke of Toszek received a guarantee of his government, but in exchange he was compelled to paid homage to Bohemia. The ceremony took place on 12 August of that year in Olomouc.

Przemysław died in December 1484 at his newly reconstructed castle in Toszek. He was buried in the local church of St. Peter.

== Marriage and issue ==
By 23 February 1463 Przemysław married with Margareta [also named Machna] (b. by 1450 – d. by 26 April 1472), daughter of Duke Nicholas I of Opole. They had one daughter:

1. Margareta (b. 1467/68 – d. 8 November 1531), Abbess of St. Klara, Wrocław.

After his death without male issue, the Duchy of Toszek was inherited by his brother Jan IV, but almost immediately the land was confiscated by King Matthias, who claimed more dubious rights to them.

== Ancestry ==
Ancestors of Przemysław of Toszek

16. Casimir I, Duke of Cieszyn
8. Przemyslaus I Noszak, Duke of Cieszyn
17. Euphemia of Czersk-Warsaw
4. Przemysław of Oświęcim
18. Bolesław of Bytom
9. Elisabeth of Koźle-Bytom
19. Margareta of Sternberg
2. Casimir I of Oświęcim
1. Przemysław of Toszek
24. Henry IV the Faithful
12. Henry V of Iron
25. Matilda of Brandenburg-Salzwedel
6. Henry VIII the Sparrow
26. Wenceslaus of Płock
13. Anna of Płock
27. Elisabeth of Lithuania
3. Anna of Żagań
28. Bolko II of Opole
14. Vladislaus II of Opole
29. Elisabeth of Świdnica
7. Katharina of Opole
30. András Lackfi, Voivode of Transylvania or Nicolae Alexandru Bassaraba, Voivode of Wallachia
15. Elisabeth

== Sources ==
- Genealogy of the Dukes of Cieszyn
- Genealogical database by Herbert Stoyan
- Marek, Miroslav. "Complete Genealogy of the House of Piast". Genealogy.EU.

Przemysław of Toszek House of Piast Born: 1425 Died: December 1484
Regnal titles
Preceded by Casimir I	Duke of Oświęcim with Wenceslaus I and Jan IV; 1434–1445	Succeeded by Jan IV
Preceded by new creation	Duke of Toszek; 1445–1484	Succeeded by Jan IV
