= Beatrice of Silesia =

Queen of Germany from 1314 to 1322

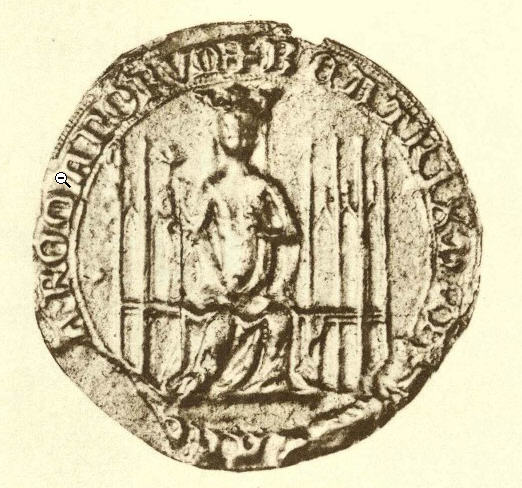

Queen consort of Germany
- Tenure: 1314–1322
- Born: VM 1290
- Died: 24 August 1322 (aged 31–32)
- Spouse: Louis IV, Holy Roman Emperor
- Issue: Matilda, Margravine of Meissen; Louis V, Duke of Bavaria; Stephen II, Duke of Bavaria
- House: Silesian Piast
- Father: Bolko I the Strict
- Mother: Beatrice of Brandenburg

Beatrice of Silesia (also known as Beatrice of Świdnica; Polish: Beatrycze świdnicka, German: Beatrix von Schweidnitz; 1290 – 24 August 1322) was a Polish princess member of the House of Piast in the Silesian branch of Jawor-Świdnica and by marriage Duchess of Bavaria and German Queen.

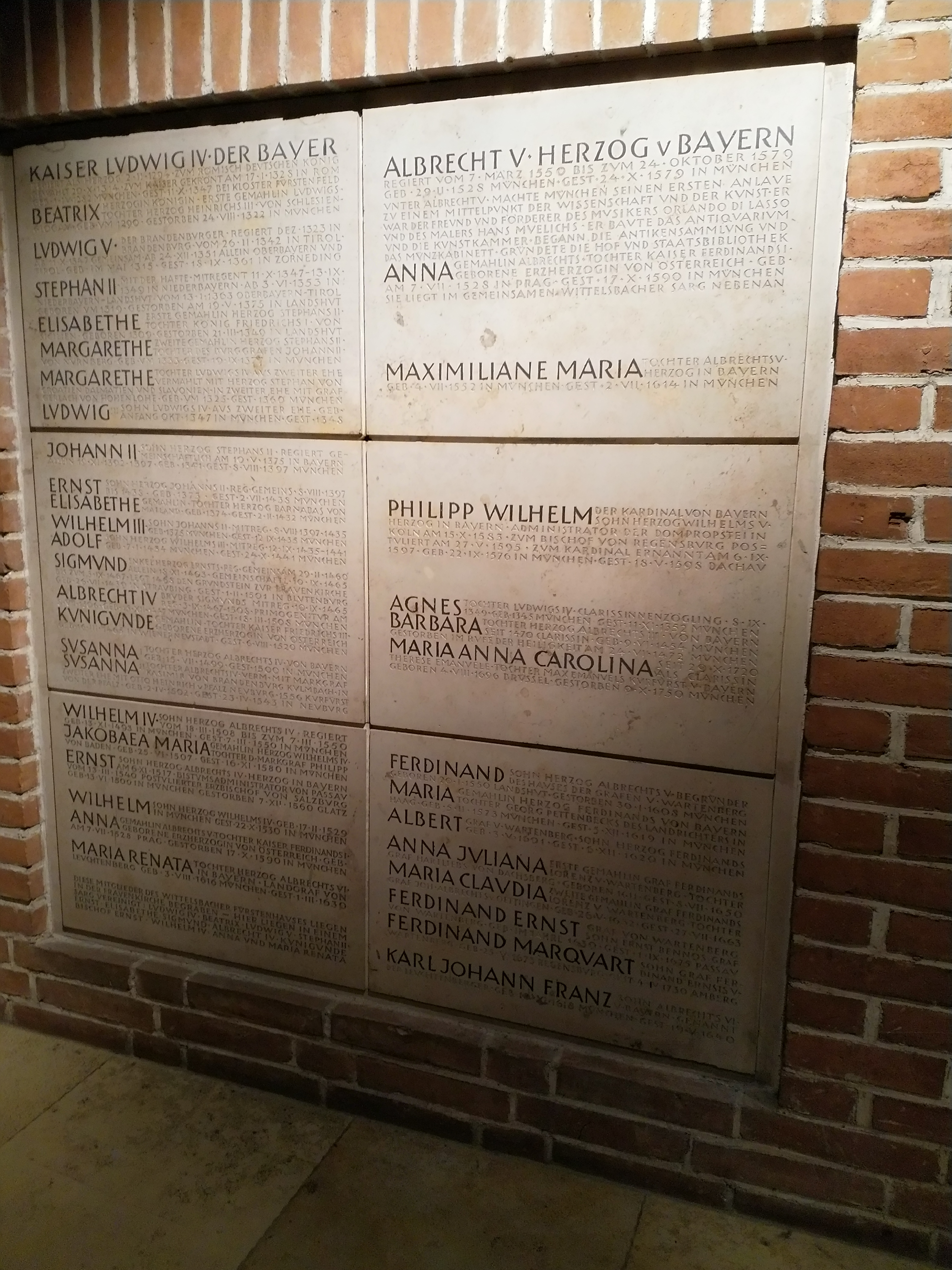

== Family ==
She was the second daughter of Bolko I the Strict, Duke of Jawor-Świdnica, by his wife Beatrice, daughter of Otto V, Margrave of Brandenburg-Salzwedel.

Beatrice was the third of ten children born to her mother and father. Her siblings included: Bernard of Świdnica, Henry I of Jawor, Bolko II of Ziębice and Judith, wife of Stephen I, Duke of Bavaria.

Seven years after the death of Beatrice's father and the birth of her posthumous sister, Anna, her mother Beatrice was remarried to Władysław of Bytom. From this marriage, Beatrice and her siblings gained two half-siblings: Casimir of Koźle and Euphemia, wife of Konrad I of Oleśnica.

== Life ==
After her father's early death in 1301, Beatrice and her siblings were placed under the tutelage of their maternal uncle Herman, Margrave of Brandenburg-Salzwedel until 1305, when the oldest son of Bolko I, Bernard, assumed the government of his domains and the guardianship of his younger siblings, including Beatrix.

It was this brother Bernard who, wanting to secure an alliance with Bavaria, arranged Beatrice's marriage to Louis IV, Duke of Upper Bavaria. The wedding took place by 14 October 1308. During her marriage, Beatrice gave birth to six children, but only three survived to adulthood: Matilda -by marriage Margravine of Meissen-, Louis V the Brandenburger -later Duke of Upper Bavaria, Margrave of Brandenburg and Count of Tyrol- and Stephen II – later Duke of Lower Bavaria.

Duke Louis IV was elected German King on 20 October 1314. However, another faction had elected Frederick I of Austria as King on 19 October. The two rival Kings would continue their dispute for the rest of her life. She was one of two rival German queens, with Isabella of Aragon, wife of Frederick I.

Beatrice died, at Munich, a long time before her husband's coronation as Holy Roman Emperor (in 1328). Two years after her death, Louis IV was remarried to Margaret II, Countess of Hainaut.

== Issue ==
Louis and Beatrix had six children; three of them lived to adulthood:

1. Mathilde (aft. 21 June 1313 – 2 July 1346, Meißen), married at Nuremberg 1 July 1329 Frederick II, Margrave of Meissen (d. 1349)
2. Daughter (end September 1314 – died shortly after).
3. Louis V the Brandenburger (July 1316 – 17/18 September 1361), duke of Upper Bavaria, margrave of Brandenburg, count of Tyrol
4. Anna (c. July 1317 – 29 January 1319, Kastl)
5. Agnes (c. 1318 – died shortly after).
6. Stephen II (autumn 1319 – 19 May 1375), duke of Lower Bavaria

== Notes and references ==
Royal titles
Preceded by Margaret of Brabant	German Queen; 20 October 1314 – 24 August 1322; With Isabella of Aragon (1315–1322)	Succeeded by Margaret II, Countess of Hainaut
