= Bolko II =

Bolko II may refer to:

- Bolko II of Ziębice (1300–1341)
- Bolko II of Opole (before 1300–1356)
- Bolko II the Small (c. 1312–1368)
