= Casimir I of Oświęcim =

Duke of Oświęcim

Casimir I
- Duke of Oświęcim, Toszek, Strzelin
- Coat-of-arms of Upper Silesia (Opole, Oświęcim, Toszek, Strzelin, etc).
- Born: 1396
- Died: 7 April 1434 (aged 37–38)
- Noble family: Silesian Piasts of Opole
- Spouses: Anna of Żagań; Margareta of Opava-Ratibor
- Issue: Wenceslaus I Przemysław; Jan IV of Oświęcim
- Father: Przemysław of Oświęcim
- Mother: unknown

Casimir I of Oświęcim (Polish: Kazimierz I Oświęcimski) (1396 – 7 April 1434) was a Duke of Oświęcim from 1406 (under regency until 1414) until his death in 1434, ruler over Toszek (from 1414 to 1434) and Strzelin (during 1416–1427).

He was the only child of Duke Przemysław of Oświęcim by his unknown wife.

== Life ==
After his father's death on 1 January 1406, Casimir I was placed under the care of his paternal grandfather, Duke Przemysław I Noszak of Cieszyn, and, after his death in 1410, his guardianship was taken by his uncle Bolesław I.

On 19 December 1414 Casimir I took formal possession of his Duchy of Oświęcim, along with the towns of Toszek and Gliwice. However, the ambitions of the young Duke erupted then and claimed more lands from his uncle. The conflict ended only two years later, on 11 November 1416 when (following the mediation of Duke Henry IX of Lubin), the Duke of Cieszyn give the town of Strzelin and 300 fines as payment to Casimir I. Bolesław I retained the rest of his lands.

In 1424 Casimir I took part in the coronation of Sophia of Halshany as Queen of Poland. However, this doesn't mean that the Duke of Oświęcim maintain a pro-Polish politics; in fact, he began at the same time his contacts to with the Bohemian King Sigismund of Luxembourg, and even spend some time in his court (there are information that Casimir I, for unknown reasons, received from the King a pension for 3,000 pieces of gold, perhaps as a payment for his mediation with the Teutonic Order, which, had good relations with the Duke of Oświęcim).

In 1428 Casimir I land's were plundered by the Hussites. During their incursions over Silesia, were burned the towns of Kęty, Toszek and Pyskowice. Another of town who belonged to the Duke of Oświęcim, Gliwice, become in a major Hussite base on Upper Silesia. The struggles with the hussites in the region lasted until 1433, when Casimir I was able to recover Gliwice (who was replaced as a Hussite base by the nearby Bytom) thanks to the unexpected help of Duke Nicholas V of Karniów (son of Jan II of Iron, who years before ordered the assassination of Casimir I's father).

Casimir I died in 1434 and was buried in the Dominican church in Oświęcim.

== Marriages and Issue ==
Before 28 May 1417 Casimir I married firstly with Anna (c. 1397–1426/33), daughter of Duke Henry VIII of Żagań. They had three sons:

1. Wenceslaus I (c. 1418 – before 29 July 1468).
2. Przemysław (1425 – December 1484).
3. Jan IV (1426/30 – by 21 February 1497).

By 1433, Casimir I married secondly with Margareta (1410 – 5 July 1459), daughter of Jan II of Iron, Duke of Racibórz. They had no children.

Casimir I of Oświęcim House of Piast Born: 1396 Died: 7 April 1434
Regnal titles
Preceded by Przemysław	Duke of Oświęcim; 1406–1434	Succeeded by Wenceslaus I Przemysław; Jan IV
