= Margareta of Sternberg =

Margareta of Sternberg (Czech: Markéta, Polish: Małgorzata; died aft. 5 June 1365) was a Moravian noblewoman and by marriage Duchess of Bytom.

She was the eldest child and only daughter of Jaroslav of Sternberg (Jaroslav ze Šternberka) by his second wife Margareta of Bílina (Machna z Bíliny). Margareta had two full-brothers, Aleš and Jan, and also two older half-brothers, Zdeněk (d. aft. 1408) and Smil (d. 1398), born from the first marriage of Jaroslav of Sternberg with a certain Eliška.

== Life ==
By 14 February 1347 Margareta married Duke Bolesław of Koźle. The marriage produced three daughters: Elisabeth —by marriage Duchess of Cieszyn—, Euphemia —by her first marriage Duchess of Niemodlin and by the second Duchess of Ziębice— and Bolka —later Abbess of Trzebnica—.

In 1352, Duke Bolesław inherited the Duchy of Bytom but died suddenly in Italy three years later (1355). In his will, he left Bytom to Margareta as her dower; however, the disputes soon began over the inheritance of the Duchy of Koźle-Bytom between the Dukes of Oleśnica and Cieszyn, who claimed rights by virtue of the treaty signed between Duke Władysław of Bytom and the Bohemian Kingdom, under which the succession of women over the Duchy in absence of male heirs was allowed. Koźle was taken by Duke Konrad I of Oleśnica (who claimed the rights of his wife Euphemia, eldest half-sister of Bolesław). At consequence of this conflict, Margareta's rights over Bytom were disputed and her rule was only formally.

After two years of conflicts, on 8 December 1357 a settlement was made: Bytom was divided between the Dukes Konrad I of Oleśnica and Casimir I of Cieszyn, legal guardian of Bolesław's daughters, who were forced to renounce their rights over the Duchy. Three years later, in 1360, the new Duke of Cieszyn, Przemysław I Noszak, married Elisabeth, the eldest daughter of Bolesław, and with this acquired additional rights over the half of Bytom. Margareta died five years later.

Regnal titles
Preceded by Bolesław	Duke of Bytom; 1355–1357	Succeeded by Konrad I and Casimir I
