= Toszek Castle =

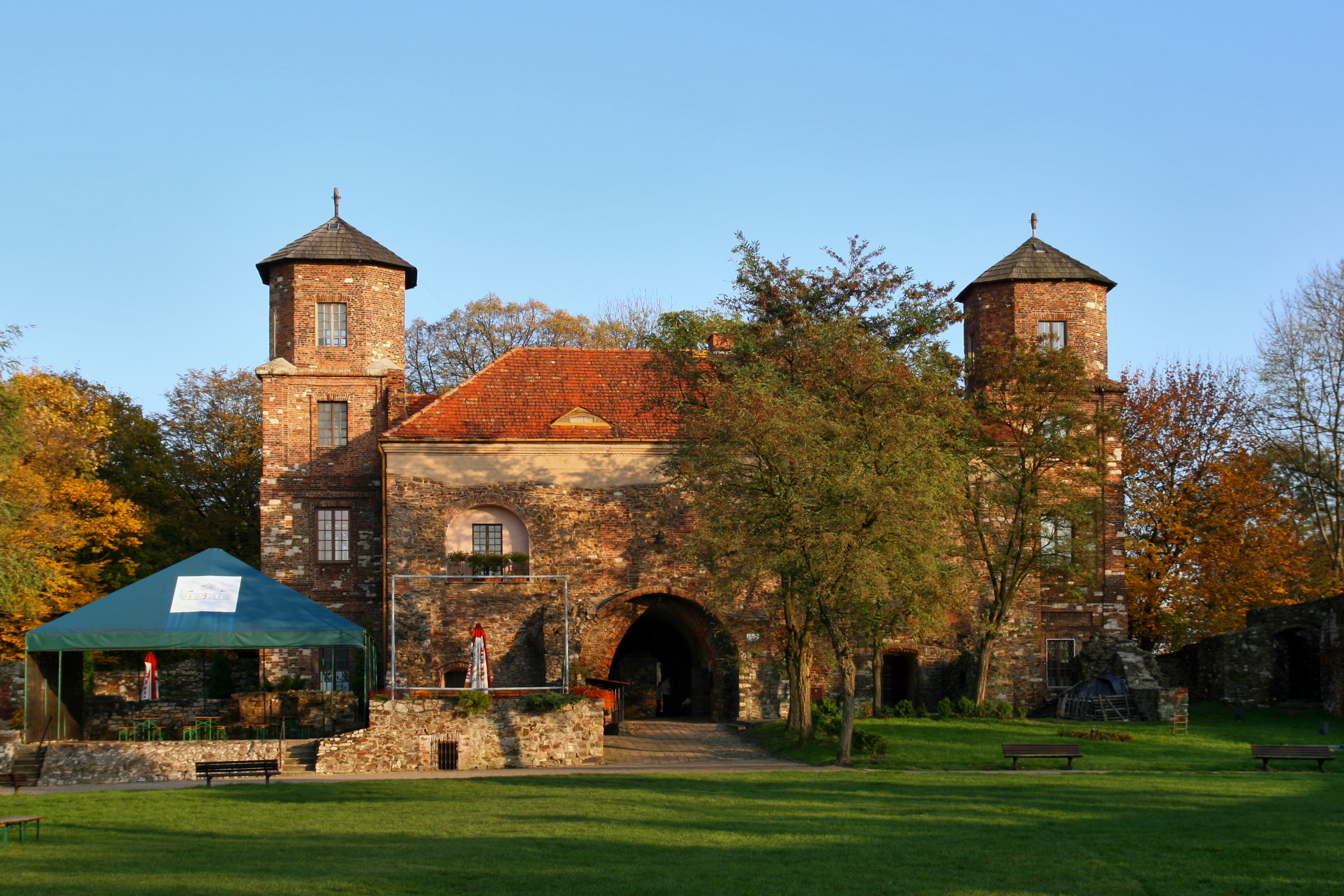
- Toszek Castle

- Location of Toszek Castle in Poland
- 50°27′22″N 18°30′52″E
- Location: Toszek, Silesian Voivodeship; Poland

History
- Built: 1222
- Demolished: 1811 (fire)
- Rebuilt: 1957-1963

Site notes
- Architectural style: Renaissance

Toszek Castle (German: Burg Tost) is a Renaissance styled castle, located in Toszek (23 km away from Gliwice, Silesian Voivodeship in Poland.

== History and the people ==
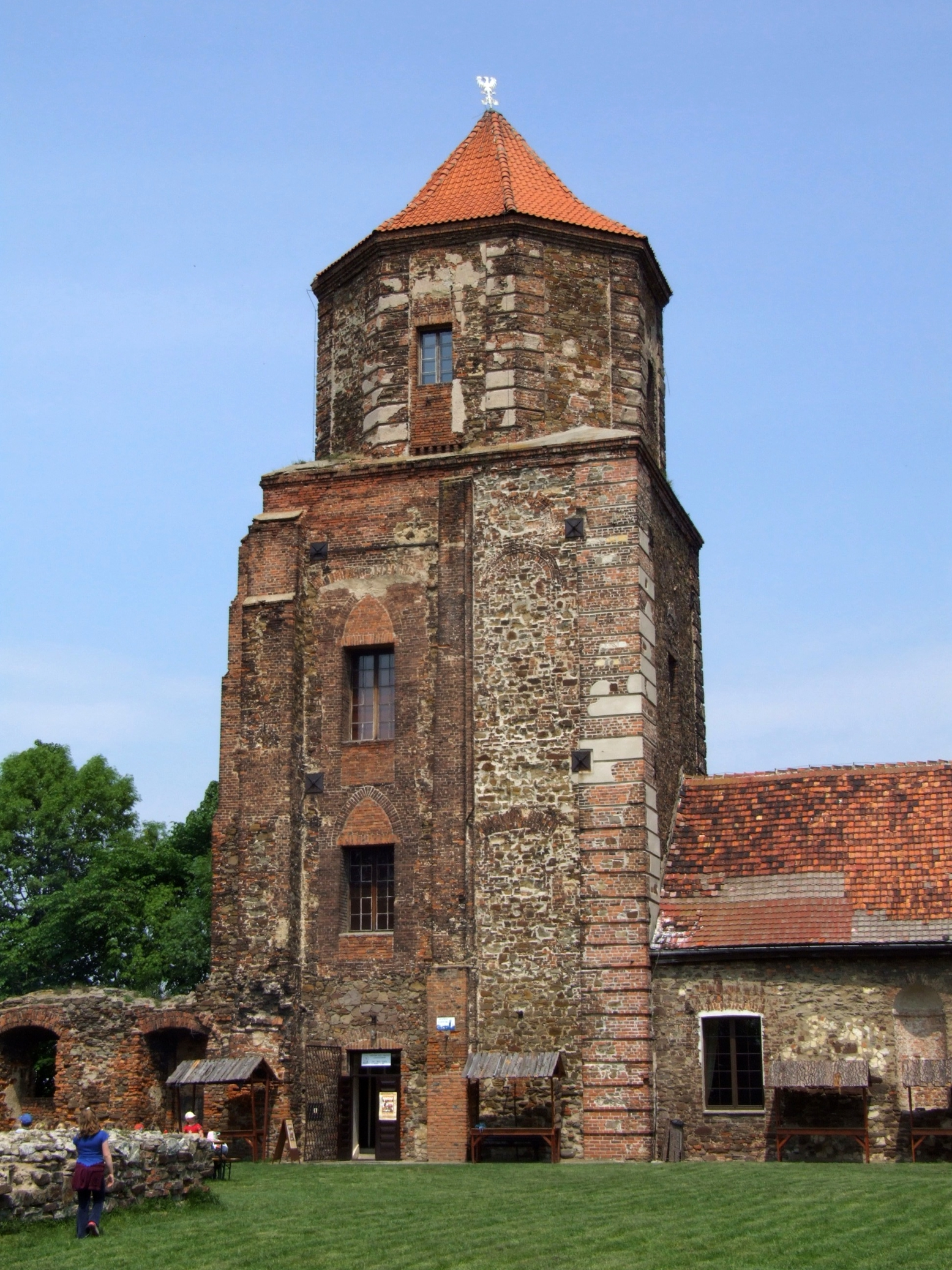
Castle tower

The history of the castle dates back to the tenth-eleventh century, when an early defensive castle was located on the castle's grounds. The castle was built two centuries later, in about the year 1222. When the Kingdom of Poland was under feudal fragmentation, the castle housed the following Silesian dukes and castellans. The most important part of the castle's being, was that under the rule of Duke Przemysław Toszecki, of the Oświęcim family line. After his death the castle became of property of the Dukes of Opole. In the sixteenth century, the castle was the property of the Habsburgs. Which gave the castle to do Redernów family, which they bought in 1592. In between 1638 and 1707 the castle was ruled by the Colonna family, which had made a full-scale reconstruction of the castle - by which the castle became a magnate residence, the first one in Upper Silesia. The following owners were: Johann Dietrich von Peterswald, Count Franciszek Karol Kotuliński, Posadowski family, and finally Adolf von Eichendorff.

In 1797, the castle was sold to Count Franciszek Adam Gaschinów. Shortly after, in 1811, the castle burned down and became a ruin. In 1840 the ruins were bought by Abraham Guradze, and the Guradze family maintained possession of the castle until World War II, when Abraham's great-grandson Count Kurt von Guradze bequeathed the castle to the youth of Poland. The castle was finally partially rebuilt in the 1950s and 1960s. Today, the castle houses a centre of culture, and a primary wedding celebration venue.
