= Władysław of Cieszyn (d. 1355) =

Polish prince

Władysław
- Judge court in Bohemia
- Coat-of-arms of Upper Silesia (Opole, Cieszyn, etc)
- Born: 1325/31
- Died: May 1355
- Noble family: Silesian Piasts of Opole
- Father: Casimir I, Duke of Cieszyn
- Mother: Euphemia of Masovia-Czersk

Władysław of Cieszyn (Polish: Władysław cieszyński) (1325/31 – May 1355) was a Polish prince member of the Piast dynasty in the Cieszyn branch.

He was the eldest son of Casimir I, Duke of Cieszyn, by his wife Euphemia, daughter of Duke Trojden I of Czersk-Warsaw.

== Life ==
Władysław certainly belonged to the race of princes who placed their church careers at the service of a powerful monarchy. In the case of the Dukes of Cieszyn (who, like mostly of Silesian rulers, are tied to them by homage) they saw their position in close cooperation with the House of Luxembourg, who ruled the Kingdom of Bohemia, which can be observed in the politics of both Duke Casimir I and his successor Przemysław I Noszak.

The excellent relations between Władysław and the later Emperor Charles IV (then King of Bohemia) provided a busy itinerary to him: from 1347 and until his death, the Polish prince was present in all the major events of the Bohemian court. No cause for amazement, therefore, that at the beginning of 1354 Władysław was appointed a Judge court by the King.

When on 10 November 1354 Charles IV called all his vassals to join him in trip to Rome in order to receive the Imperial crown, Władysław was one of immediately more closed to the future Emperor. His role as witness, moreover, is frequently described in documents issued of the House of Luxembourg. Of course, Władysław was present in first line in the imperial coronation on 5 April 1355 in Rome.

However, Władysław's promising career had a sudden and unexpected end. The prince is last mentioned in a document dated on 15 May 1355, and soon after he died in Pisa. The circumstances about the death of the Cieszyn prince were further narrated by the Italian chronicler Matteo Villenis: according to him, the Polish prince Stefan (obviously the name is erroneous, but from the context, it's clear that only could be Władysław) went with part of the Bohemian retinue to Florence, where Władysław was covered with high honors from the Emperor. After the banquet given in his honor, the prince fell heavily sick and soon after his return to Pisa he died. The death of his young favorite affected deeply to Charles IV, so that he decided to leave Italy immediately, especially from Pisa. This action caused the eruption of a violent anti-imperial riot, who was bloody clashed.

But this was a natural death or not?: Based on Matteo Villenis this fact is difficult to identify. Of course, the reasons for possible poisoning of Władysław were to warning the Emperor to leave Italy if he could escape from a similar fate, which in fact occurred.

There is another version of the death of prince of Cieszyn in Italy, by which he was killed during the anti-imperial riots in Pisa, saving Charles IV's life. However, this history is fanciful and rejected by the majority of historians.

For the above-mentioned reasons, it generally assumed that Władysław of Cieszyn, the Judge court of Emperor Charles IV, died in Pisa on May 1355 as a result of poisoning. A document dated from 27 September 1355 mentioned that Władysław was alive, but this certainly was a confusion with his younger brother Przemysław, who shortly after his death received his titles and dignities. Władysław's remains never returned to Cieszyn; he was buried in the cathedral of Pisa, where his good worked tombstone was still there in the 15th century.

== Ancestry ==
Ancestors of Władysław of Cieszyn (d. 1355)

16. Casimir I of Opole
8. Władysław Opolski
17. Viola
4. Mieszko I, Duke of Cieszyn
18. Władysław Odonic
9. Euphemia of Greater Poland
19. Jadwiga
2. Casimir I, Duke of Cieszyn
5. Grzymisława
1. Władysław of Cieszyn
24. Siemowit I of Masovia
12. Bolesław II of Masovia
25. Pereyaslava of Galicia
6. Trojden I, Duke of Masovia
26. Traidenis, Grand Duke of Lithuania
13. Gaudemunda of Lithuania
3. Euphemia of Czersk-Warsaw
28. Lev I of Galicia
14. Yuri I of Galicia
29. Constance of Hungary
7. Maria of Galicia
30. Casimir I of Kuyavia
15. Euphemia of Kuyavia
31. Euphrosyne of Opole
