= Władysław of Bytom =

Władysław
- Duke of Koźle, Bytom, Toszek, Siewierz
- Born: 1277/83
- Died: around 8 September 1352
- Noble family: Silesian Piasts of Bytom
- Spouses: Beatrice of Brandenburg; Ludgarda of Mecklenburg
- Issue: Casimir of Koźle; Euphemia; Agnes; Katharina; Bolesław of Bytom; Beatrix
- Father: Casimir of Bytom
- Mother: Helena (of Galicia?)

Władysław of Bytom (1277/83 – around 8 September 1352), was a Duke of Koźle during 1303-1334, Duke of Bytom from 1316, Duke of Toszek from 1329 and Duke of Siewierz during 1328–1337.

He was the second son of Duke Casimir of Bytom by his wife Helena.

== Life ==
Władysław's first official appearance was in 1289 on occasion of the homage of his father to King Wenceslaus II of Bohemia. In 1303 Władysław received from his father the town of Koźle.

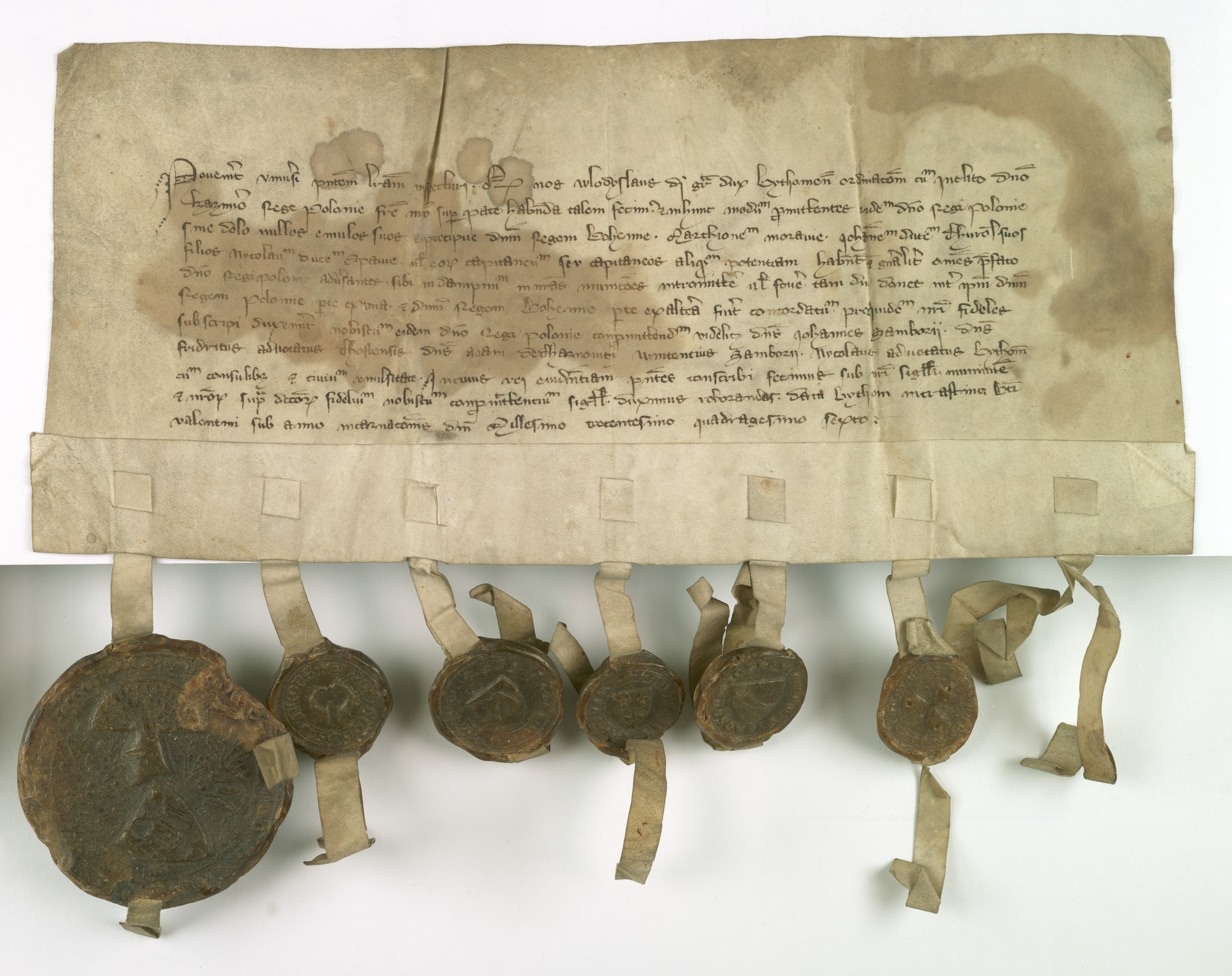
Władysław of Bytom agrees not to support anyone against the Polish king, Casimir the Great, and in particular the Czech king. Parchment from February 1346

For unknown reasons, after his father's death in 1312 Władysław retained only Koźle, and the capital of the Duchy, Bytom was given to his younger brother Siemowit. Also, the two of Casimir I's sons who followed the church career also received further lands: Bolesław obtained Toszek and Mieszko received Siewierz (another brother, George was the co-ruler of Władysław, and in fact exercised the whole government).

In 1316 Władysław assumed the government over Bytom. The circumstances around the removal of Siemowit are unknown, and the next notices about him are found only on 19 February 1327, where Władysław, Siemowit and George paid homage to the Bohemian King John of Luxembourg in Opawa. One year before (1315) his brothers Bolesław and Mieszko chosen to live in Hungary and put their lands under the regency of Władysław.

In 1328, Mieszko formally resigned his domain over Siewierz on Władysław's behalf and one year later (1329), the death of Bolesław allowed the Duke of Koźle to reunite the whole paternal lands under his rule. However, this unity didn't remain for too long. The continuous financial problems forced Władysław to sold part of his inheritance. First, on 21 February 1334 he pledged the town of Koźle to his cousin Duke Leszek of Racibórz by the amount of 4,000 pieces of silver with the compromise that, in the event of his death without issue, Koźle return to the Duchy of Bytom. Leszek died two years later, in 1336, and according to the terms of the pledge Koźle would return to Władysław, but soon after he was forced to give this lands to his eldest son Casimir, and after his death in 1347, the town was given to his younger brother Bolesław.

In 1337 Władysław suffered further territorial losses. Firstly, on 8 May he sold Siewierz to Duke Casimir I of Cieszyn and at the end of that year, he gave to his cousin Duke Bolko II of Opole the town of Toszek by the amount of 100 fines. Finally, around 1340 Władysław decided to give Gliwice to his brother Siemowit as a separate Duchy.

Władysław's extremely cautious politics radically changed: in the course of Polish-Bohemian War during the years 1345-1348 he stood at the side of the Polish Kingdom, especially after the unexpected victories in the Battles of Pogoń (now Sosnowiec) and Lelów. In 1345 Władysław could repelled the attack of the Bohemian troops and on 15 February 1346 he signed a treaty with King Casimir III of Poland under which the latter agreed to provide military help against Bohemia. Unfortunately, Poland wasn't able to use this great possibility of extending his influence on the Upper Silesia, and after 1348 Władysław was found again as an ally of Bohemia.

Władysław died before 8 September 1352 and it's unknown where he was buried. His lands were inherited by his only surviving son, Bolesław. Soon before his death, Władysław concluded an agreement with the Bohemian King allowing the succession of women in his Duchy, which happened in 1355 and caused the division of Bytom between the Dukes of Oleśnica and Cieszyn.

== Marriages and Issue ==
By 21 September 1308, Władysław married firstly Beatrix (b. ca. 1270 – d. bef. 26 April 1316), daughter of Otto V the Long, Margrave of Brandenburg-Salzwedel and widow of Bolko I the Strict, Duke of Świdnica. They had two children:

1. Casimir (b. ca. 1312 – by 2 March 1347).
2. Euphemia (b. ca. 1313? – d. 3 January 1378), married by 2 March 1333 to Duke Konrad I of Oleśnica.

By 6 April 1328, Władysław married secondly Ludgarda (b. ca. 1316 - d. by 3 June 1362), daughter of Henry II the Lion, Prince of Mecklenburg and Lord of Stargard. They had six children:

1. Agnes (b. ca. 1328 – d. 7 April 1362), Abbess of Trzebnica (1348).
2. Katharina (b. 1329/30 – d. aft. 29 May 1377), Abbess of Trzebnica (1362).
3. Bolesław (b. 1330 – d. by 4 October 1355).
4. Beatrix (b. ca. 1335 – 20 February 1364), married on 15 May 1357 to Count Berthold of Hardegg.
5. Elencza (d. 9 July 1339), a nun in Racibórz.
6. A son (bef. 8 May 1337 – d. bef. 1355).

== Footnotes ==
Władysław of Bytom House of Piast Died: 1352
Regnal titles
Preceded by Casimir	Duke of Koźle; 1303–1334	Succeeded by Leszek
Preceded by Siemowit	Duke of Bytom with George (until 1327); 1316–1352	Succeeded by Bolesław
Preceded by Mieszko	Duke of Siewierz; 1328–1337	Succeeded by Casimir I
