= Casimir I of Cieszyn =

Polish noble (died 1358)

- Coat-of-arms of Upper Silesia (Opole, Cieszyn, etc.)
- Born: 1280/1290
- Died: c. 29 September 1358
- Noble family: Silesian Piasts of Opole
- Spouse: Euphemia of Czersk
- Issue: Władysław of Cieszyn; Jolanta Helena; Bolesław; Przemyslaus I Noszak; Agnes; Jan of Cieszyn; Siemowit of Cieszyn; Elisabeth of Cieszyn
- Father: Mieszko I, Duke of Cieszyn
- Mother: ?Grzymisława Vsevolodovna of Belz

Casimir I of Cieszyn (Polish: Kazimierz I cieszyński, Czech: Kazimír I. Těšínský, German: Kasimir I. von Teschen; 1280/1290 – c. 29 September 1358), was Duke of Cieszyn from 1315, Duke of Siewierz from 1337 and Duke of Bytom from 1357.

He was the second son of Mieszko I, Duke of Cieszyn by his wife, probably called Grzymisława.

== Life ==
After the death of his father in 1315, Casimir I gained the southwestern part of the duchy, centered around the town of Cieszyn. His marriage to Euphemia of Czersk founded a tradition of relationships of Cieszyn Piasts with Masovian Piasts.

Casimir I initially had good relations with Władysław I Łokietek (Władysław I the Elbow-high), who became the King of Poland in 1320. But when, during 1321–1324, Lithuanian forces supporting Elbow-high plundered Cieszyn, Casimir I broke with the Polish King. He then became a closer ally of John of Bohemia, King of Bohemia and swore homage to him on 8 February 1327 in Opava; in exchange for his submission, Casimir I received the promise of inheritance of Oświęcim. Fifteen days later, on 23 February, he received Cieszyn as a hereditary possession, maintaining a large internal sovereignty.

Casimir I wanted to maintain the territorial unity of his Duchy, so he chose only one of his sons to be his successor – firstly the eldest, Władysław, and after his early death in 1355, the third, but the only one who remained outside the Church, Przemysław Noszak – and the others were destined for a Church career. In 1337, he acquired the districts of Siewierz and Czeladź from the Dukes of Bytom by 720 fines; also, he (temporarily) took the town of Namysłów from the Dukes of Brzeg, as a part of the dowry of his daughter Anna.

When Duke Leszek of Racibórz died in 1336, Casimir I tried unsuccessfully to obtain his lands. King John of Bohemia granted this land to Duke Nicholas II of Opava.

In 1355, after the death of Bolesław, Duke of Koźle-Bytom without male issue, Casimir I entered a conflict over his inheritance with Konrad I of Oleśnica. The dispute was only resolved in 1357 (the decision was made as early as 1355, but Bytom remained until that time under the rule of Margareta of Sternberg — Bolesław's widow — as her dower): the Duke of Cieszyn took possession of half of Bytom and Gliwice, Toszek and Pyskowice.

In the internal politics, Casimir I supported the economic development of his Duchy, mostly in towns. He also surrounded Cieszyn with walls and, by 1320, granted the town of Bielsko with German laws.

Casimir I died in 1358 (although there are some indications that he lived until 1360, but this is refuted by the majority of historians) and was buried in the Dominican church of Cieszyn.

== Marriage and issue ==
By 1321, Casimir I married Euphemia (b. 1310 – d. aft. 11 January 1374), daughter of Trojden I, Duke of Masovia of Czersk-Warsaw. They had nine children:

1. Anna (b. 1325 – d. 1367), married in 1338 to Duke Wenceslaus I of Legnica;
2. Władysław of Cieszyn (d. 1355) (b. 1325/1331 – d. May 1355);
3. Jolanta Helena (b. c. 1331 – d. 20 March 1403), Abbess of St. Clara in Kraków;
4. Bolesław of Cieszyn (died 1356) (b. c. 1331/1332 – d. Prague, 23 July 1356);
5. Przemyslaus I Noszak, Duke of Cieszyn (b. 1332/1336 – d. 23 May 1410);
6. Agnes (b. 1338 – d. by 27 April 1371), married by 23 February 1354 to Duke Konrad II the Gray;
7. Jan of Cieszyn (b. 1339/40 – d. aft. 18 May 1359);
8. Siemowit of Cieszyn (b. c. 1340 – d. 25 September 1391);
9. Elisabeth of Cieszyn (b. aft. 1340? – d. aft. 20 January 1364), a nun in Trzebnica.

== Ancestry ==
Ancestors of Casimir I of Cieszyn

16. Mieszko I Tanglefoot
8. Casimir I of Opole
17. Ludmilla
4. Władysław Opolski
9. Viola
2. Mieszko I, Duke of Cieszyn
20. Odon of Poznań
10. Władysław Odonic
21. Viacheslava Yaroslavna of Halych
5. Euphemia of Greater Poland
22. Mestwin I, Duke of Pomerania
11. Jadwiga
23. Swinisława
1. Casimir I, Duke of Cieszyn

== Bibliography ==
- Panic, Idzi (2002). Poczet Piastów i Piastówien cieszyńskich. Cieszyn: Urząd Miejski. ISBN 83-917095-4-X.

Casimir I of Cieszyn House of Piast Born: 1280 Died: 1358
Regnal titles
Preceded by Mieszko I, Duke of Cieszyn	Duke of Cieszyn; 1315 – 1358	Succeeded by Przemyslaus I Noszak, Duke of Cieszyn
Preceded by Władysław of Bytom	Duke of Siewierz; 1337 – 1358	Succeeded by Przemyslaus I Noszak, Duke of Cieszyn
Preceded by Margareta of Sternberg	Duke of Bytom (1/2); 1357 – 1358	Succeeded by Przemyslaus I Noszak, Duke of Cieszyn
