= Beatrice of Brandenburg =

German noblewoman

- Born: c. 1270
- Died: before 26 April 1316
- Noble family: House of Ascania
- Spouses: Bolko I the Strict; Władysław of Bytom
- Issue: With Bolko; Judith; Bolko; Beatrice of Silesia; Bernard of Świdnica; Henry I of Jawor; Elisabeth; Bolko II of Ziębice unknown son Anna; With Władysław; Casimir of Koźle; Euphemia
- Father: Otto V, Margrave of Brandenburg-Salzwedel
- Mother: Judith of Henneberg

Beatrice of Brandenburg (Polish: Beatrycze brandenburska, German: Beatrix von Brandenburg; also Beatrix of Fürstenberg; c. 1270 – before 26 April 1316), was a German princess and a member of the House of Ascania in the Brandenburg branch. By her two marriages she was Duchess of Świdnica and Koźle-Bytom-Siewierz.

She was the second daughter of Otto V the Long, Margrave of Brandenburg-Salzwedel, by his wife Judith of Henneberg, daughter of Count Herman I of Henneberg and heiress of Coburg and Schmalkalden.

== Life ==
=== Family ===
Beatrice had six siblings, three brothers and three sisters. From her brothers, Albert and Otto died young and the eldest, Herman, inherited the whole paternal domains. Beatrice's young sister Matilda married in 1287/88 with Henry IV Probus, Duke of Wrocław and High Duke of Poland. The other two sisters are Kunigunde, who died unmarried, and Judith, married in 1303 with Rudolf I, Duke of Saxe-Wittenberg. It is probable that the wedding of Beatrice into the Silesian branch of the Piast dynasty was instrumental to Matilda's future wedding with Henry IV.

=== First marriage ===
One of the first tasks of Bolko I the Strict as sole Duke of Świdnica was protect his modest inheritance from the growing power of Henry IV Probus, Duke of Wrocław. To that end, he decided to enter in an alliance with the Margraves of Brandenburg, cemented with the betrothal between him and Beatrice, who took in the city of Spandau on 19 April 1279; however, because of the close relationship between the groom and bride, the formal wedding was performed more than five years later, on 4 October 1284 in the city of Berlin (although the Papal dispensation to allow the wedding was announced one year later, in 1285).

Together Bolko I and Beatrice had ten children:

1. Judith (born c. 1287 – died Landshut, 15 September 1320), married in 1299 to Stephen I, Duke of Lower Bavaria.
2. Bolko (born c. 1288 – died 30 January 1300).
3. Beatrix (born 1290 – died Munich, 25 August 1322), married by 14 October 1308 to Louis IV, Duke of Upper Bavaria, later German King and Holy Roman Emperor.
4. Bernard (born c. 1291 – died 6 May 1326).
5. Henry I (born 1292/96 – died before 15 May 1346).
6. Elisabeth (born and died 1300).
7. Margareta (born and died 1300) [twin of Elisabeth?].
8. Bolko II (born 1 February 1300 – died 11 June 1341).
9. A son (born c. early 1301 – 24 December 1307).
10. Anna (born posthumously, 21 November 1301 – died before 24 June 1334), Abbess of St. Clara, Strehlen (1327).

=== Second Marriage ===
Bolko I died suddenly on 9 November 1301, and was buried in Grüssau Abbey. At the time, Beatrice was heavily pregnant with their youngest daughter, Anna, who was born two weeks later. Bolko I was succeeded by his sons, who, as they were still minors, required a regent. At this time either Beatrice became regent herself, with support from her brother Herman, Margrave of Brandenburg-Salzwedel or Herman was regent on her and her sons' behalf. The custody of Henry V the Fat's sons and the regency of his lands were taken by King Wenceslaus II of Bohemia.

After almost seven years of widowhood, Beatrice remarried by 21 September 1308 to Władysław, Duke of Koźle-Bytom-Siewierz. They had two children:

1. Casimir (born c. 1312 – by 2 March 1347).
2. Euphemia (born c. 1313 – died 3 January 1378), married by 2 March 1333 to Duke Konrad I of Oleśnica.

Beatrice died in 1316 and had outlived four of her twelve children.
