= Siemowit of Cieszyn =

Silesian nobleman (died 1391)

Siemowit
- Knight of Teutonic Order; Governor and Treasurer of the Order in Germany
- Coat-of-arms of Upper Silesia (Cieszyn, etc).
- Born: c. 1340
- Died: 25 September 1391
- Noble family: Silesian Piasts
- Father: Casimir I, Duke of Cieszyn
- Mother: Euphemia of Warsaw

Siemowit of Cieszyn (Polish: Siemowit cieszyński) (c. 1340 – 25 September 1391) was a Polish prince, member of the Piast dynasty in the Cieszyn branch.

He was the son of Casimir I, Duke of Cieszyn, by his wife Euphemia, daughter of Duke Trojden I of Czersk-Warsaw.

== Life ==
Like most of Casimir I's children, Siemowit was destined to the cleric since his early years, together with two of his sisters (Jolanta Helena and Elisabeth), and two of his brothers (Bolesław and Jan). The main reason for why Casimir I put three of his five sons to follow a church career was to prevent further division of the already small Duchy of Cieszyn between them after his death. In addition, the Duke of Cieszyn, as a loyal vassal of the Bohemian Kings, hoped to obtain the help of them in obtaining high ecclesiastical dignities for his sons.

As a Teutonic Knight, Siemowit was named komturem of Oleśnica Mała near Oława sometime before 1362 and prior of Poland, Bohemia, Austria, Moravia, Styria and Carinthia in 1372. He was Governor and Treasurer of the Order in Germany since 1384.

Siemowit's place of burial is unknown.
