= Elisabeth of Cieszyn =

Polish noblewoman (died 1364)

Elisabeth of Cieszyn (Polish: Elżbieta cieszyńska; after 1340? – after 20 January 1364), was a Polish princess, member of the Piast dynasty in the Cieszyn branch.

She was the fourth daughter and youngest child of Casimir I, Duke of Cieszyn, by his wife Euphemia, daughter of Duke Trojden I of Czersk-Warsaw.

== Life ==
From childhood, Elisabeth was destined for the Church by her father, like her older brothers Bolesław, Jan and Siemowit and her older sister Jolanta Helena.

Elisabeth entered as a nun in the Cistercian monastery of Trzebnica. Presumably in 1363, she fled from the Trzebnica monastery and began a relationship with John Henry, Margrave of Moravia, brother of Emperor Charles IV. The scandalous news soon reached Rome. By a letter dated on 20 January 1364, Pope Urban V demanded of the Bishop of Wrocław, Przecław of Pogarell, that he convince Elisabeth to break her concubinage with the Margrave of Moravia and return to the Trzebnica monastery. Soon afterwards, the liaison between Elisabeth and John Henry ended, and by 26 February 1364 the Margrave of Moravia was married for the third time, to Margareta, daughter of Albert II, Duke of Austria.

Elisabeth's later fate is unknown, as are the date of her death and the place of her burial.
