= Przemyslaus I Noszak =

Polish nobleman (1334–1410)

- Duke of Cieszyn, Bytom, Siewierz
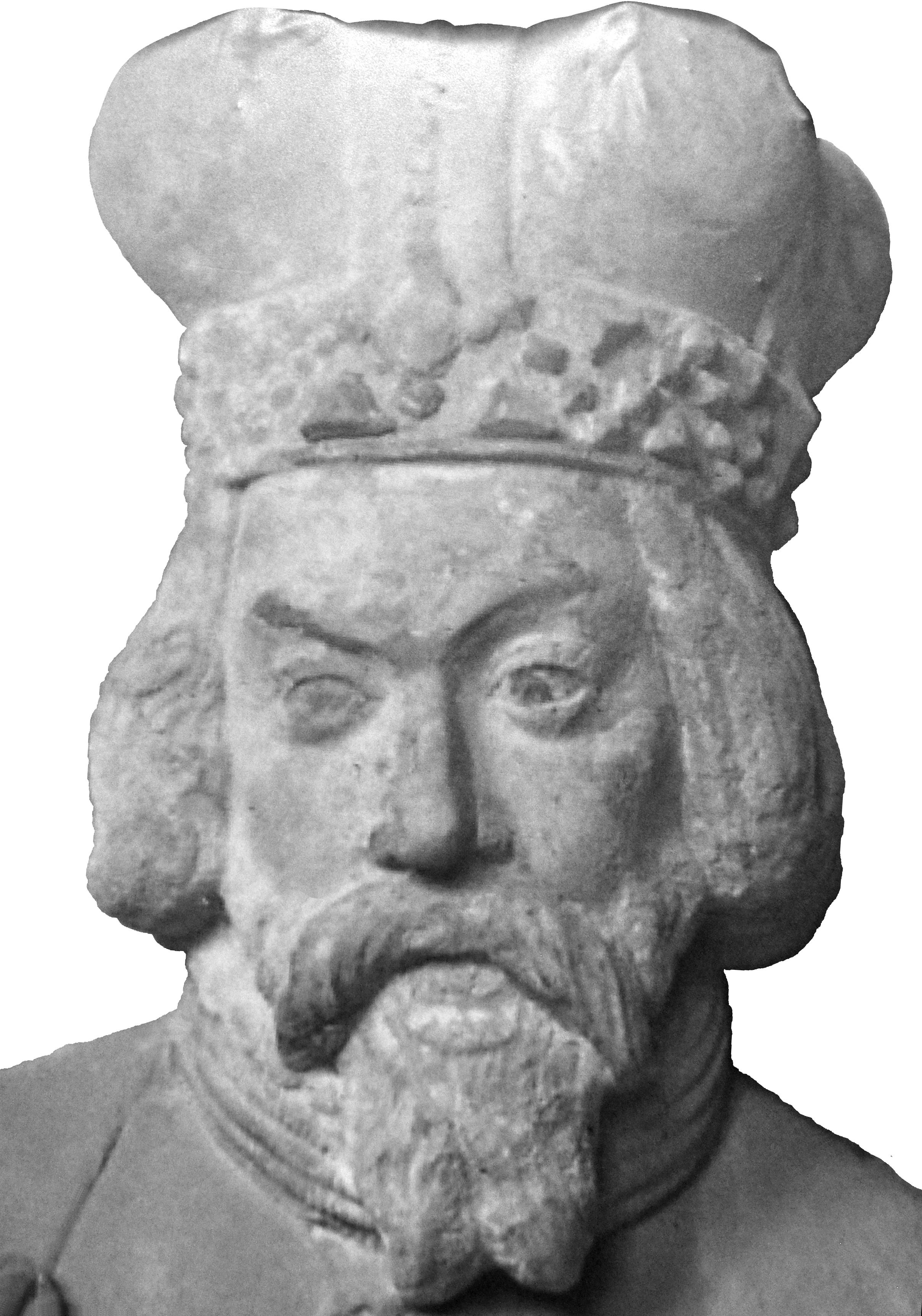
- A sculpture atop a ducal tomb in Cieszyn from the beginning of the 15th century
- Born: 13 February 1334
- Died: 23 May 1410 (aged 76)
- Noble family: Silesian Piasts of Opole
- Spouse: Elisabeth of Bytom
- Issue: Przemysław; Bolesław I Margaret; Anna
- Father: Casimir I, Duke of Cieszyn
- Mother: Euphemia of Czersk

Przemysław I Noszak (Polish: Przemysław I Noszak, Czech: Přemyslav I. Nošák, German: Przemislaus I. von Teschen; 13 February 1334 – 23 May 1410), was a Duke of Cieszyn-Bytom-Siewierz from 1358 (during 1359–1368 he lost Siewierz and in 1405 also lost Bytom), from 1384 ruler over half of both Głogów and Ścinawa (except during 1404–1406) and after 1401 ruler over Toszek.

He was the third son of Casimir I, Duke of Cieszyn, by his wife Euphemia, daughter of Duke Trojden I of Czersk-Warsaw.

== Life ==
At first, it seemed that Przemysław had no better chance of getting any part of his father's inheritance; however, the early deaths of his older brothers Władysław (in 1355) and Bolesław (in 1356) made him the main heir of Duke Casimir I.

From 1355 Przemysław began his political life at the court of Emperor Charles IV, where a year later he received the dignity of court judge after the death of his brother Władysław. After his father's death in 1358 he took full control over Cieszyn, without interrupting his diplomatic career.

His marriage to Elisabeth, daughter of Bolesław, Duke of Koźle-Bytom in 1360 give him additional rights over the half of Bytom taken by his father Casimir I in 1357. The dispute over these lands with the Dukes of Oleśnica was definitely resolved in 1358. Casimir I remained as legal guardian over the three daughters of the late Duke of Bytom: Elisabeth (Przemysław's future wife), Euphemia and Bolka, who had to renounce all their claims over half of Bytom and Koźle, so the Dukes of Cieszyn took almost the whole inheritance of Duke Bolesław (except Koźle and half of Bytom, which was taken by the Dukes of Oleśnica). Unfortunately, the acquisition of Bytom didn't last.

Przemysław quickly became one of the most important figures in the court of Prague, and Emperor Charles IV entrusted him with numerous (and sometimes very difficult) tasks. In 1361 he helped to conclude the agreement between Prague and the margraves of Brandenburg and was involved in the acquisition of the Wittelsbach's succession by Charles IV. Also, he successfully dismantled the alliance between the King Louis I of Hungary and the German princes. Przemysław's position was supported by the fact that he participated in the famous Congress of Wierzynek in Kraków.

In 1380 he was sent to Paris where he was supposed to help maintain the alliance between Bohemia and France. This mission was, however, unsuccessful. He also tried to negotiate the peace between England and France, who were engaged in the Hundred Years' War. Przemysław also negotiated the marriage of Princess Anne of Bohemia, Charles IV's daughter, to Richard II, King of England. His own daughter, Princess Margaret traveled to England with Anne as her lady-in-waiting. As a reward for the successful negotiations, the Duke of Cieszyn received from King Richard II an annual salary of 500 pounds. Thanks to the negotiations with England, the relations between Przemysław and Charles IV's successor, Wenceslaus IV, were considerably improved. The Bohemian king, who was also King of the Romans, appointed the Duke of Cieszyn as his Vicar in the German countries. In this new office, Przemysław's diplomatic skills were used in several disputes between various members of the local nobility, for example, in the peaces of Heidelberg and Koblenz and in 1389, during the negotiations about the borders between the Bohemian Kingdom and Meissen.

In the second half of the 1380s, Przemysław became active in the internal politics of Bohemia. In 1386 he acted as Governor of Bohemia when King Wenceslaus IV was abroad. Tensions between the local and foreign nobility escalated and he was eventually removed from his positions by the Bohemian nobility. His position was filled by Jan II of Iron, Duke of Racibórz. This resulted in a deep hostility between the two Dukes. The high point of this dispute was the murder of the Cieszyn Duke's eldest son Przemysław on 1 January 1406 in the town of Rybnik, during his return from Gliwice to Cieszyn, by a certain Martin Chrzan, who acted under instructions of Duke Jan II. The conflict was finally ended by a peace treaty signed on 7 November 1407 in Żory.

As a result of the unstable situation in Bohemia, banditry acts increased. Przemysław's diplomatic efforts resulted in a treaty with King Władysław II Jagiełło of Poland, signed on 12 June 1397, where both sides pledged to fight banditry in the borderlands. Przemysław gained the trust of the Polish king, who appointed him Governor of Kraków, where he remained until 1401. The Duke also took part in negotiations with the Polish Teutonic Knights in 1410, but without positive results.

After 1378 Przemysław increasingly began to suffer from gout. The disease eventually left the former vigorous Duke a complete invalid, so he was forced to use a litter. It was at this time that the Duke of Cieszyn became known by his nickname: Noszak (from Polish "nosić", to carry) The progressive disease forced Przemysław in 1396 to abandon his interference in Bohemian politics.

During his reign, Przemysław also extended his possessions and gained lands surrounding Toszek and Pyskowice and half of the Bytom and Gliwice lands. In 1359 he sold Siewierz to Duke Bolko II the Small of Świdnica for the amount of 2,300 fines (the land returned to him only after Bolko II's death in 1368). After the dispute with Konrad I of Oleśnica, Przemysław managed to obtain, in the redistribution of the Duchy of Koźle-Bytom, the southern part of the Duchy. During 1378-1382 he also took from his relative the Dukes of Racibórz the town of Żory. Finally, with the support of King Wenceslas IV, in 1384 he obtained half of both Głogów and Ścinawa and one year later (in 1385), he bought Strzelin to Duke Bolko III of Ziębice. Also, Przemysław annexed to his Duchy the town of Zator, given to him by the Emperor Charles IV in 1372. In 1401, the Duke of Cieszyn acquired the town of Toszek.

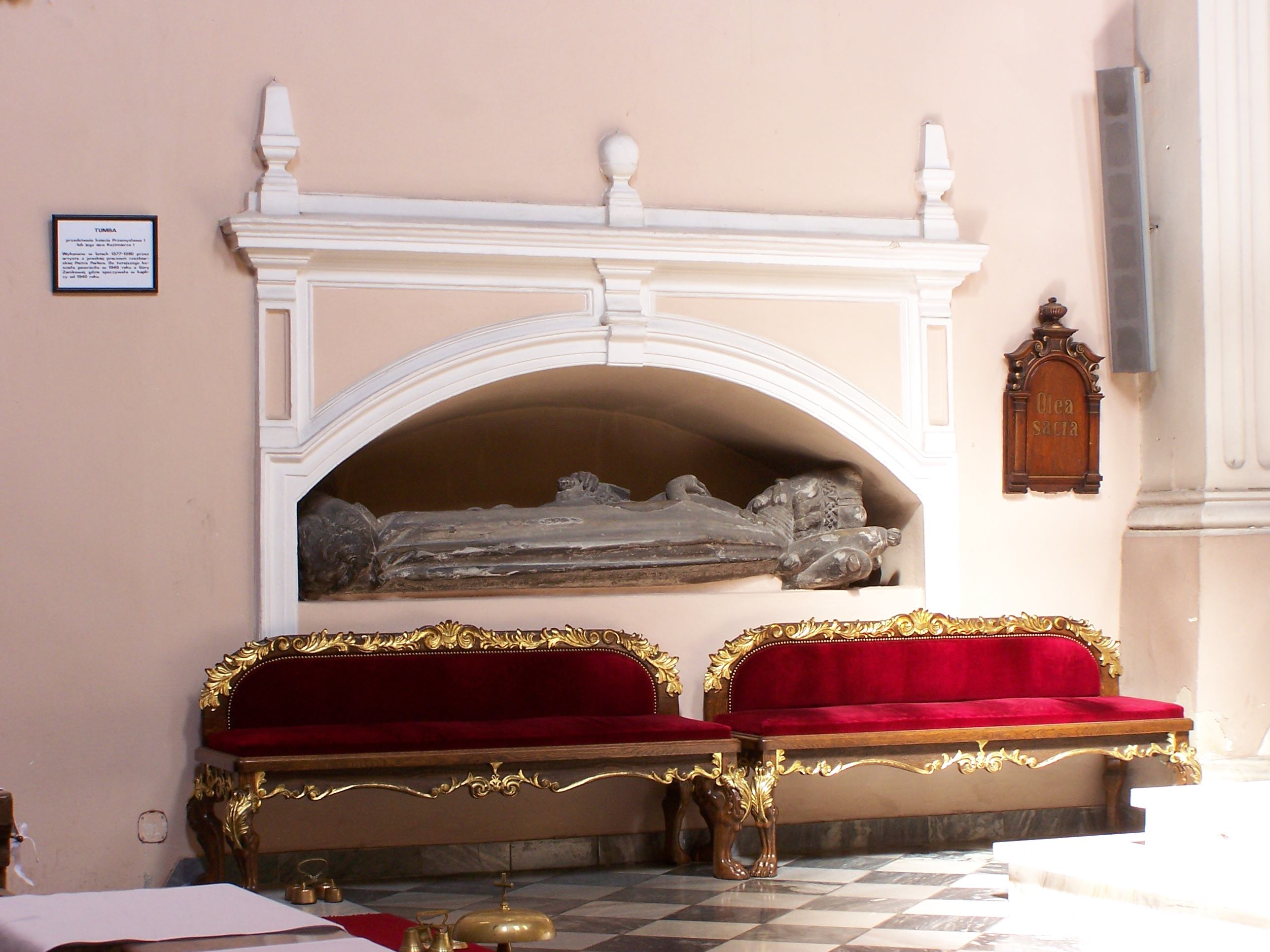
Tombstone of Przemysław I Noszak

As the closest male relative of Duke Jan III of Oświęcim, Przemysław obtained the right of succession of his Duchy in case of his death without issue; in 1405, after Jan III's death, the Duke of Cieszyn inherited Oświęcim, but immediately he ceded them (with Zator) to his eldest son and namesake Przemysław, who one year before (in 1404) received the government of half of Głogów and half of Ścinawa. After Przemysław's death in 1406, half of Głogów and half of Ścinawa returned to the Duke of Cieszyn. Oświęcim was inherited by the late Duke's only son, Casimir, who, a minor at that time, was placed under the regency of his grandfather, and after his death, of his uncle Bolesław I, who received the independent rule of Bytom and Toszek in 1405.

He is regarded as one of the most skilled Piast Dukes of Cieszyn. He was a skilled diplomat and negotiator, experienced in many diplomatic efforts in several European countries. His internal politics in the Duchy thus remains little known.

Przemysław I Noszak died on 23 May 1410 and was buried in the Dominican church of Cieszyn.

== Marriage and issue ==
By 1360, Przemysław married Elisabeth (b. ca. 1347/50 – d. 1374), daughter of Bolesław, Duke of Koźle -Bytom. They had four children:

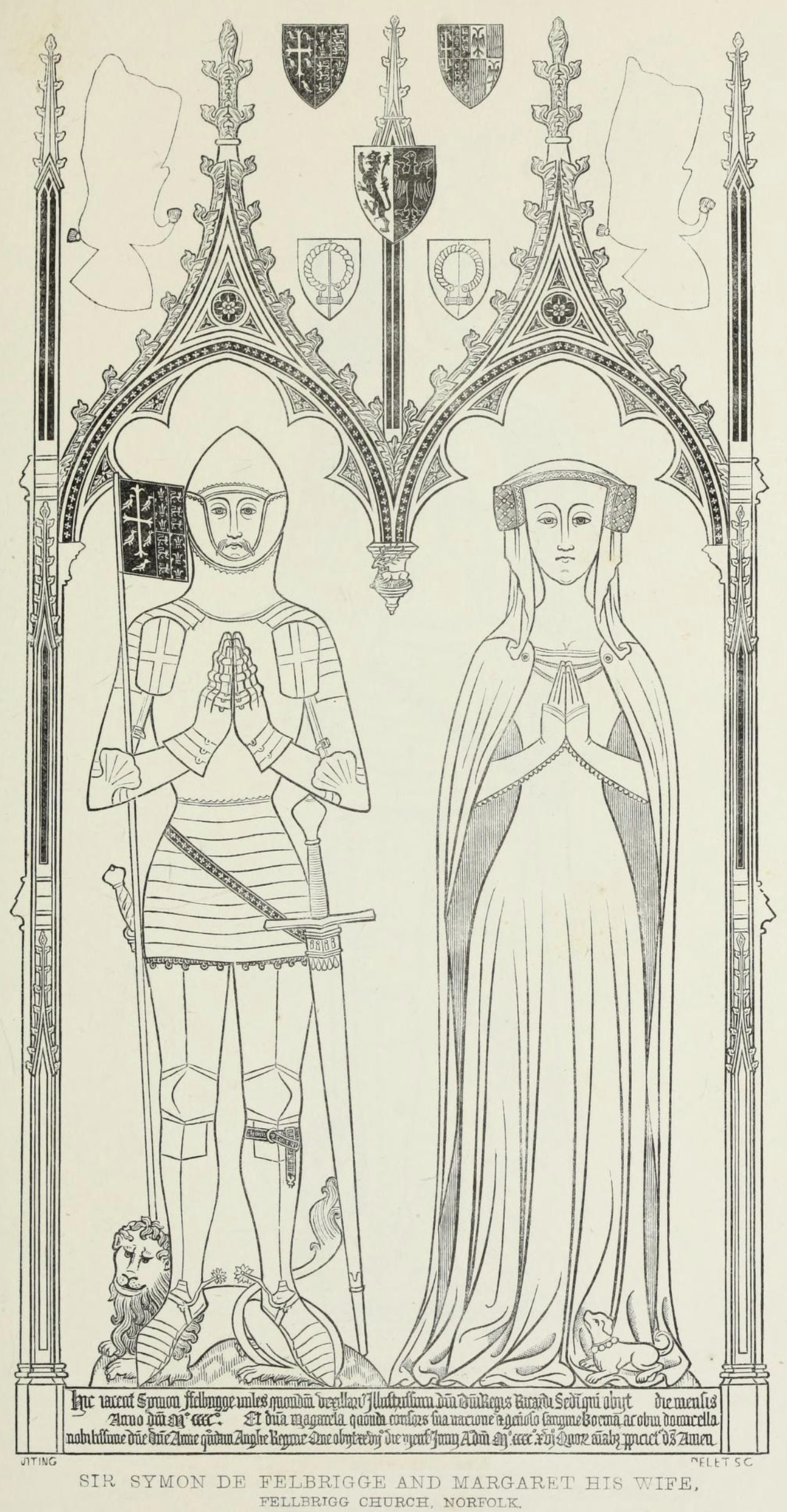
Monumental brass of Sir Simon de Felbrigg (d.1351) and his wife Margaret (d.1416), a daughter of Przemyslaus I Noszak, Duke of Cieszyn. Felbrigg Church, Norfolk

1. Przemysław (b. ca. 1362 – d. 1 January 1406)
2. Bolesław I (b. ca. 1363 – d. 6 May 1431)
3. Margaret (b. ca. 1365/70 – d. 27 June 1413), lady-in-waiting to Anne of Bohemia, the first wife of King Richard II of England. She married Sir Simon de Felbrigg (d.1351), Knight of the Garter, of Felbrigg Hall in Norfolk, Standard Bearer to King Richard II. His monumental brass in Felbrigg Church displays the paternal arms of his wife and is inscribed: Here lie Simon Felbrigg, knight, former Standard bearer to the most illustrious lord, our lord the King Richard the Second. He died on the ...day of the month of ... in the year of our Lord 14.. and the lady Margaret formerly his wife, of the nation and noble blood of Bohemia and formerly maid of honour to the most noble lady Anne, Queen of England; she died on the 27th day of June in the year of our Lord 1416; upon whose souls may God have mercy; Amen.
4. Anna (b. bef. 1374 – d. 8 July bef. 1405/1420?), married on 20 September 1396 to Duke Henry IX of Lubin.

== Footnotes ==
Przemyslaus I Noszak House of Piast Born: 1332/36 Died: 1410
Regnal titles
Preceded by Casimir I	Duke of Cieszyn; 1358–1410	Succeeded by Bolesław I
Preceded by Casimir I	Duke of Bytom (1/2); 1358–1405	Succeeded by Bolesław I
Preceded by Casimir I	Duke of Siewierz; 1358–1359	Succeeded by Bolko II the Small
Preceded by Bolko II the Small	Duke of Siewierz; 1368–1410	Succeeded by Bolesław I
Vacant Direct sovereignty of the Kingdom of Bohemia Title last held by Bolko II the Small	Duke of Głogów (1/2); 1384–1404	Succeeded by Przemysław
Vacant Direct sovereignty of the Kingdom of Bohemia Title last held by Bolko II the Small	Duke of Ścinawa (1/2); 1384–1404	Succeeded by Przemysław
Preceded by Przemysław	Duke of Głogów (1/2); 1406–1410	Succeeded by Bolesław I
Preceded by Przemysław	Duke of Ścinawa (1/2); 1406–1410	Succeeded by Bolesław I
