= Jan of Cieszyn =

14th-century Polish prince and clergyman

Jan
- Reverend of twenty Wrocław dioceses
- Coat-of-arms of Upper Silesia (Cieszyn, etc)
- Born: 1339/40
- Died: after 18 May 1359
- Noble family: Silesian Piasts
- Father: Casimir I, Duke of Cieszyn
- Mother: Euphemia of Warsaw

Jan of Cieszyn (Polish: Jan cieszyński; 1339/40 – after 18 May 1359), was a Polish prince, member of the Piast dynasty in the Cieszyn branch.

He was the fourth son of Casimir I, Duke of Cieszyn, by his wife Euphemia, daughter of Duke Trojden I of Czersk-Warsaw.

== Life ==
Like most of Casimir I's children, Jan was destined to the cleric since his early years, together with two of his sisters (Jolanta Helena and Elisabeth), and two of his brothers (Bolesław and Siemowit). The main reason for why Casimir I put three of his five sons to follow a church career was to prevent further division of the already small Duchy of Cieszyn between them after his death. In addition, the Duke of Cieszyn, as a loyal vassal of the Bohemian Kings, hoped to obtain the help of them in obtaining high ecclesiastical dignities for his sons.

Jan is mentioned in a Papal document of 18 May 1359 issued in Avignon. There is appointed as reverend of twenty Wrocław dioceses. Sources are silent about him after this, so is supposed that soon after he died prematurely. Some historians exposed the possibility that Jan had died before the issue of the Papal decree and the notice of his death not yet reached to Avignon.

Jan's place of burial is unknown.
