= Margareta of Toszek =

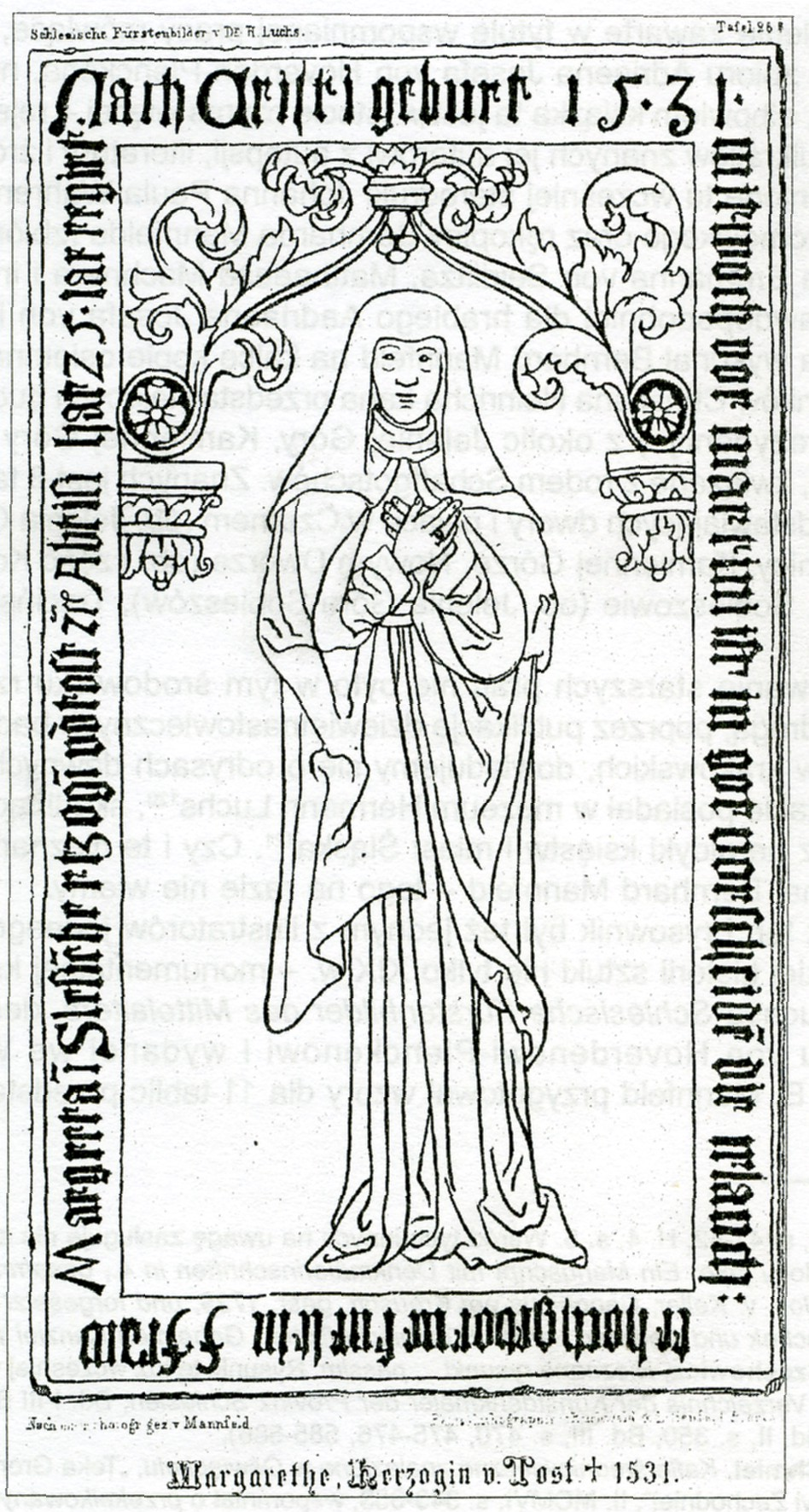
Tombstone of Margareta of Toszek

Margareta of Toszek (Polish: Małgorzata toszecka; 1467/68 – 8 November 1531), was a Polish princess and abbess of the Poor Clares.

== Life ==
She was the only child of Duke Przemysław of Toszek and Margareta, daughter of Duke Nicholas I of Opole, and thereby a member of the House of Piast in the Oświęcim branch. Around 1481 or 1482 Margareta became a nun in the monastery of St. Klara in Wrocław. In February 1508 she was elected abbess. Margareta held this post until 3 February 1515; however, six months later, on 27 August 1515, she was elected again abbess and held this office until her death. She was buried in the Piast Mausoleum of St. Klara in Wrocław.
