= Henry I of Ziębice =

Henry I
- Duke of Ziębice
- Coat-of-arms of Ziębice
- Born: c. 1350
- Died: after 8 August 1366
- Noble family: Silesian Piasts
- Father: Nicholas the Small
- Mother: Agnes Krušina of Lichtenberg

Henry I of Ziębice (Polish: Henryk I Ziębicki; c. 1350 – after 8 August 1366) was a titular Duke of Ziębice from 1358 until his death.

He was the second and youngest son of Nicholas the Small, Duke of Ziębice, by his wife Agnes, daughter of Herman Krušina of Lichtenberg.

== Life ==
After his father's early death in 1358, Henry I and his older brother Bolko III succeeded him in the Duchy of Ziębice as co-rulers; however, because they are minor at that time, their mother, the Dowager Duchess Agnes held the regency on their behalf until 1360, when Bolko III assumed the government of the Duchy by himself and take the guardianship of his brother.

In order to avoid further divisions of the already small Duchy of Ziębice, Henry I was destined since his early youth to a Church career. On 17 August 1360 he received from Pope Innocent VI the Canonry of the Chapter of Wrocław, although is known that he early received the prebendary of the Church of Holy Cross, also in Wrocław.

According to the "Chronicles of the Polish Dukes" (Kroniki książąt polskich), Henry I joined to the Teutonic Order and died in Prussia after he left the Order. The exact date of his death is unknown, although was certainly between 1366 and 1370.

Henry I of Ziębice House of Piast Born: c. 1350 Died: between 1366 and 1370
Preceded by Nicholas the Small	Duke of Ziębice with Bolko III; 1358 – c. 1366	Succeeded by Bolko III
