= Przemysław of Oświęcim =

Silesian duke (died 1406)

- Coat-of-arms of Opole.
- Born: c. 1362
- Died: 1 January 1406
- Noble family: Silesian Piasts of Opole
- Issue: Casimir I of Oświęcim
- Father: Przemyslaus I Noszak, Duke of Cieszyn
- Mother: Elisabeth of Bytom

Przemysław of Oświęcim (Polish: Przemysław Oświęcimski) (c. 1362 – 1 January 1406) was a Duke of half of both Głogów and Ścinawa since 1404 and Duke of Oświęcim from 1405 until his death.

He was the eldest son of Przemysław I Noszak, Duke of Cieszyn by his wife Elisabeth, daughter of Bolesław, Duke of Koźle-Bytom. In the chronicle of Jan Długosz he is named the second son, but this is certainly a mistake, because elsewhere, he was always placed in first place before his brother Bolesław I.

== Life ==
Przemysław initially appeared only in the documents issued by his father. His independent rule began on 23 June 1404, when, under the provisions of King Wenceslaus IV of Bohemia, the young prince received as a fief Góra Śląska and half of both Głogów and Ścinawa (although some historians stated that this diploma refers to his father, Duke Przemysław I Noszak).

In 1405, after the death of Duke Jan III of Oświęcim without issue, (and by virtue of the Privilege of 1372), his domains were inherited by Duke Przemysław I Noszak. Shortly after, the Duke granted this land to his eldest son and namesake, who since them assumed the title of Duke of Oświęcim.

The good government of Przemysław over Oświęcim suddenly ended on 1 January 1406. The circumstances of the young Duke's murder were known thanks to the Chronicle of Jan Długosz, who describes these events but with the incorrectly date of 1 January 1400. By that time, Przemysław was still alive, as is proved in a document from 1402 concerning to the acquisition of Oświęcim, which could take place in early 1405. The Duke of Oświęcim, while traveling from Gliwice to Cieszyn, was killed in the town of Rybnik by a certain Martin Chrzan. The murder was most likely made at the request of Jan II of Iron, Duke of Racibórz, who, after replaced Duke Przemysław I Noszak as Governor of Bohemia, became in a personal enemy of the Duke of Cieszyn. Przemysław of Oświęcim was buried in the Dominican church in Cieszyn.

The punishment given to the murderer Martin Chrzan was colorfully described by Jan Długosz: He (the murderer) was placed on the bronze horse who was in the middle of incandescent coals and this showed in all the Cieszyn streets; later the three executioners cut his body into pieces, and they finally were thrown into a river.

== Marriage and issue ==
The name and origins of Przemysław's wife are unknown. They had one son:

1. Casimir I (b. 1396 – d. 7 April 1434).

After the death of Przemysław, half of Głogów and Ścinawa returned to his father and Oświęcim was given to his minor son Casimir I, who remained under the successive regencies of his grandfather and uncle until 1414, when he was able to rule by himself.

== Footnotes ==
Przemysław of Oświęcim House of Piast Born: c. 1362 Died: 1 January 1406
Regnal titles
Preceded by Przemysław I Noszak	Duke of Głogów (1/2); 1404–1406	Succeeded by Przemysław I Noszak
Preceded by Przemysław I Noszak	Duke of Ścinawa (1/2); 1404–1406	Succeeded by Przemysław I Noszak
Preceded by Jan III	Duke of Oświęcim; 1405–1406	Succeeded by Casimir I
