= Nicholas the Small =

- Duke of Ziębice
- Coat-of-arms of Ziębice
- Born: 1322/1327
- Died: 23 April 1358
- Noble family: Silesian Piasts
- Spouse: Agnes Krušina of Lichtenberg
- Issue: Ludmila [Anna?, Elisabeth?] Bolko III of Ziębice; Henry I of Ziębice; Agnes; Guta; Katharina
- Father: Bolko II of Ziębice
- Mother: Bonne or Guta/Judith of Savoy

Nicholas the Small (Mikołaj Mały) (1322/1327 – 23 April 1358) was a Duke of Ziębice from 1341 until his death.

He was the only son of Duke Bolko II of Ziębice and his wife Guta. He was born between 1322 and 1327. He had a sister, Małgorzata, but he did not know whether she was older or younger.

== Life ==
Nicholas received a good education in the Cistercian monastery of Heinrichau (Henryków). After his father's death on 11 June 1341, he took control of the government of his domains. He almost immediately went to Prague, where on 24 August he paid homage to King John of Bohemia. The huge debts left by his father forced Nicholas on 14 October 1343 to promise not to sell any of his lands without John's consent. In addition, if he did sell, the King had the first option to buy. He also agreed that, if the male line of the Dukes of Ziębice became extinct, the duchy would be annexed to the Bohemian Kingdom on condition that appropriate dowries be provided to the late Duke's daughters.

Financial problems as early as 1343 forced Nicholas to sell the district of Zobten (Sobótka) to his cousin Bolko II the Small for 1,000 grzywnas of silver. Three years later, and for the same amount, he sold Frankenstein (Ząbkowice) and the monastery of Kamenz (Kamieniec Ząbkowicki) to the Bohemian magnate Heinrich von Haugwitz. A combination of favorable circumstances enabled him to sell the same land in 1348, this time definitively, to Emperor Charles IV for 6,000 grzywnas. Finally, in 1350 Nicholas sold the town of Wąsów to the Bishop of Breslau, Przecław of Pogorzela. As a result, of the vast domains he inherited from his father, Nicholas retained only Münsterberg, Strehlen (Strzelin), Kanth (Kąty Wrocławskie) and Patschkau (Paczków).

In 1355, Nicholas took part in the coronation of Charles IV as Holy Roman Emperor in Rome. After a long stay in Prague, he returned to his duchy a year later. The Duke then went on a pilgrimage to Palestine between 1357 and 1358.

Nicholas died in Hungary on 23 April 1358 during his return trip. His body was brought to the duchy and buried in the monastery in Heinrichau.

== Marriage and issue ==
By 23 October 1343, Nicholas married Agnes (d. 16 July 1370), daughter of Hynek (also named Hermann or Hajman) Krušina z Lichtemburka, a Bohemian magnate. In some sources, Agnes is erroneously named the daughter of "Herman, Landgrave of Leuchtenberg", who historically never existed. Elisabeth Krušina z Lichtemburk, Agnes' older sister, married Boček z Kunštátu, another Bohemian magnate, and they were the paternal great-grandparents of George of Poděbrady, later King of Bohemia. They had six children:

1. Ludmila [Anna?, Elisabeth?] (b. ca. 1344 – d. ca. 1372), married by 1360 to Duke Siemowit III of Masovia
2. Bolko III (b. ca. 1348 – d. 13 June 1410)
3. Henry I (b. ca. 1350 – d. aft. 8 August 1366)
4. Agnes (b. ca. 1351/53? – d. October 1434), Abbess of St. Klara, Strehlen
5. Guta (b. ca. 1354? – d. 2 September 1413), Abbess of St. Klara, Breslau (bef. 1380)
6. Katharina (b. ca. 1355/58? – d. ca. 1396), a nun in St. Klara, Strehlen.

In his will, Nicholas left to his wife the regency of his lands on behalf of their infant sons and effective rule over Strehlen.

Nicholas the Small House of Piast Born: c. 1327 Died: 23 April 1358
Preceded by Bolko II	Duke of Ziębice; 1341–1358	Succeeded by Bolko III and Henry I
