= Jan III of Oświęcim =

Jan III
- Duke of Oświęcim
- Coat-of-arms of Upper Silesia (Opole, Oświęcim, etc)
- Born: 1366-1376
- Died: by 19 August 1405
- Noble family: Silesian Piasts of Opole
- Spouse: Hedwig of Lithuania
- Father: Jan II of Oświęcim
- Mother: Hedwig of Brzeg

Jan III of Oświęcim (Polish: Jan III oświęcimski) (1366-1376 – by 19 August 1405) was a Duke of Oświęcim since 1376 until his death.

He was the eldest child and only son of Duke Jan II of Oświęcim by his wife Hedwig, daughter of Ludwik I the Fair, Duke of Brzeg. Initially, historians thought that Dukes Jan II and Jan III are the same person, until the discovery of further sources who confirmed Jan III's existence.

== Life ==
Little is known about Jan III's rule. It is possible that, like his grandfather Jan I the Scholastic, he was initially designed to the Church. This is confirmed by a document dated from 1379, where Jan III is called Scholastic of Kraków (although this could be a confusion with Jan I). Another proof of the presumed destination of Jan III to the spiritual career was the agreement in 1372, under which Jan II ensured the inheritance of Oświęcim to Przemysław I Noszak, Duke of Cieszyn on his death.

However, after Jan II's death in 1376, his son could succeed him, but under the guardianship of Przemysław I Noszak. This is confirmed by a document from 25 November 1377 in which the Duke of Cieszyn approves the Oświęcim succession.

Despite his sujetion to the Duchy of Cieszyn, Jan III tried to hold an independent policy. In 1394 he married Hedwig (died aft. 13 May 1400), daughter of Algirdas, Grand Duke of Lithuania and sister of King Władysław II Jagiełło of Poland, which enabled him to improve the relations between Poland and his relative Władysław Opolczyk.

In 1397, together with the other Silesian Dukes and the Bishop of Wrocław, Jan III signed in Legnica an arrangement with the Polish King, to guarantee the common action against robbery. In 1399, Jan III tried to appease the anger of King Władysław II Jagiełło against the Bishop-Duke of Opole Jan Kropidło.

In the internal politics, Jan III promoted and supported the development of the cities (granting privileges, among others, to the districts of Kęty and Zator) and the Church (in particular, like his father and grandfather, to the Dominicans).

The last document in which Jan III appears dated from 1402. However, the historians conclude that Jan III died around three years later. He was buried in the Dominican monastery in Oświęcim.

On his death without issue, Oświęcim was annexed to the Duchy of Cieszyn.

Preceded by Jan II	Duke of Oświęcim; 1376–1405	Succeeded by Przemysław
