= Bolesław of Bytom =

Bolesław
- Duke of Bytom
- Coat-of-arms of Upper Silesia (Cieszyn, Bytom, Strzelce)
- Born: 1330
- Died: c. 4 October 1355
- Noble family: Silesian Piasts of Bytom
- Spouse: Margareta of Sternberg
- Issue: Elisabeth; Euphemia; Bolka
- Father: Władysław of Bytom
- Mother: Ludgarda of Mecklenburg

Bolesław of Bytom (1330 – c. 4 October 1355) was a duke of Koźle from 1347 and Duke of Bytom from 1352 to his death.

He was the second son of Duke Władysław of Bytom but the eldest by his second wife Ludgarda, daughter of Henry II the Lion, Prince of Mecklenburg and Lord of Stargard.

== Life ==
After the death of his elder half-brother Casimir in 1347, Bolesław succeeded him as Duke of Koźle. Five years later, in 1352, the death of his father made him also Duke of Bytom.

In 1354 he went to Italy in the suite of King Charles of Bohemia, who travel to that country for his coronation as Holy Roman Emperor. Under unknown circumstances, Bolesław died suddenly between 4 October and 15 December 1355. He was buried in the cathedral of Venzone in a beautiful tombstone which was destroyed during an earthquake in 1976, but was later restored.

== Marriage and issue ==
By 14 February 1347 Bolesław married Margareta (d. aft. 5 June 1365), daughter of the rich moravian magnate Jaroslav ze Šternberka (of Sternberg). As a dowry, she received the amount of 60 Prague groschen. They had three daughters:

1. Elisabeth (b. 1347/50 – d. 1374), married by 1360 to Duke Przemysław I Noszak of Cieszyn.
2. Euphemia (b. 1350/52 – d. 26 August 1411), married firstly in 1364 to Duke Wenceslaus of Niemodlin and secondly in 1369 to Duke Bolko III of Ziębice.
3. Bolka (b. 1351/55 – d. by 15 October 1428), married in 1360 to Čeněk z Vartemberka (of Wartenberg). A nun after his death in 1396, she became Abbess of Trzebnica in 1405.

With him, the male line of the Bytom-Koźle branch of the Piast dynasty became extinct. According to his will, Bolesław left Bytom to his wife as her dower; however, almost immediately a dispute began over his inheritance between his close relatives, by virtue of the treaty signed between Duke Władysław and the Bohemian Kingdom, who allowed the women succession over his lands in absence of male heirs. The Dukes Konrad I of Oleśnica (husband of Bolesław's eldest half-sister Euphemia) and Casimir I of Cieszyn (legal guardian of Bolesław's daughters) claimed the whole succession of Bolesław, and only solved their dispute in 1357: Koźle (who was already obtain by Konrad I in 1355) remains under the hands of the Dukes of Oleśnica, who also obtained half of Bytom, and the Dukes of Cieszyn received the other half of Bytom, Gliwice, Toszek and Pyskowice.

Bolesław of Bytom House of Piast Born: 1330 Died: 4 October 1355
Regnal titles
Preceded by Casimir	Duke of Koźle; 1347–1355	Succeeded by Konrad I
Preceded by Władysław	Duke of Bytom; 1352–1355	Succeeded by Margareta
