= Bolesław of Cieszyn (died 1356) =

Polish prince

Bolesław
- Provost of the Church of All Saints in Prague
- Coat-of-arms of Upper Silesia (Opole, Cieszyn, etc)
- Born: c. 1331/32
- Died: 23 July 1356; Prague
- Noble family: Silesian Piasts of Opole
- Father: Casimir I, Duke of Cieszyn
- Mother: Euphemia of Masovia-Czersk

Bolesław of Cieszyn (Polish: Bolesław cieszyński; c. 1331/32 – Prague, 23 July 1356), was a Polish prince, member of the Piast dynasty in the Cieszyn branch.

He was the second son of Casimir I, Duke of Cieszyn, by his wife Euphemia, daughter of Duke Trojden I of Czersk-Warsaw.

== Life ==
Like most of Casimir I's children, Bolesław was destined to the cleric since his early years, together with two of his sisters (Jolanta Helena and Elisabeth), and two of his brothers (Jan and Siemowit). The main reason for why Casimir I put three of his five sons to follow a church career was to prevent further division of the already small Duchy of Cieszyn between them after his death. In addition, the Duke of Cieszyn, as a loyal vassal of the Bohemian Kings, hoped to obtain the help of them in obtaining high ecclesiastical dignities for his sons.

In 1345 Bolesław was still a normal priest. Then King John of Bohemia began his efforts to obtain for him the canonry and prebendary of the Cathedrals of both Kraków and Wrocław. As a result, in 1349 Bolesław finally sat in the Kraków Chapter. The son and successor of King John, the future Emperor Charles IV, obtained for him the canonry of Wrocław, and in 1353 appointed him as his personal chaplain, and with this, the position of Provost of the Church of All Saints on the Royal Castle in Prague. Bolesław's place of burial is unknown.
