= Bolko I the Strict =

Polish duke (1252/56–1301)

- Duke of Lwówek, Jawor, Świdnica, Ziębice
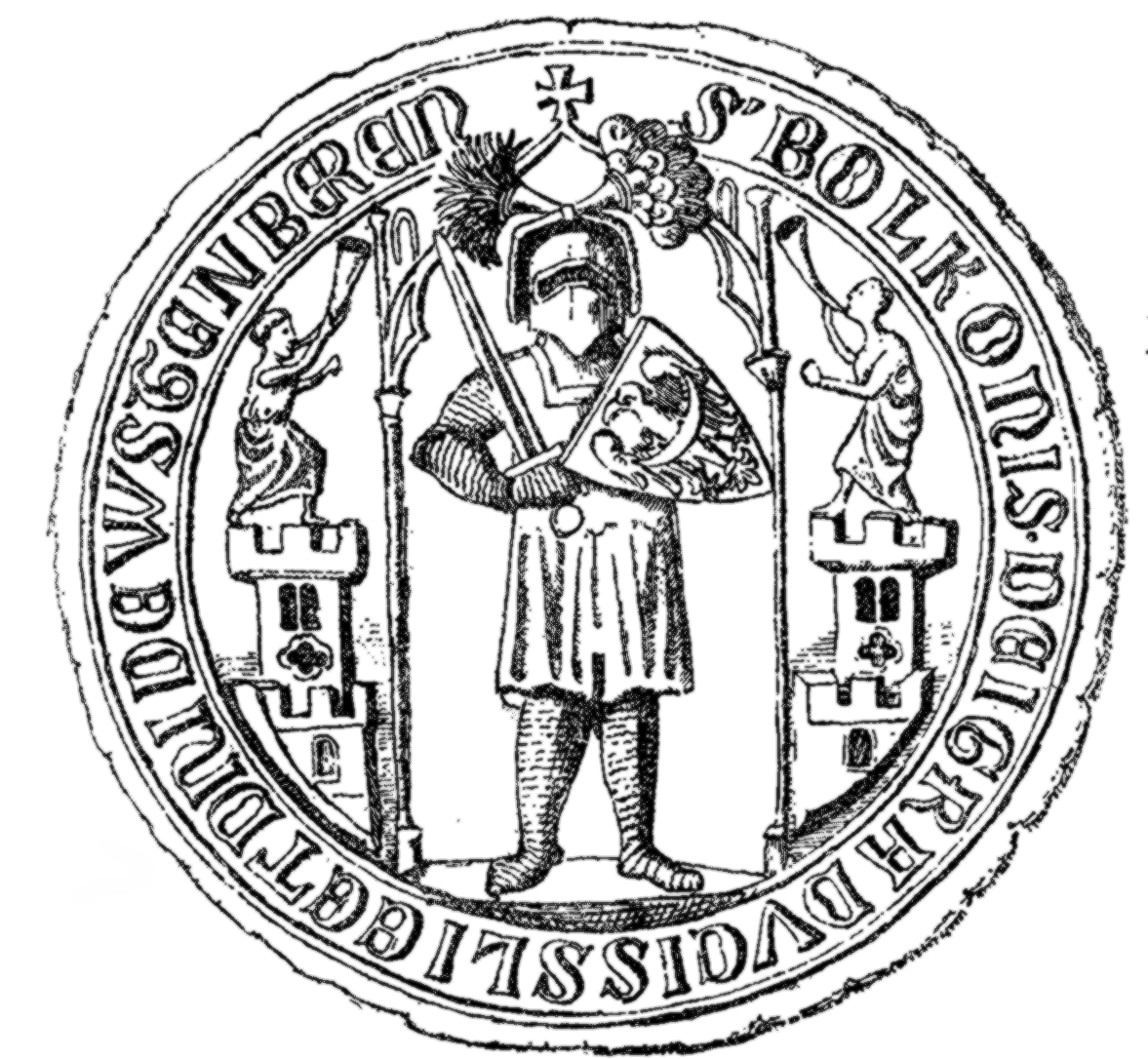
- Bolko I's seal, dated to 1298
- Born: between 1252 and 1256
- Died: 9 November 1301
- Buried: Krzeszów Abbey
- Noble family: Silesian Piasts
- Spouse: Beatrice of Brandenburg
- Issue: Judith; Bolko; Beatrice; Bernard; Henry I Elisabeth; Margareta; Bolko II; Anna
- Father: Bolesław II the Bald
- Mother: Hedwig of Anhalt

Bolko I the Strict (Polish: Bolko I Surowy or Srogi or Jaworski; 1252/56 – 9 November 1301), was Duke of Lwówek 1278–81 (with his brother as co-ruler) and of Jawor after 1278 (with his brother as co-ruler until 1281) as well as the sole Duke of Lwówek after 1286, and Duke of Świdnica-Ziębice from 1291.

== Life ==
Bolko I was the second son of Bolesław II the Bald, Duke of Legnica by his first wife Hedwig, daughter of Henry I, Count of Anhalt.

Most likely because he was still too young to actively participate in politics, Bolko appears rarely in the chronicles before his father's death. It is possible that he took part in the victorious Battle of Stolec in 1277.

Bolesław II died on 26 December 1278. Bolko I and his younger brother Bernard the Lightsome inherited Jawor and Lwówek as co-rulers, and their older brother Henry V the Fat retained Legnica. In 1281 Bolko I and Bernard divided their domains: Bernard kept Lwówek, and Bolko I became in sole ruler of Jawor.

One of the first tasks of Bolko I as sole ruler was to protect his modest inheritance from the growing power of Henry IV Probus, Duke of Wrocław. To that end, he decided to enter into an alliance with the Margraves of Brandenburg. In order to cement this alliance, a marriage was arranged between Bolko I and Beatrice, the daughter of Margrave Otto V the Tall of Brandenburg. The betrothal was performed in the city of Spandau on 19 April 1279; however, because of the close relationship between groom and bride, the formal wedding was performed more than five years later, in 1284 (although the Papal dispensation to allow the wedding was announced only one year later, in 1285). Bolko I's relation to the House of Ascania engaged him in an armed conflict with the German King Rudolf I of Habsburg and Henry IV Probus. An expedition made on Wrocław in 1280 and on Prague in the following year, instead of expected successes, brought him a retaliatory action from the Duke of Wroclaw.

After the death of his brother Bernard in 1286 without issue, Bolko I inherited the Duchy of Lwówek, by virtue of a reciprocal inheritance treaty signed by the brothers around 1281.

In the second half of the 1280s, Bolko I tried to avoid the dangers from the rising power of Henry IV Probus and began to approach the King Wenceslaus II of Bohemia. On several occasions, he travelled to Prague and took part in many court ceremonies, for example in 1289, when Bolko I took part in the homage of Duke Casimir of Bytom to King Wenceslaus II. However, despite the fact that Bolko I strongly resisted the complete dominance of Prague, he received minor benefits from the Kingdom of Bohemia, such as the possession of the strategical castle in Chełmsko Śląskie on the Bohemian frontier.

The unexpected death of Henry IV Probus in 1290 caused a complete change in Silesian politics. Bolko I's brother Henry V the Fat occupied Wroclaw and took control of all of Henry IV's domains, but had to face the opposition of the Wroclaw nobility and the pretensions of the rightful heir of Henry IV, Duke Henry III of Głogów. Bolko I decided to give his brother assistance; however, the price for it was quite high. Only after Henry V gave him the towns of Świdnica, Ząbkowice, Ziębice, and Strzelin, Bolko I sent troops and food to Wrocław and Legnica. The help for Henry V, however, was inadequate; at the end, Henry V was defeated and imprisoned in an iron cage by Henry III. Named regent of Henry V's domains during his absence, Bolko I never attempted to obtain the release of his brother.

The 1290s were also a period of difficult relations with the neighboring Kingdom of Bohemia. It is unknown why relations between them altered, but this could be probably thanks to the willingness of the Duke of Jawor-Świdnica. Bolko I, in order to secure his domains, began the intensive building of fortifications in his Duchy (particularly in the Bohemian frontier towns of Świdnica, Wleń, Strzegom and Kamienna Góra). After this, Bolko I tried to take full control over the Duchy of Nysa-Otmuchów, given to the Bishopric of Wroclaw in Henry IV's will.

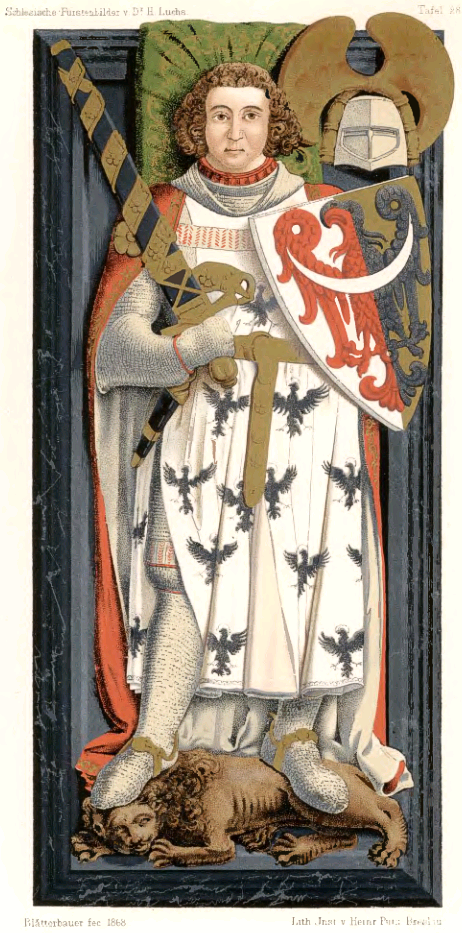
Bolko I's tomb effigy in Krzeszów. In this 19th-century lithograph an attempt was made to reconstruct the medieval polychrome.

Resentful of Bolko I's ambitions, Bishop Jan Romka decided to use the biggest weapons available to him against the Duke: in 1294 Bolko I was excommunicated, and all his lands were placed under interdict. Forced by this actions, Bolko I renounced his pretensions and freed the Bishop's castles that he had occupied.

The tensions between Bolko I and King Wenceslas II finally erupted in 1295 and war began. The Bohemian King did not expect a significant resistance; however, to his great surprise, he had to watch the effective defense of the Duke of Jawor. In the war with Bohemia, Bolko I could use the fortifications built by him (the Bohemian army was stopped at Kamienna Góra). Bolko I also demonstrated that he was a wise politician; immediately after stopping the Bohemian troops, he put his domains under the protection of Pope Boniface VIII, which eventually led King Wenceslaus II to seek a settlement. The peace was signed most likely at the beginning of 1297, since on 2 June of that year Bolko I was present at the coronation of King Wenceslaus II in Prague.

At the beginning of 1296 Henry V the Fat died, leaving three minor sons. As the closest male relative, the guardianship of Henry V's children and the regency of his domains were given to Bolko I. In this situation Bolko I tried to extract all the benefits he could and took for himself Sobótka castle. Bolko I's regency had to face several difficulties: first, the resistance of the powerful Wrocław nobility, who feared that the well-known Bolko I's hard rule could affect their privileges. Soon, Henry III of Głogów decided to exploit the difficulties of the Duke of Jawor and began a war against him. However, in this instance, Bolko I achieved a complete success, not only because he managed to repel the invasion of the Duke of Głogów, but additionally he managed to take the castles of Chojnów and Bolesławiec.

Bolko I was energetic in developing his lands and building castles. Although a Slavic Piast by origin, he encouraged colonization of his lands by German settlers and a patron of the Cistercian movement, notably founding the Cistercian Krzeszów Abbey.

Bolko I was known a patron of literature. An 8000 line poem in Middle High German on the exploits of Ludwig III, Count of Thuringia, was composed by an unnamed priest at Bolko's instigation.

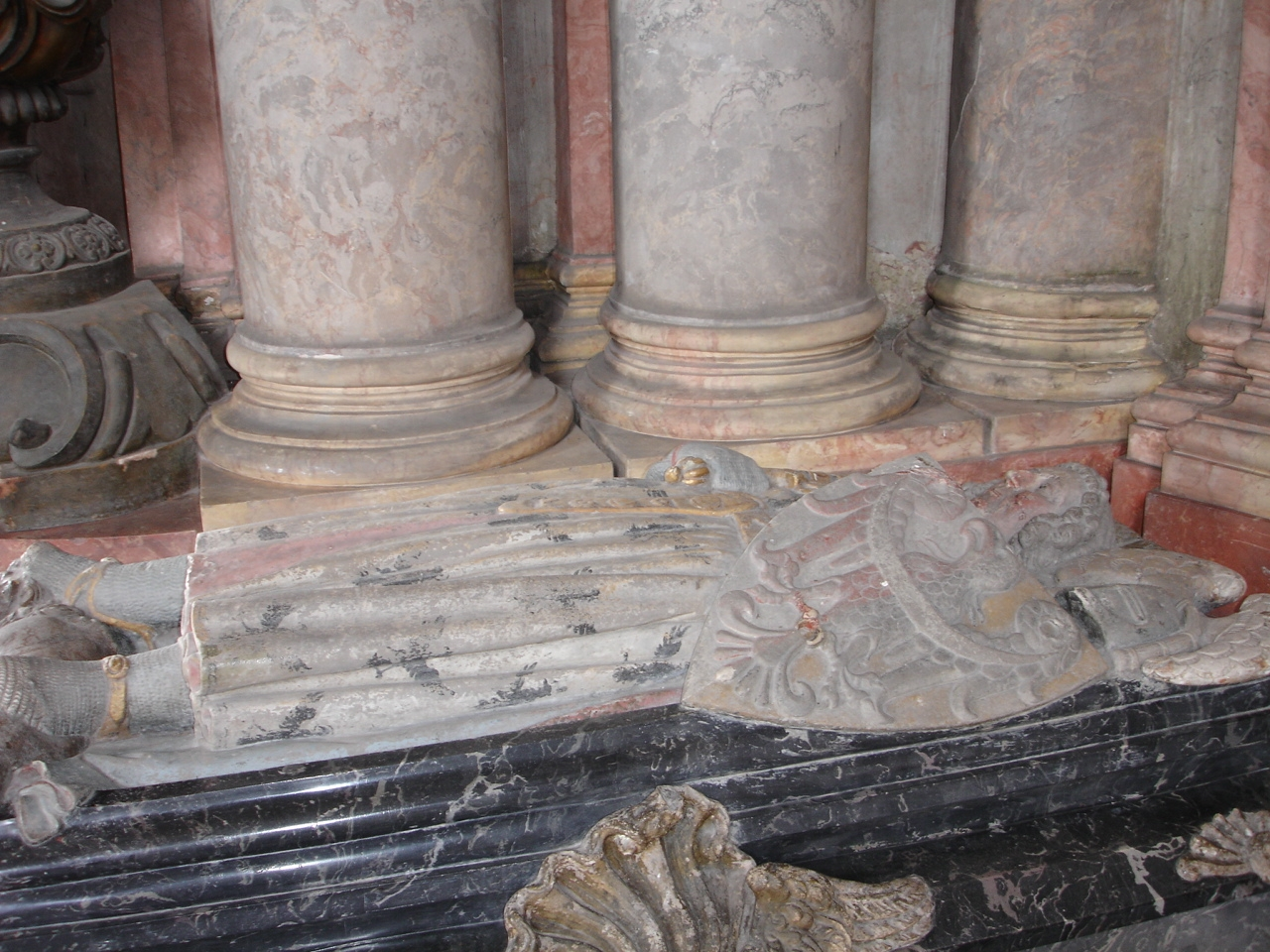
Funeral effigy of Bolko in Krzeszów Abbey

To resolve the tense situation in Upper Silesia, by March 1297 an annual congress of Silesian Dukes in Zwanowicach was convened, where Bolko I made the final settlement with Henry III. Bolko I spent the last years of his life strengthening his position as the most powerful of the Silesian princes, which he achieved after his recognition as a Papal vassal on 21 March 1299.

Bolko I died suddenly on 9 November 1301 and was buried in Krzeszów Abbey. He was succeeded by his sons, but because they were minors at that time, his brother-in-law Herman, Margrave of Brandenburg-Salzwedel assumed the regency of his domains and the guardianship of his children. The custody of Henry V's sons and the regency of his lands was taken by King Wenceslaus II.

== Marriage and issue ==
In Berlin on 4 October 1284, Bolko I married Beatrice (b. ca. 1270 – d. bef. 26 April 1316), daughter of Otto V "the Tall", Margrave of Brandenburg-Salzwedel. They had:

1. Judith (b. ca. 1287 – d. Landshut, 15 September 1320), married in 1299 to Stephen I, Duke of Lower Bavaria.
2. Bolko (b. ca. 1288 – d. 30 January 1300).
3. Beatrice (b. 1290 – d. Munich, 25 August 1322), married by 14 October 1308 to Louis IV, Duke of Upper Bavaria, later German King and Holy Roman Emperor.
4. Bernard (b. ca. 1291 – d. 6 May 1326).
5. Henry I (b. 1292/96 – d. bef. 15 May 1346).
6. Elisabeth (b. and d. 1300).
7. Margareta (b. and d. 1300) [twin of Elisabeth?].
8. Bolko II (b. 1 February 1300 – d. 11 June 1341).
9. A son (b. ca. early 1301 – 24 December 1307).
10. Anna (b. posthumously, 21 November 1301 – d. bef. 24 June 1334), Abbess of St. Clara, Strehlen (1327).

== Notes ==
Bolko I the Strict House of Piast Born: between 1252 and 1256 Died: 9 November 1301
Preceded by Henry V the Fat	Duke of Lwówek with Bernard; 1278–1281	Succeeded by Bernard the Lightsome
Preceded by Henry V the Fat	Duke of Jawor with Bernard (until 1281); 1278–1301	Succeeded by Bernard; Henry I Bolko II
Preceded by Bernard the Lightsome	Duke of Lwówek; 1286–1301	Succeeded by Bernard; Henry I Bolko II
Preceded by Henry V the Fat	Duke of Ziębice; 1291–1301	Succeeded by Bernard; Henry I Bolko II
Preceded by Henry V the Fat	Duke of Świdnica; 1291–1301	Succeeded by Bernard; Henry I Bolko II
