= Casimir of Koźle =

Duke of Koźle

Casimir
- Duke of Koźle
- Coat-of-arms of Upper Silesia (Cieszyn, Bytom, Strzelce)
- Born: c. 1312
- Died: by 2 March 1347
- Noble family: Silesian Piasts of Bytom
- Father: Władysław of Bytom
- Mother: Beatrice of Brandenburg

Casimir of Koźle (Polish: Kazimierz kozielski; c. 1312 – by 2 March 1347) was a Duke of Koźle from 1336 until his death.

He was the eldest son of Duke Władysław of Bytom the only one by his first wife Beatrix, daughter of Otto V the Long, Margrave of Brandenburg–Salzwedel. Casimir was born between 1309 and 1316, probably c. 1312.

== Life ==
There is little known about Casimir's life. In 1336, after the death of Duke Leszek of Racibórz, the town of Koźle returned to Bytom according to the terms of the pledge made four years before; however, Duke Władysław was forced to immediately give the district to his firstborn son, Casimir.

About the rule of Casimir over Koźle, almost nothing is known. The only certainty is, because of his prodigality and huge debts, he stopped paying Peter's Pence, and in consequence he was excommunicated by the Church.

Casimir never married or had children. He was certainly dead before 2 March 1347 and it is unknown where he was buried.

Regnal titles
Preceded by Leszek	Duke of Koźle; 1336–1347	Succeeded by Bolesław
