= Bolko II of Ziębice =

Polish noble (1300–1341)

Bolko II
- Duke of Ziębice
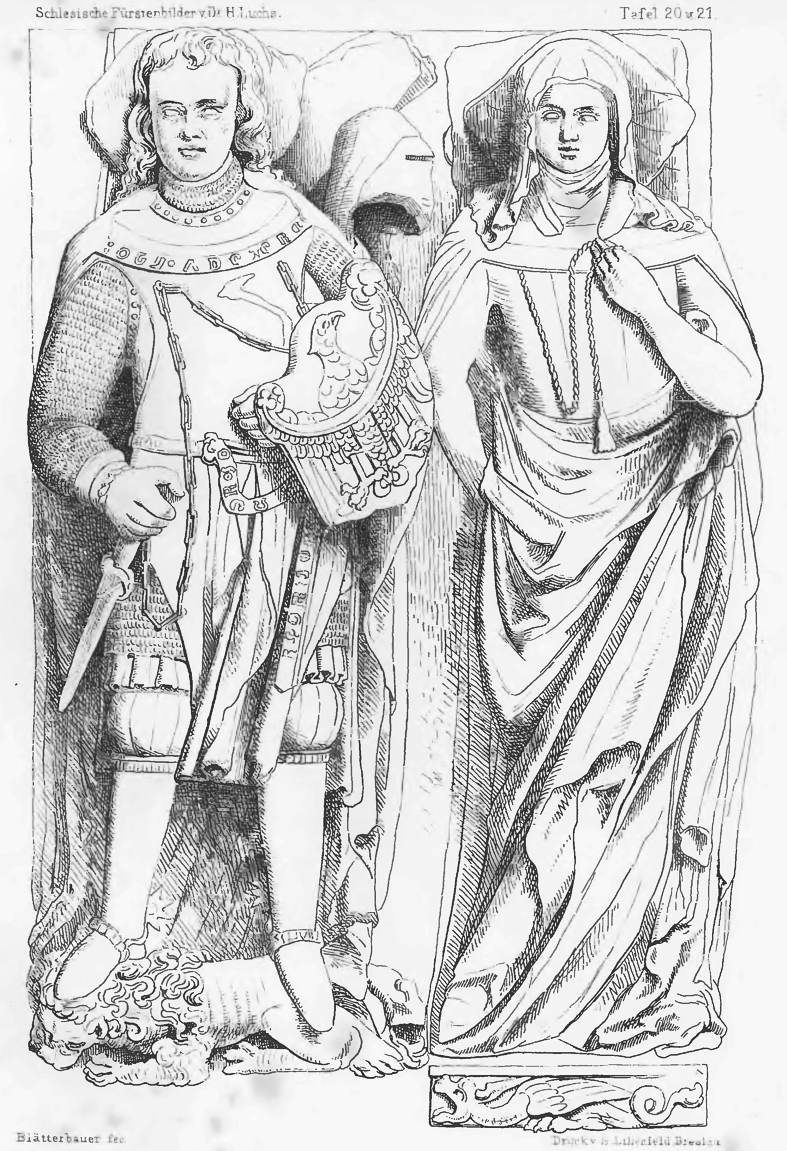
- Tomb of Bolko II and his wife Bonne "Guta" in Henryków.
- Dukedom: 1301 – 11 June 1341
- Full name: Bolko von Jauer
- Other titles: Duke of Świdnica (1301–1322); Duke of Jawor and Lwówek (1301–1312)
- Born: 1 February 1300
- Died: 11 June 1341 (aged 41); Ziębice, Poland
- Buried: Henryków, Poland
- Family: Silesian Piasts
- Wife: Bonne de Savoie (m. 1342)
- Issue: Margareta; Nicholas the Small
- Father: Bolko I the Strict
- Mother: Beatrice of Brandenburg

Bolko II of Ziębice (Polish: Bolko II Ziębicki; 1 February 1300 – 11 June 1341) was a Duke of Jawor-Lwówek-Świdnica-Ziębice in Poland from 1301 to 1312 (with his brothers as co-rulers), of Świdnica-Ziębice from 1312 to 1322 (with his brother as co-ruler), and sole Duke of Ziębice from 1322 until his death.

He was the fourth son of Bolko I the Strict, Duke of Jawor-Lwówek-Świdnica-Ziębice, by his wife Beatrix, daughter of Otto V the Long, Margrave of Brandenburg-Salzwedel. He was named after his eldest brother Bolko, who died on 30 January 1300, just two days before his birth.

== Life ==
At the time of his father's death in 1301, Bolko II was not quite two years old. Therefore, he and his siblings were placed under the care of their mother and the guardianship of their maternal uncle, Herman, Margrave of Brandenburg-Salzwedel, until 1305, when the eldest living brother Bernard assumed the government and the tutelage of his brothers. Out of fear that the duchy would be fragmented, Bolko II was initially destined for a career in the Church. Bolko II strongly resisted these plans, and in 1322 received the district of Ziębice as an independent duchy from Bernard.

In 1322, Bolko II, alongside Bernard, took part with Teutonic Knights in the expedition against Lithuania.

On the threshold of his reign, Bolko II fell into conflict with the Church. The continued financial difficulties of the Duke lead him to invade and steal goods from the monasteries of Henryków and Kamieniec Ząbkowicki. In 1329, the Duke attacked the suite of the Papal legate Pietro di Alverni. This action motivated the intervention of the Kings of Poland and Bohemia, with the support of almost all of the Silesian dukes. Defeated, Bolko II was excommunicated by the Bishop of Wrocław, Nanker. The excommunication was only removed after Bolko II paid large sums to both the Papal legate and the monasteries as compensation.

In 1335, the Duchy of Ziębice was attacked by Charles of Luxembourg, Margrave of Moravia and heir of the Bohemian Kingdom, because Bolko II refused to pay homage for his duchy. It was the shortest route between Prague and the most important Silesian city, Wrocław, at that time under the control of the Bohemian Kingdom. Charles ignored Bolko II's determination, and sent a small force against him. The Duke quickly defeated the force, capturing 150 of the major Bohemian knights, but he failed to halt the destruction of the Bohemian lands made by Charles's army. Bolko II was able to take advantage from the captivity of the Bohemian knights; however, he only asked a very small ransom for them. Bolko II won the 1335 war.

However, in June 1336, Bolko II voluntary paid homage to the King of Bohemia. The withdrawal of the Silesian Dukes by King Casimir III the Great of Poland eliminated Bolko II's hope of building an effective power against the Bohemian Kingdom. Also, Bolko II received the Kłodzko Land during his lifetime. Bolko II's act of homage confirmed that, after the eventual extinction of the male line of the Dukes of Ziębice, the Duchy would fall under the direct rule of the King of Bohemia.

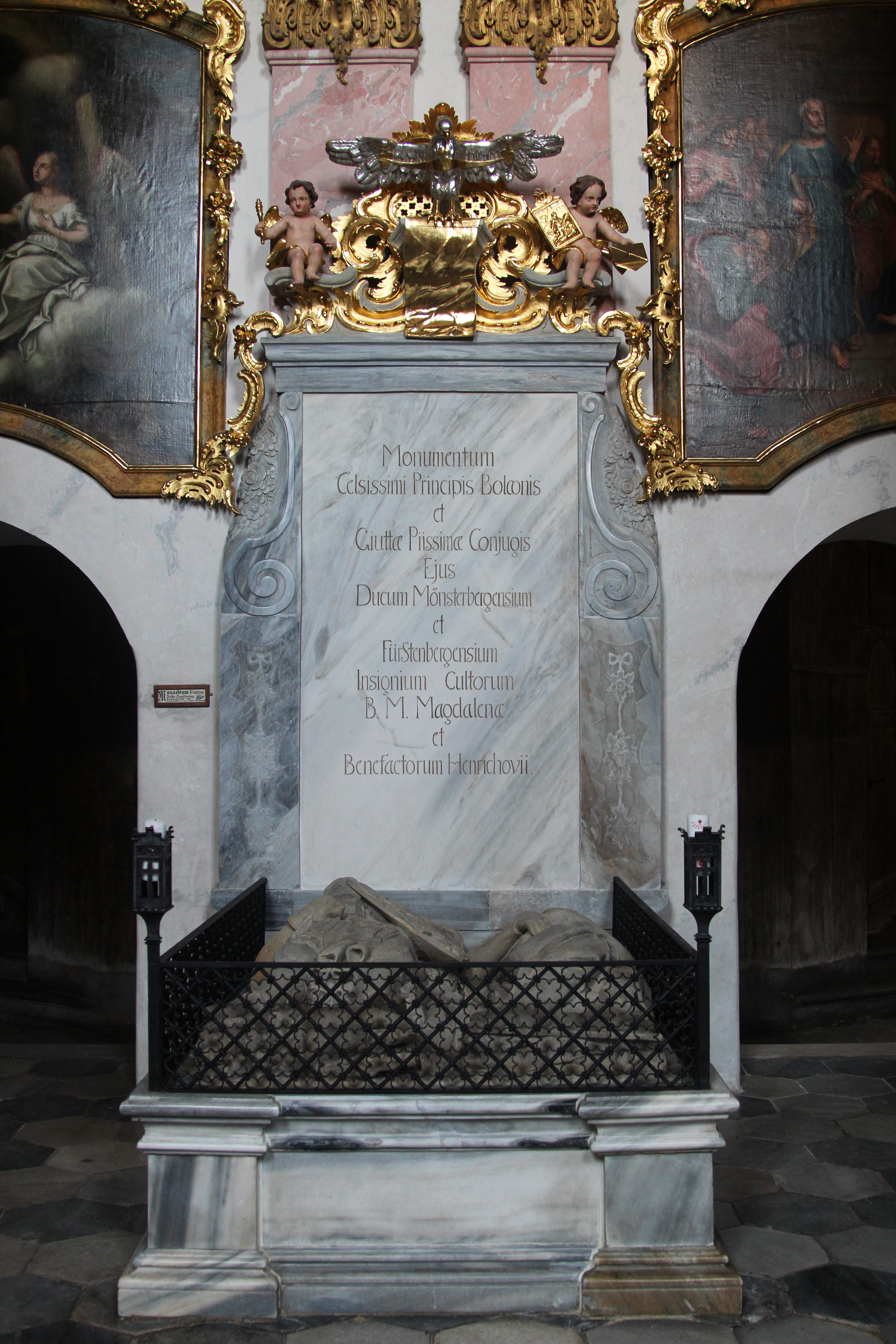
Tomb in Henryków

Bolko II struggled with his continuing financial problems, increased by his prodigality. In 1337, he was forced to pledge Ząbkowice to Charles of Luxembourg, and shortly after, for the amount of 2,300 fines he pledged Strzelin and Kąty Wrocławskie. At the end, Bolko II only retained the capital of the Duchy, Ziębice. Despite this, Bolko II cared about the economic development of his estate, which enjoyed a relatively high popularity among the Silesian cities.

Bolko II died on 11 June 1341 in Ziębice, and was buried in the Henryków.

== Marriage and issue ==
By 21 November 1321, Bolko II married Bonne de Savoie (also named Guta or Judith), daughter (either legitimate) or illegitimate of Louis II of Savoy, Baron of Vaud. Bonne was the widow of Matthew IV Csák, a Hungarian nobleman (son of the infamous oligarch Matthew III Csák) and also mother of two sons, Matthew V and James. Bolko II and Guta had two children:

1. Nicholas the Small (b. c. 1327 – d. 23 April 1358).
2. Margareta (b. c. 1330 – d. August aft. 1368), a nun in Strzelin.

== Ancestry ==
Ancestors of Bolko II of Ziębice

16. Henry I the Bearded
8. Henry II the Pious
17. Hedwig of Silesia
4. Bolesław II the Bald
18. Ottakar I of Bohemia
9. Anne of Bohemia
19. Constance of Hungary
2. Bolko I the Strict
20. Bernhard, Count of Anhalt
10. Henry I, Count of Anhalt
21. Jutta of Poland
5. Hedwig of Anhalt
22. Hermann I, Landgrave of Thuringia
11. Irmgard of Thuringia
23. Sophia of Wittelsbach
1. Bolko II of Ziębice
24. Albert II, Margrave of Brandenburg
12. Otto III, Margrave of Brandenburg
25. Matilda of Lusatia
6. Otto V, Margrave of Brandenburg-Salzwedel
26.Wenceslaus I of Bohemia
13. Beatrice of Bohemia
27. Kunigunde of Hohenstaufen
3. Beatrice of Brandenburg
28. Poppo VII, Count of Henneberg
14. Herman I, Count of Henneberg
29. Jutta of Thuringia
7. Judith of Henneberg
30. Floris IV, Count of Holland
15. Margaret of Holland
31. Matilda of Brabant

Preceded by Bolko I the Strict	Duke of Świdnica with Bernard and Henry I (until 1312); 1301–1322	Succeeded by Bernard
Preceded by Bolko I the Strict	Duke of Jawor with Bernard and Henry I 1301–1312	Succeeded by Henry I
Preceded by Bolko I the Strict	Duke of Lwówek with Bernard and Henry I 1301–1312	Succeeded by Henry I
Preceded by Bolko I the Strict	Duke of Ziębice with Bernard (until 1322) and Henry I (until 1312); 1301–1341	Succeeded by Nicholas the Small
