= Toszek =

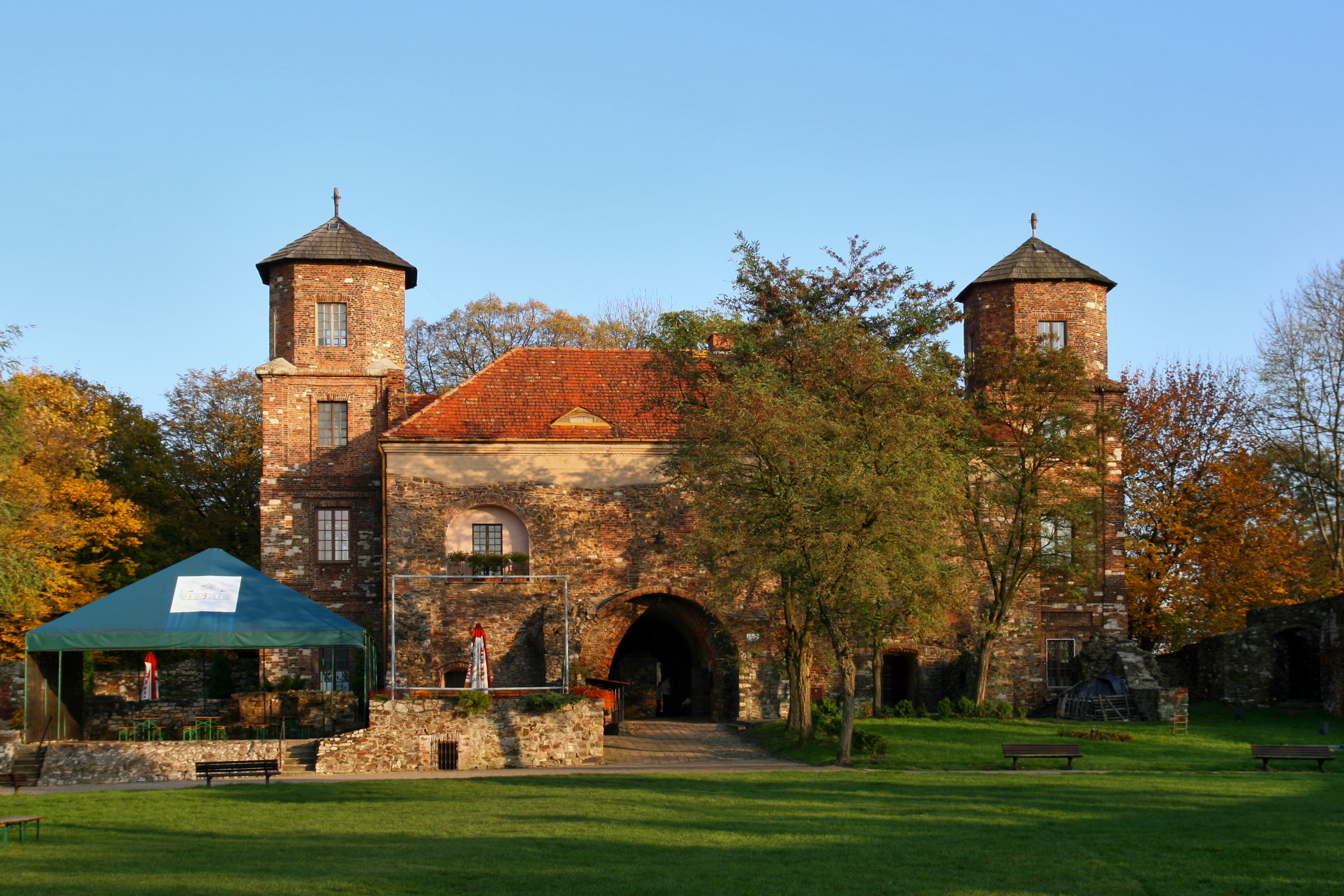
- Toszek Castle

- Coat of arms

- Location within Poland
- Coordinates: 50°27′N 18°31′E
- Country: Poland
- Voivodeship: Silesian
- County: Gliwice
- Gmina: Toszek
- Town rights: about 1235

Government
  - Mayor: Grzegorz Kupczyk

Area
  - Total: 9.67 km^{2} (3.73 sq mi)

Population (2019-06-30)
  - Total: 3,600
  - Density: 370/km^{2} (960/sq mi)
- Time zone: UTC+1 (CET)
  - Summer (DST): UTC+2 (CEST)
- Postal code: 44-180
- Car plates: SGL
- Climate: Cfb
- Website: http://www.toszek.pl/

Toszek [ˈtɔʂɛk] (German: Tost) is a town in southern Poland. It is situated within Gliwice County in the Silesian Voivodeship (province), and its population was estimated at 3,600 inhabitants in 2019. It is situated on the Toszecki Potok River, a tributary of Kłodnica.

== History ==
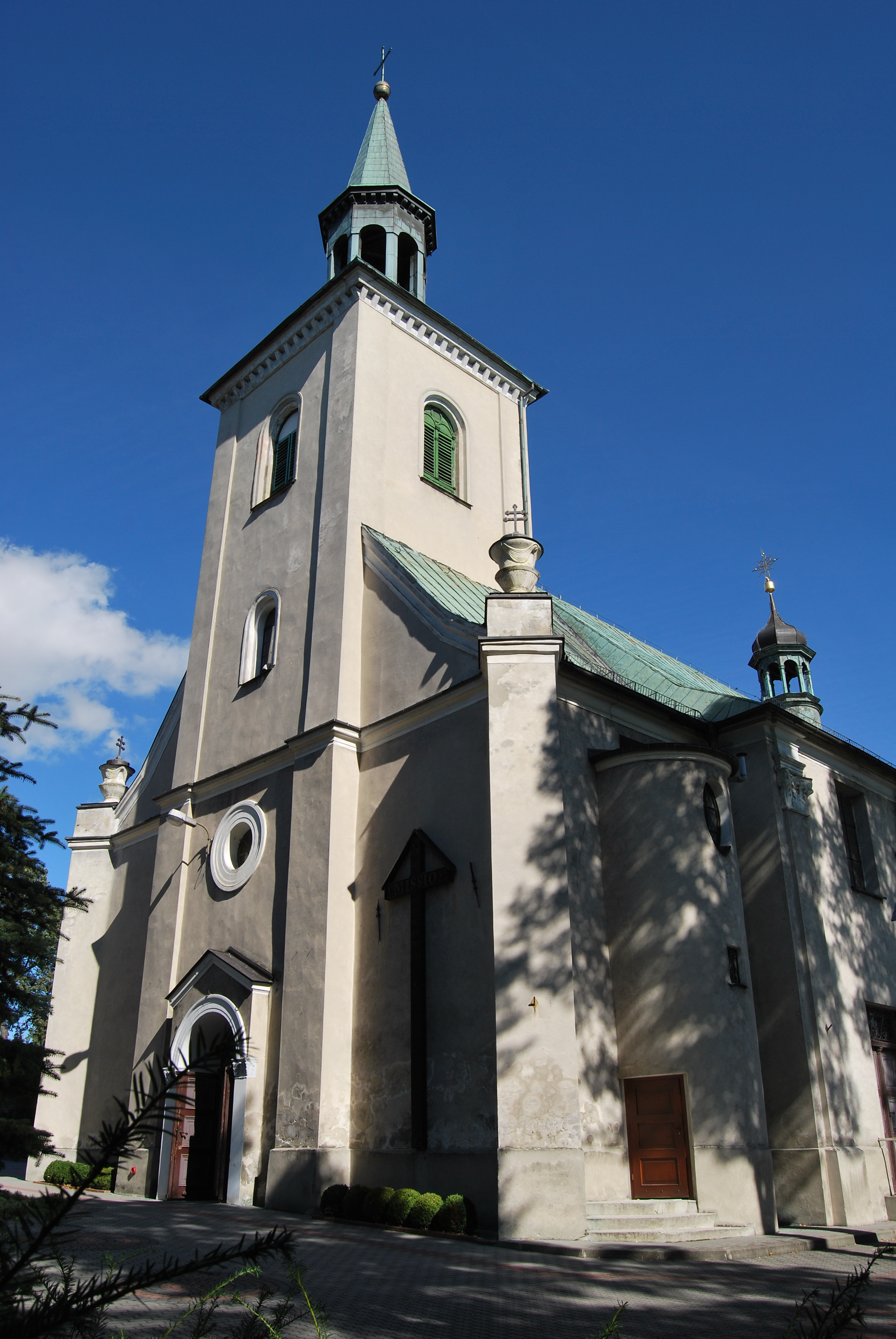
Church of Saint Catherine

The beginning of the settlement and fortified keep dates back to the 9th and 10th centuries when the area was ruled by the Piasts, Mieszko I of Poland and later Bolesław I the Brave. The fortified keep had grown to the size of a town during the rule of Duke of Wrocław Bolesław I the Tall and during his rule it received town rights in 1235. After 1281 it became the seat of the regional Duchy and title of local ruler Bolesław was "the enlightened Bolesław, Duke of Toszek". In the 14th century the original Polish settlement passed to the Crown of Bohemia. In 1536, the city received Magdeburg rights from King Ferdinand I of Bohemia.

In 1593 Rudolf II sold the castle and the area to Freiherr von Redern auf Groß Strehlitz. Under Habsburg rule, like many other areas in Silesia, the Toszek area was subjected to Germanisation, however a large portion of the population remained Polish. In 1645, along with the Duchy of Opole, Toszek returned to Polish rule under the House of Vasa. Toszek (Tost) burned down on 18 August 1677, and was looted in 1807. From 1742, the town belonged to Prussia and from 1871 was also part of Germany. From 1791 to 1797 it was owned by Joseph von Eichendorff. Administratively, it was part of the Tost-Gleiwitz district in the Province of Silesia. It became part of the Province of Upper Silesia in 1919, close to the Polish border. According to the German census of 1871, the town had a population of 1,775, of which 900 (50.7%) were Poles. On 20 March 1921, the Upper Silesia plebiscite was held in which a majority of inhabitants voted to remain in Germany rather than rejoin Poland, which just regained independence following World War I (1348 or 86% vs. 217 or 13.8%, at 97.4% turnout). Local Polish activists were intensively persecuted since 1937. During Kristallnacht, the Jews of Toszek were sent by the Germans to concentration camps, where later they were all murdered.

During the Second World War, the civilian internment camp IIag VIII was situated in the city. English civilians, interned in the Camp Schoorl (Netherlands), were transferred to Tost on 3 September 1940. The writer P.G. Wodehouse was among the British internees: he is recorded as having commented on the region, "If this is Upper Silesia, one wonders what Lower Silesia must be like...". From November 1943 to November 1944, the German Nazi government operated the Oflag 6 prisoner-of-war camp for French officers. The Germans also operated the E478 forced labour subcamp of the Stalag VIII-B/344 POW camp in the town. After the war, a Soviet NKVD camp was established in the town where between June–December 1945 about 3,000 incarcerated people died. About 1,000 prisoners were from Silesia including Wrocław, but from July 1945 the NKVD brought in thousands more prisoners from the Bautzen area of Saxony. Sybille Krägel from Saxony, whose father died in the Tost prison, and others, traced the prisoner lists and over 4,500 are identified by now with 800 more yet unidentified. A memorial to NKVD victims is placed in Toszek.

Following the 1945 Potsdam Agreement the town once more became part of Poland.

== Transport ==
There is a train station in Toszek. The Polish National road 94 and Voivodeship road 907 pass through Toszek, and the A4 motorway runs nearby, south of the town.

== Notable people ==
- Ludwig Guttmann (1899–1980), German-British neurologist
