= Duchy of Löwenberg =

Silesian duchy (1281–1286)

Duchy of Lwówek/Löwenberg Księstwo Lwóweckie (pl) Herzogtum Löwenberg (de)
- 1281–1286
- Coat of arms

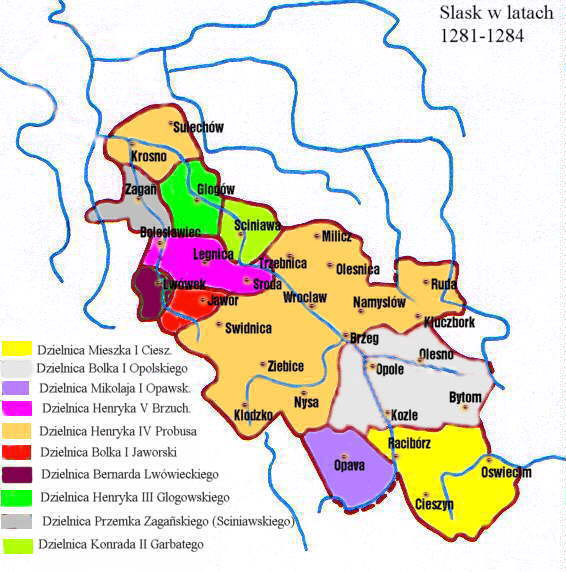
- Silesia in 1284: Lwowek Duchy in burgundy
- Status: District duchy of Poland
- Capital: Lwówek Śląski
- Religion: Roman Catholic
- Duke
  - 1281–1286: Bernard the Lightsome
- Historical era: Middle Ages
  - Partitioned from Jawor: 1281
  - Annexed by Jawor: 1286
Preceded by	Succeeded by
Duchy of Jawor	Duchy of Jawor
- Today part of: Poland

The Duchy of Löwenberg (German: Herzogtum Löwenberg) or Duchy of Lwówek (Polish: Księstwo Lwóweckie) was one of the Duchies of Silesia and medieval Poland established in 1281 as a division of the Duchy of Jawor. The duchy of Lwówek was ruled by the Silesian Piast, Bernard the Lightsome, with its capital at Lwówek Śląski in Lower Silesia. It was the southwesternmost duchy of Poland at the time.

== Geography ==
The original duchy was located in the south-western part of Lower Silesia on the current lands of Lwówek County with the southern part of the duchy covering most of the modern Karkonosze County. Lwówek Śląski was the biggest town (around 11.000 inhabitants.) and also the capital of the duchy. The town of Lwowek had its own mint and coin. The town had double walls and two big churches. Some other important towns located within the lands of the duchy were: Wleń, Gryfów Śląski (German: Greiffenberg) and Jelenia Góra (Hirschberg). The main factor of the rapid development of the area was gold surrounding Lwowek Slaski and the trade road Via Regia. Some sources say that a few tons of gold were excavated in the Middle Ages from the mines around Lwowek. After the exhaustion of the gold mines the citizens started to earn from cloth producing, weaving, crafts, trade and sandstone processing.

== History ==
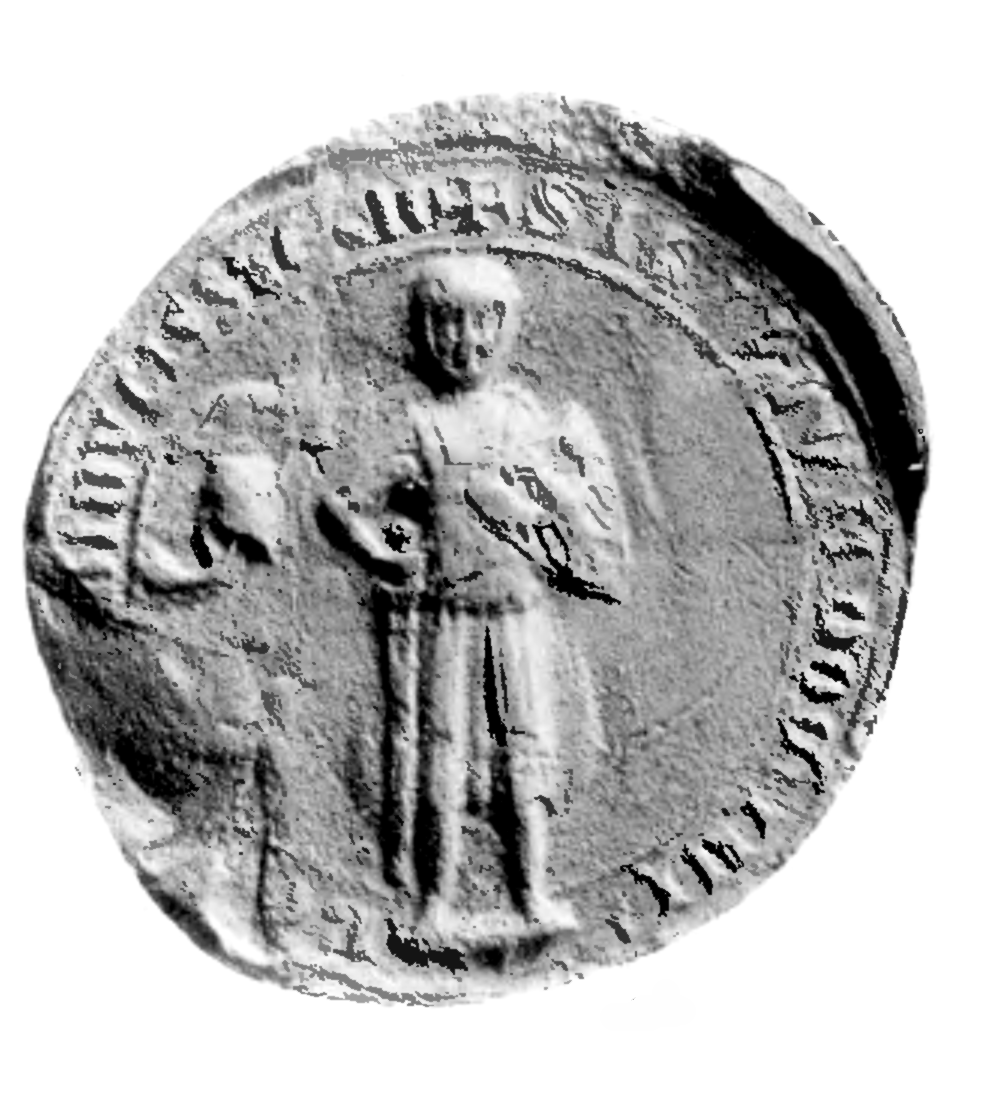
Seal of Bernard the Lightsome

Bernard the Lightsome was the only ruler of the duchy of Lwowek. He was the youngest son of the Silesian prince Boleslaw II Rogatka and Hedwig, daughter of Henry I, Count of Anhalt. He became the ruler 3 years after his father died, in 1281 when Bernard's brother Bolko I the Strict partitioned the Duchy of Jawor and granted him western part of the duchy with its capital in Lwówek Śląski. The Duchy of Jawor and the duchy of Lwówek cooperated as brothers ruled in the two duchies. Bernard died unmarried and childless in 1286 and because of a lack of heirs the duchy of Lwówek was annexed and ruled by the Duchy of Jawor again by Bernard's brother Bolko I.

== Castles ==
There were several castles guarding the lands of the duchy. The most important were those located in Wleń, Gryfów and Lwówek.

Lwówek Castle (Polish: Zamek książęcy w Lwówku Śląskim) was a medieval castle in Lwówek built to protect the inhabitants of the town. It was built at the beginning of the 13th century as a seat of Silesian princes. It was located in the southern part of the town, along the town walls. The founder of the castle was probably Henry I the Bearded. The castle was often visited by princes of Jawor and Swidnica-Jawor (for example Bolko I the Strict). The castle was partly destroyed during a fire in 1381 but the town council decided to rebuild the castle and in 1389 the renovation was complete. Since 1444 the castle was no longer a public property. The castle was destroyed again in 1475 after a huge fire and has never been rebuilt again. Now in the place of the castle stands the oldest brewery in Poland which started producing beer in 1209. The only remains of the castle are the sandstone foundations in the brewery's basement.

Gryf Castle is located in Proszowka near Gryfow. The first owner of the castle was Konrad II the Hunchback.

Wleń Castle is located in Łupki near Wleń.

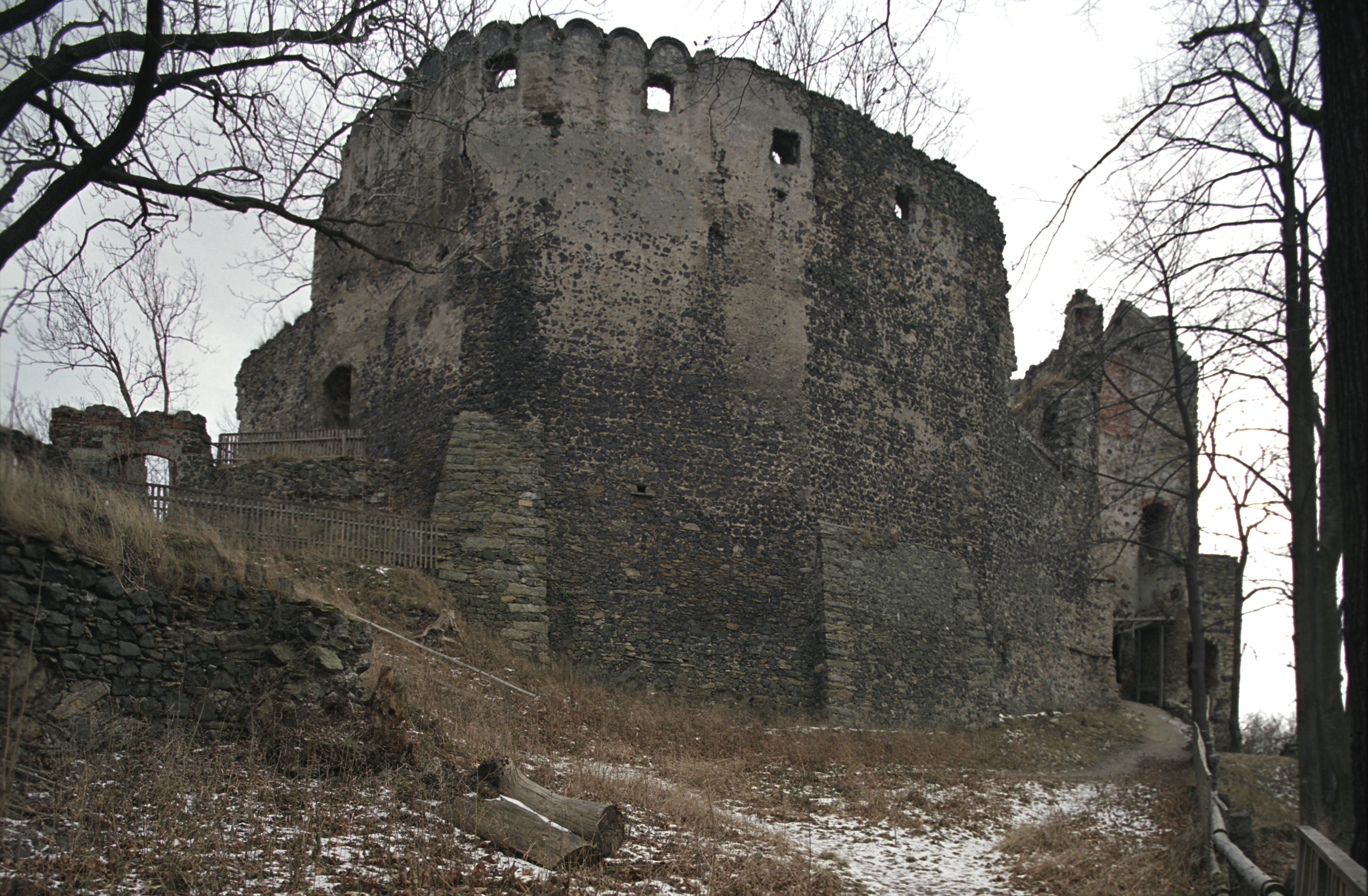
Remainings of the Gryf Castle

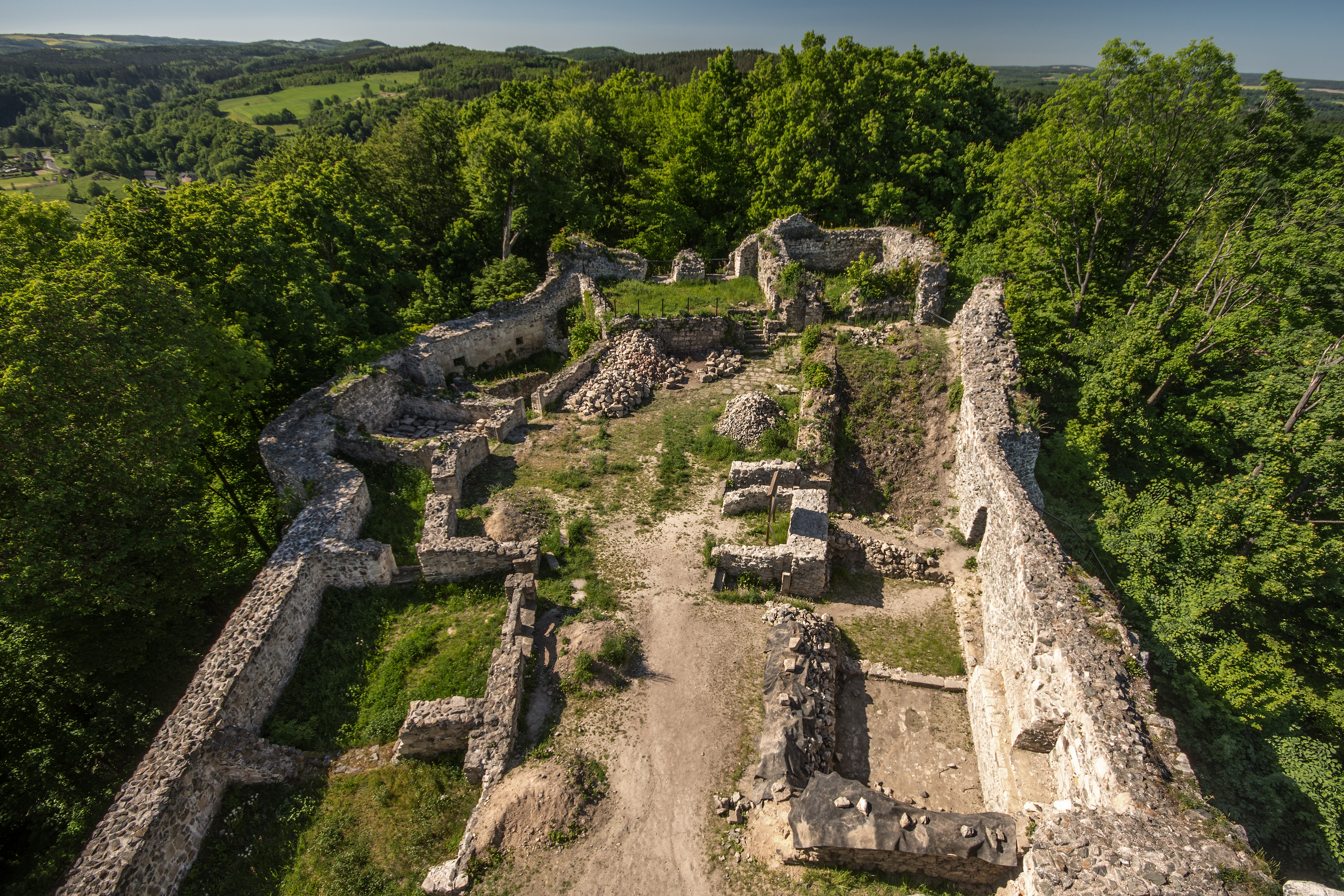
Wlen Castle

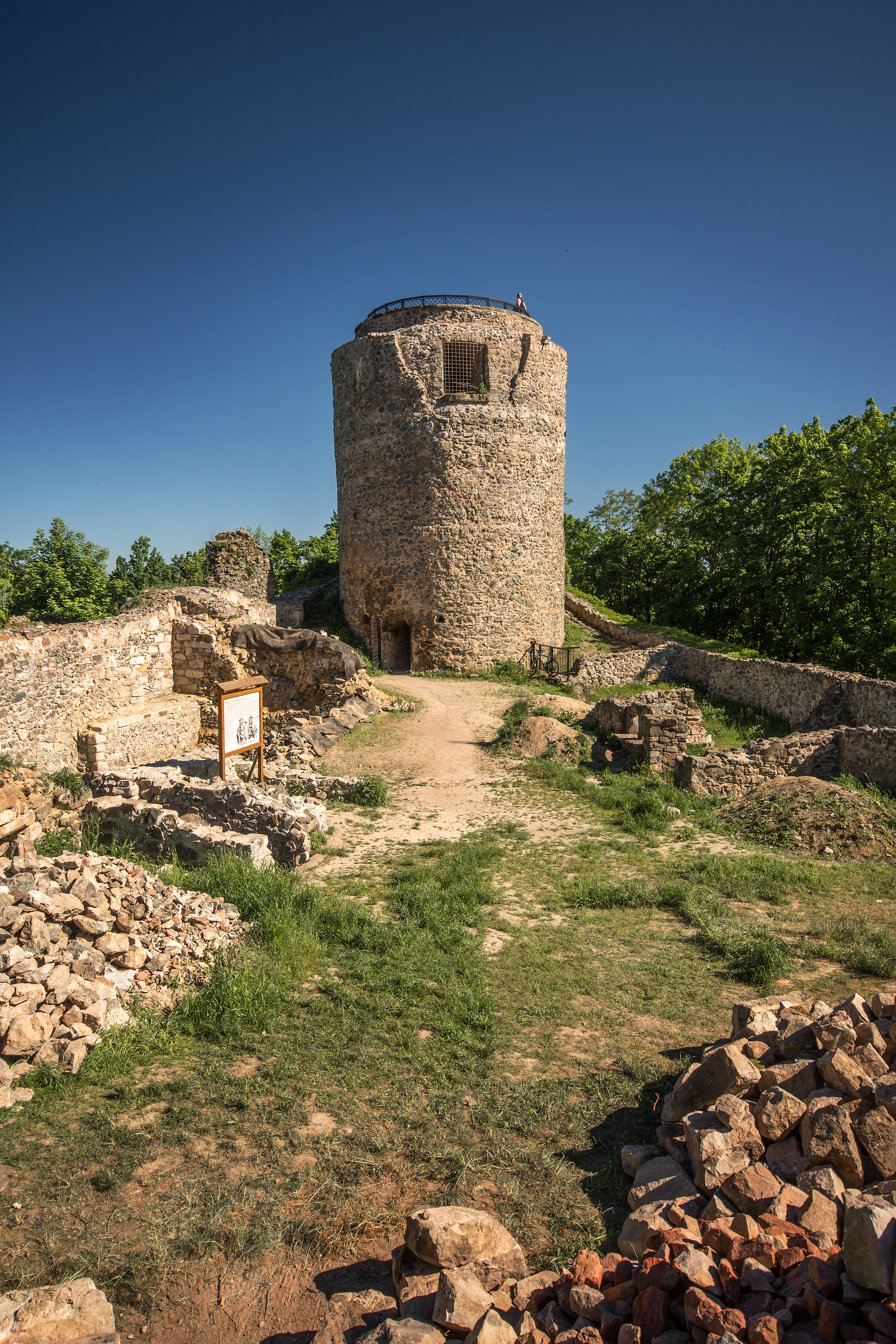
The main tower of the castle

There were also many medieval guard towers along Via Regia road.

== Gallery ==
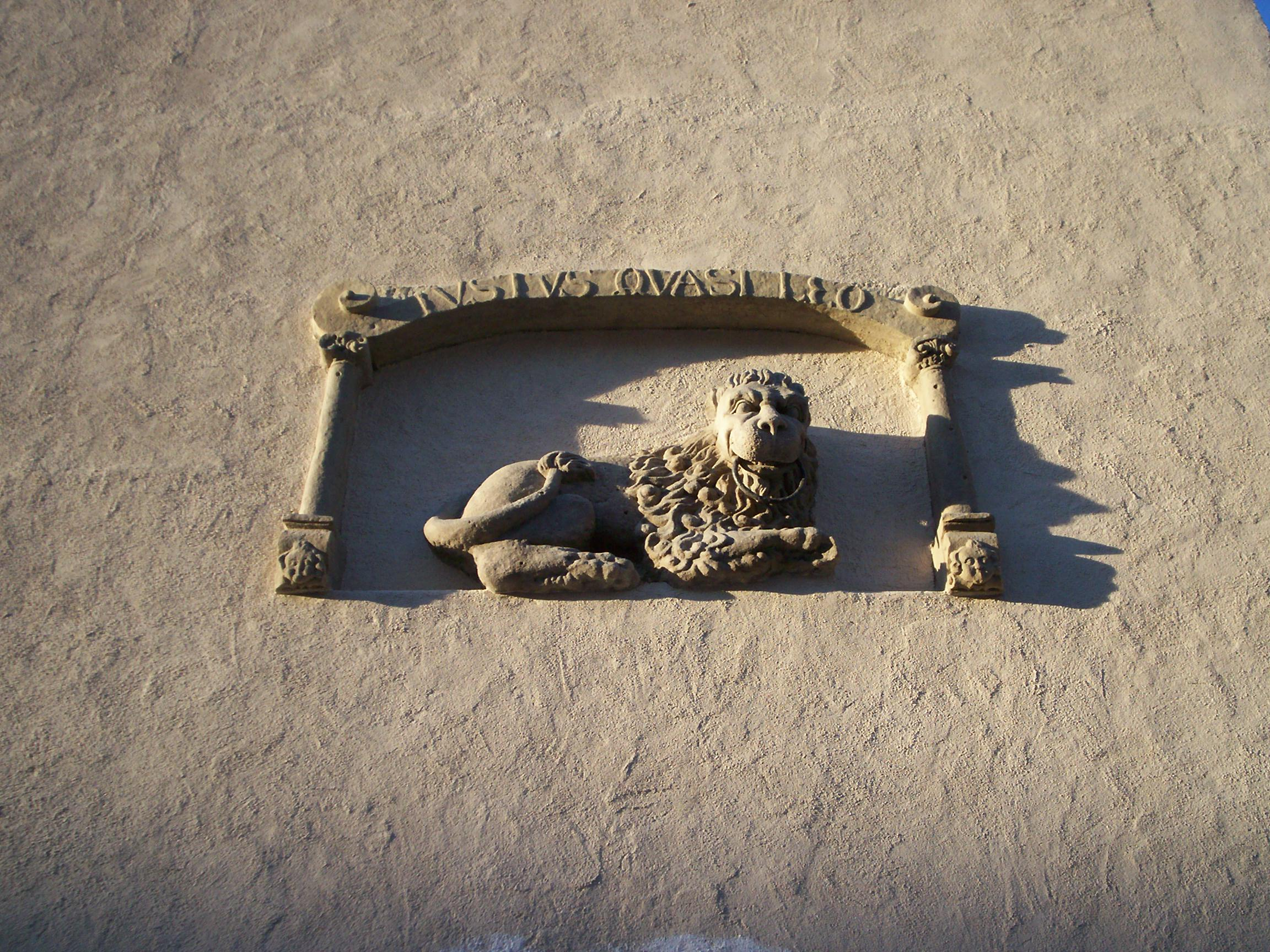
Medieval bas-relief on the south wall of the town hall in Lwowek Slaski - a symbol of the town, with a sentence written in Latin which means "Fair as a lion"

Medieval coat of arms of the town of Lwowek Slaski

Modern coat of arms of the town of Lwowek Slaski

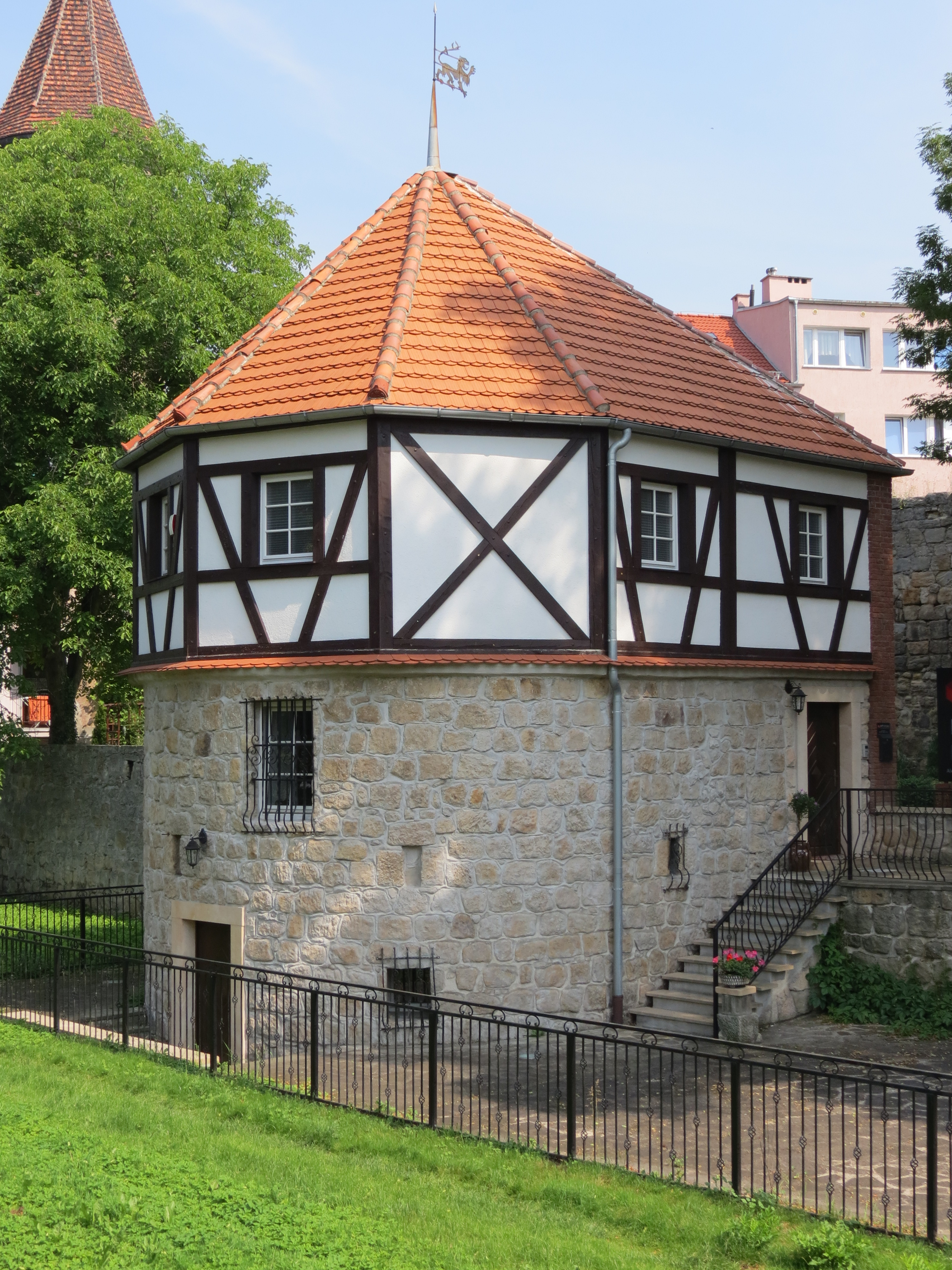
Medieval fortifications of Lwowek Slaski

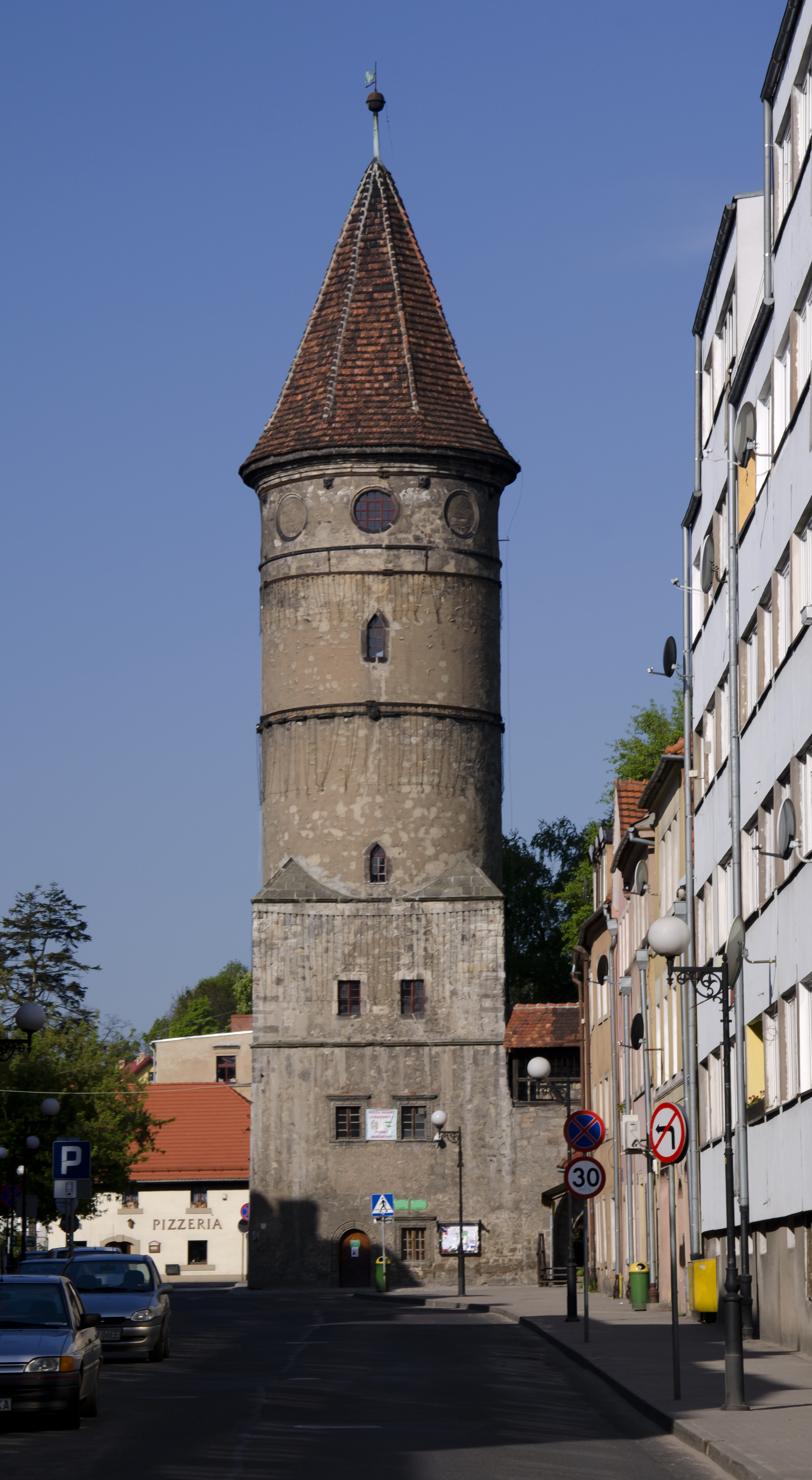
Tower of Lubanian Gate - a place of a former town gate in Lwowek Slaski

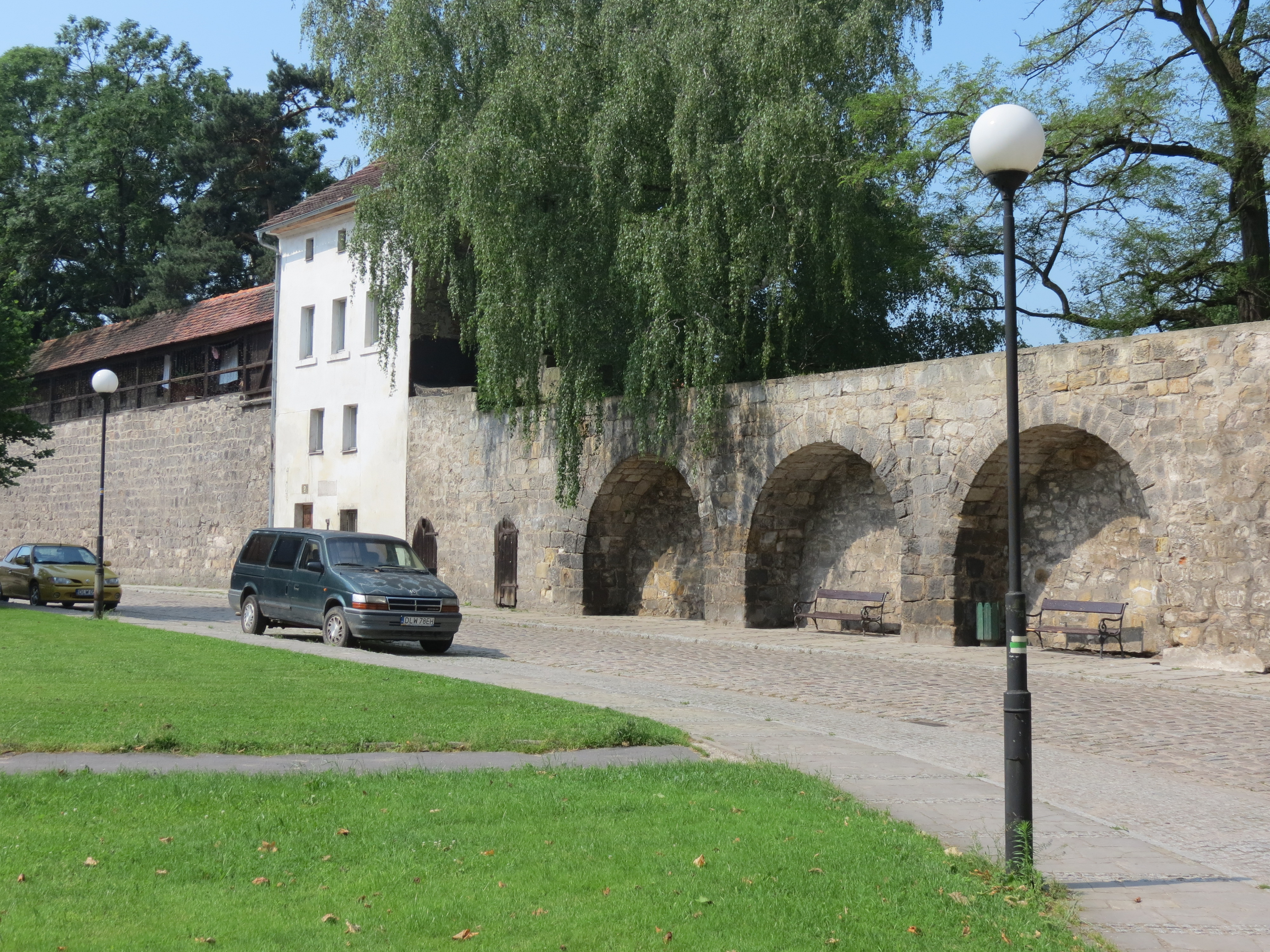
The high town wall of Lwowek Slaski (of double surrounding walls in general)

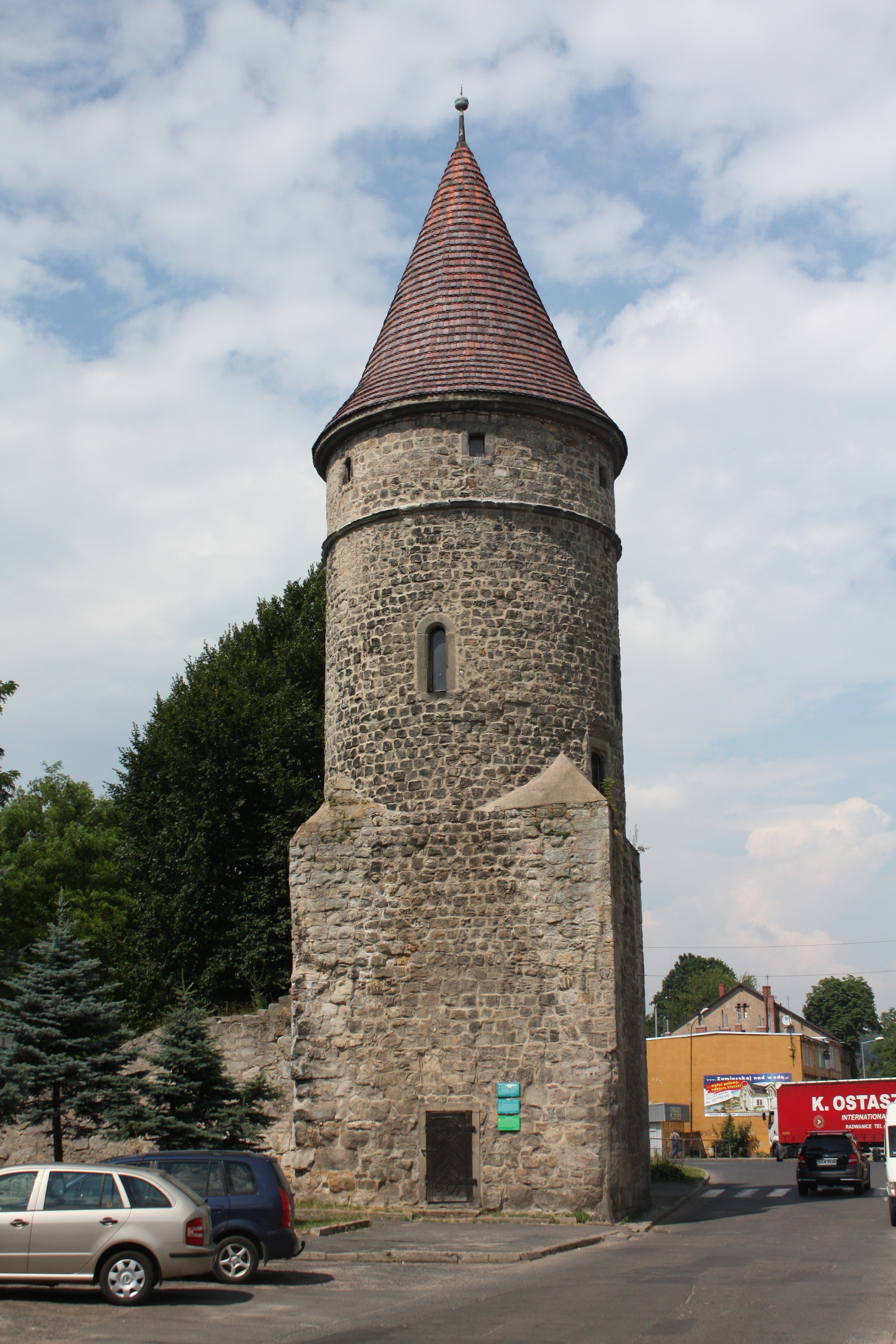
Tower of Boleslawieckan Gate in Lwowek Slaski

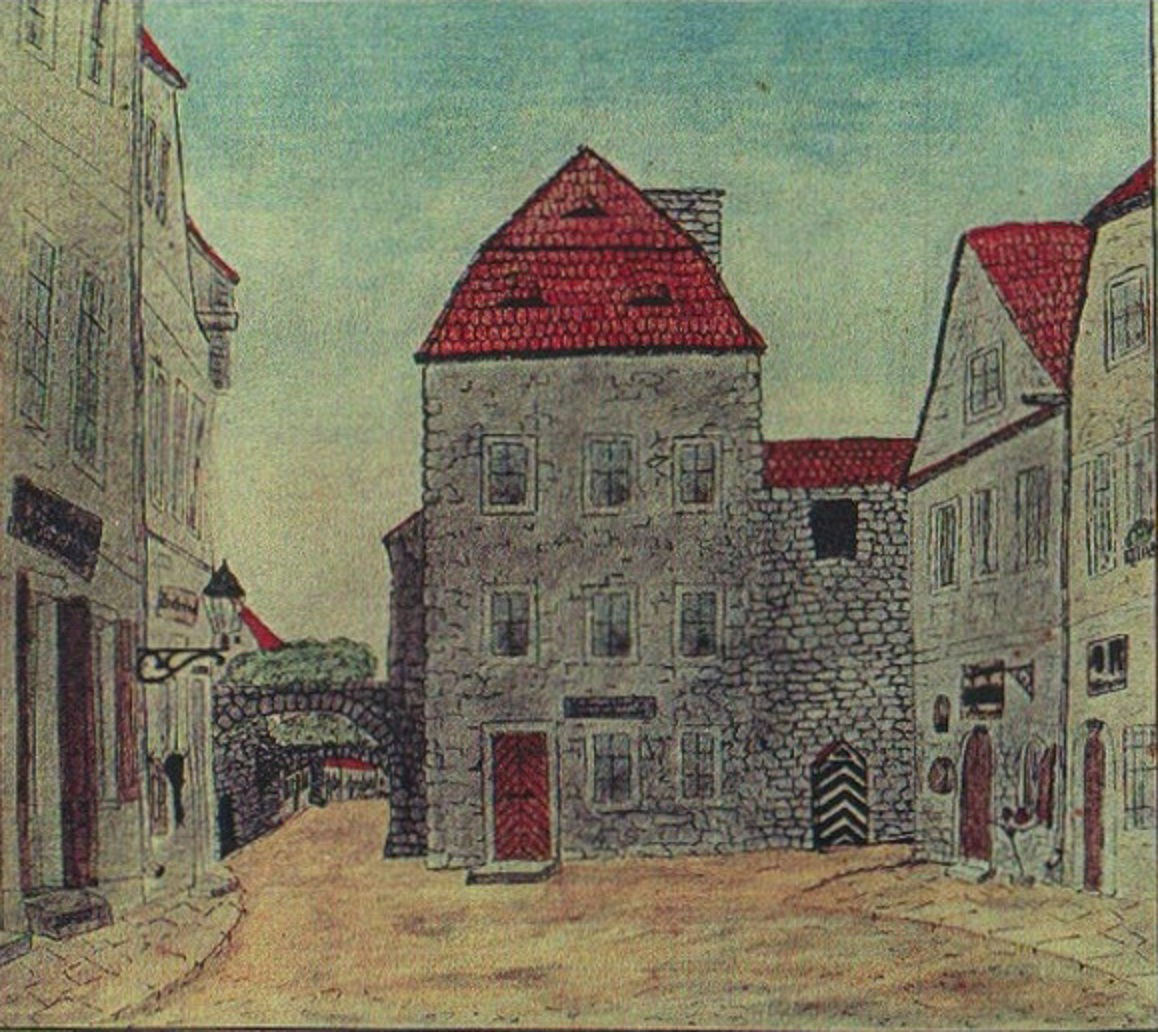
Tower of Złotoryjan Gate in Lwowek

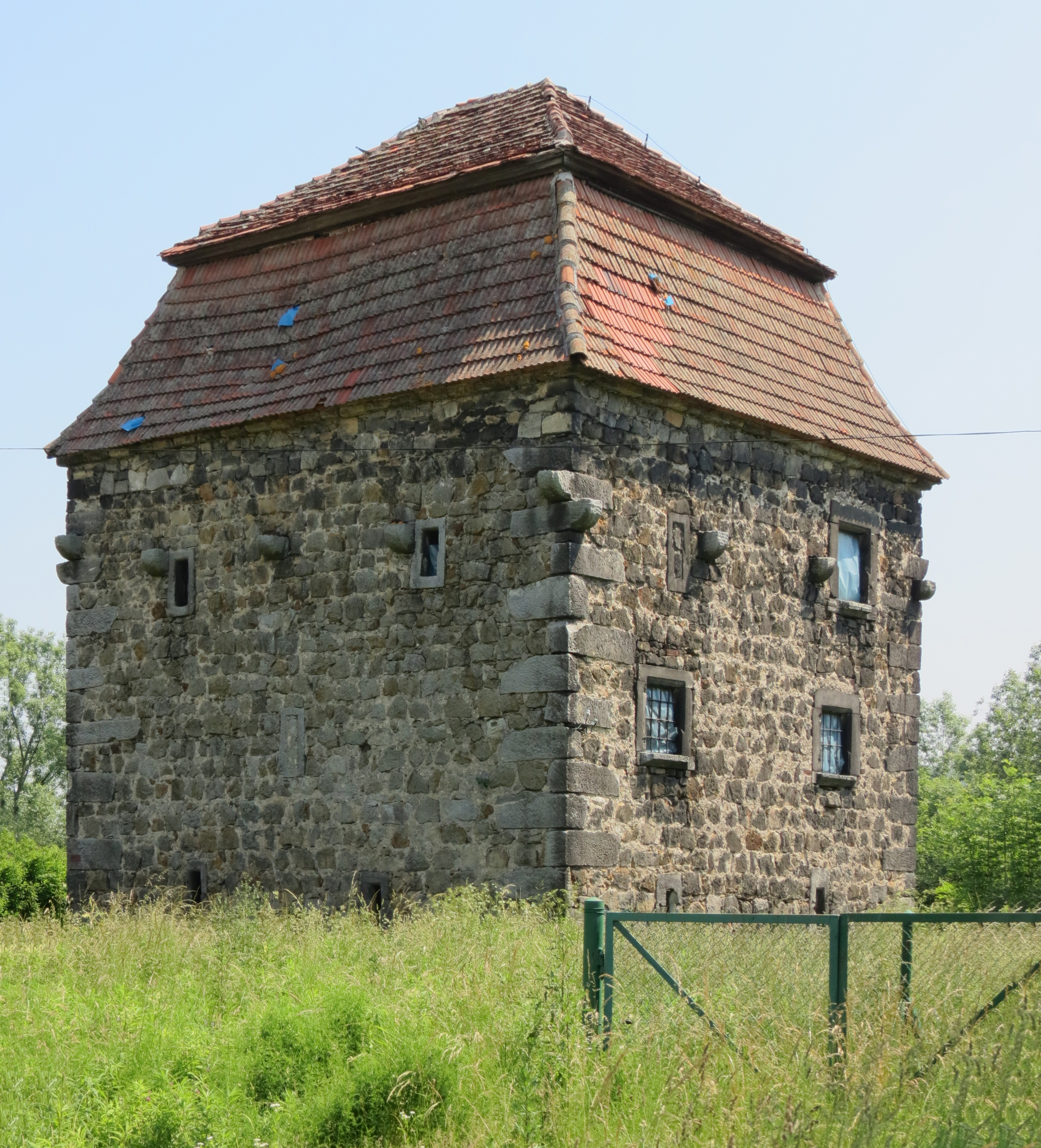
Guard tower in Rakowice Wielkie

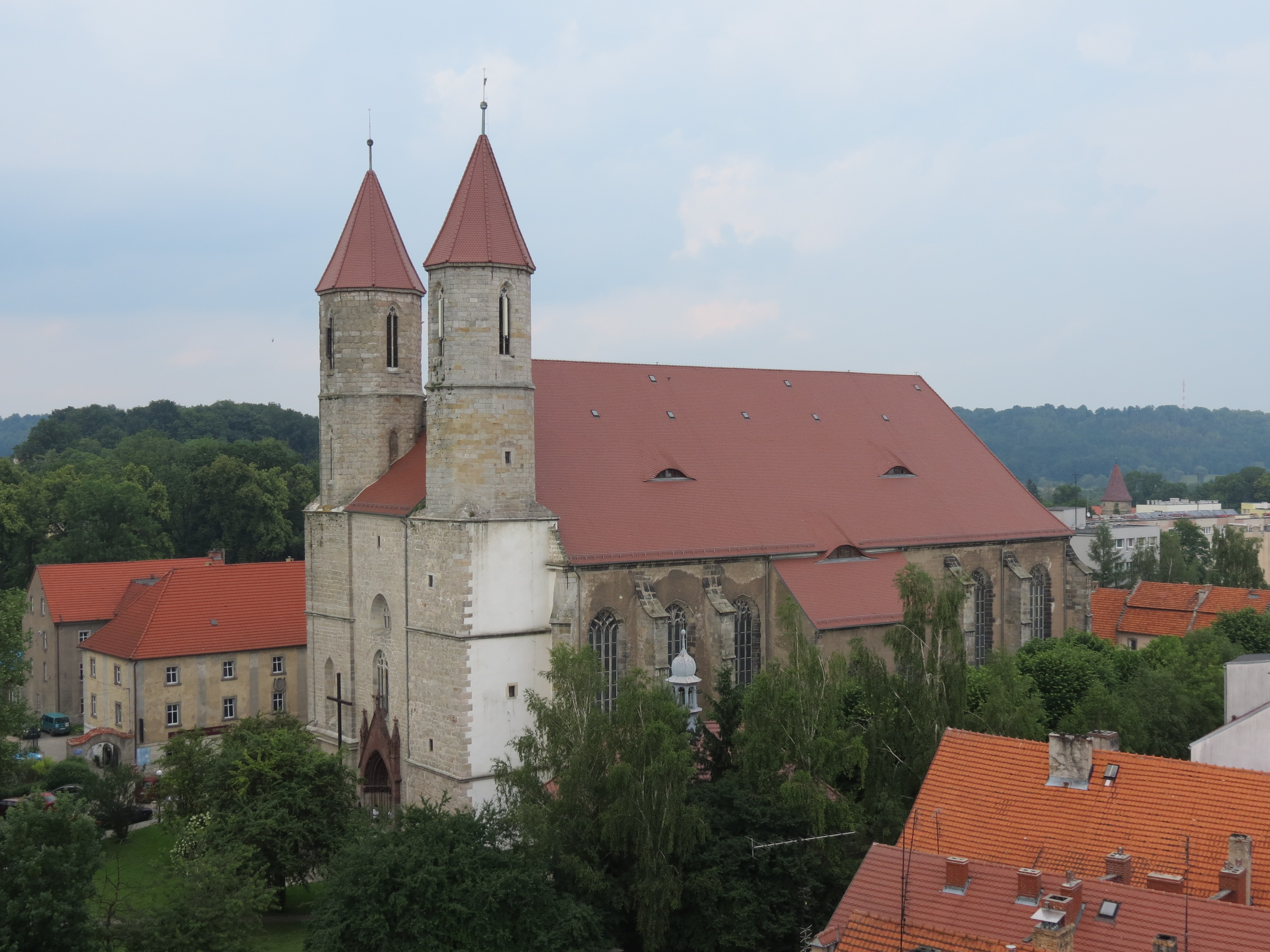
Big church in Lwowek

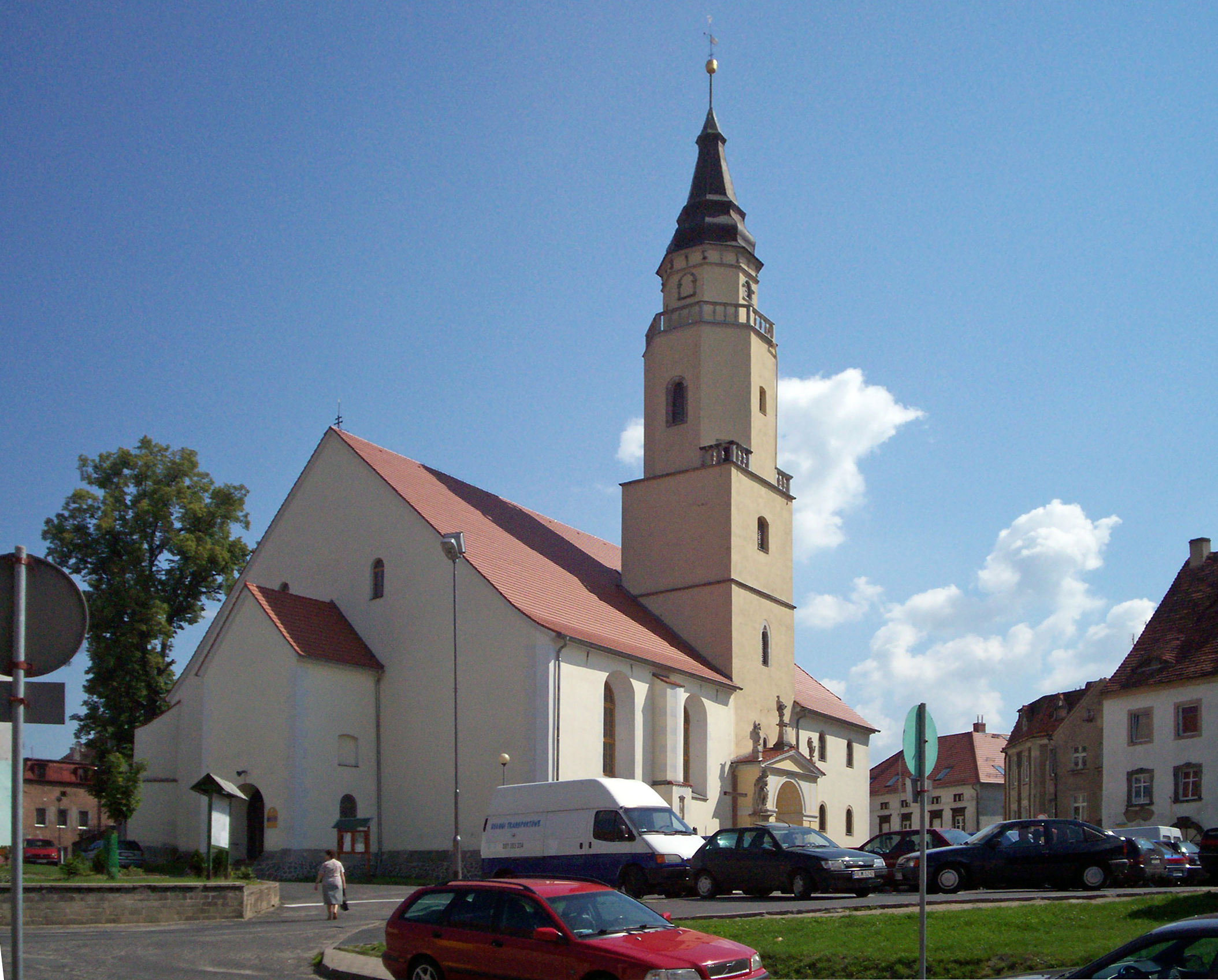
Church of st. Hedwig in Gryfow

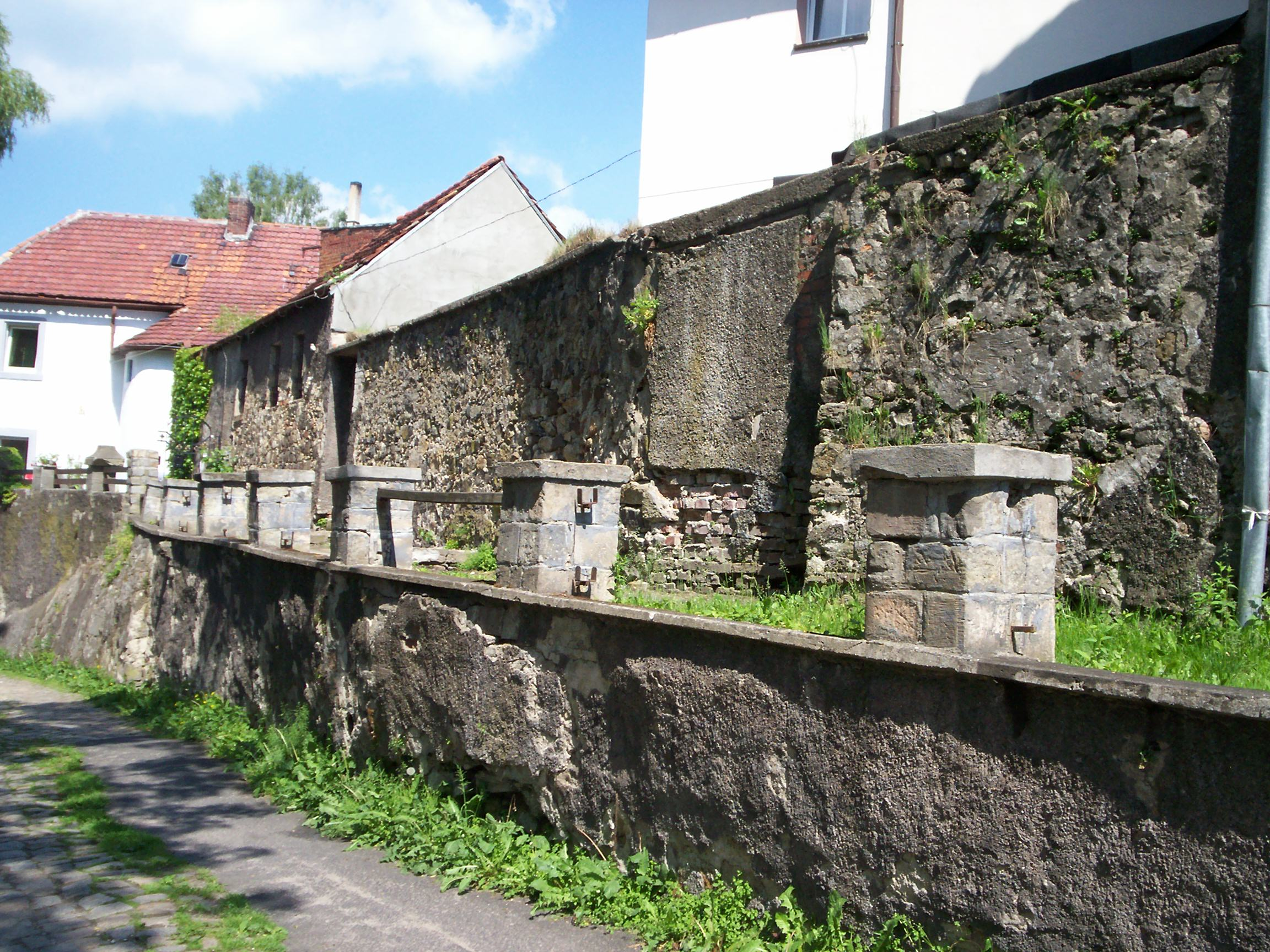
Town walls of Gryfow

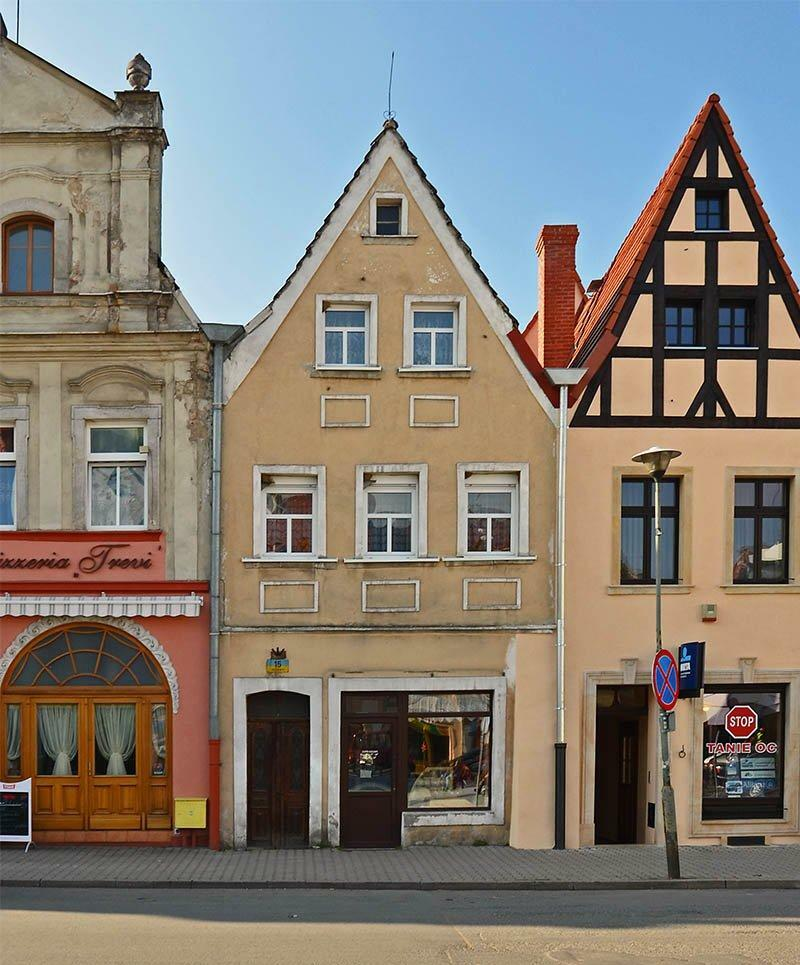
Houses in Gryfow

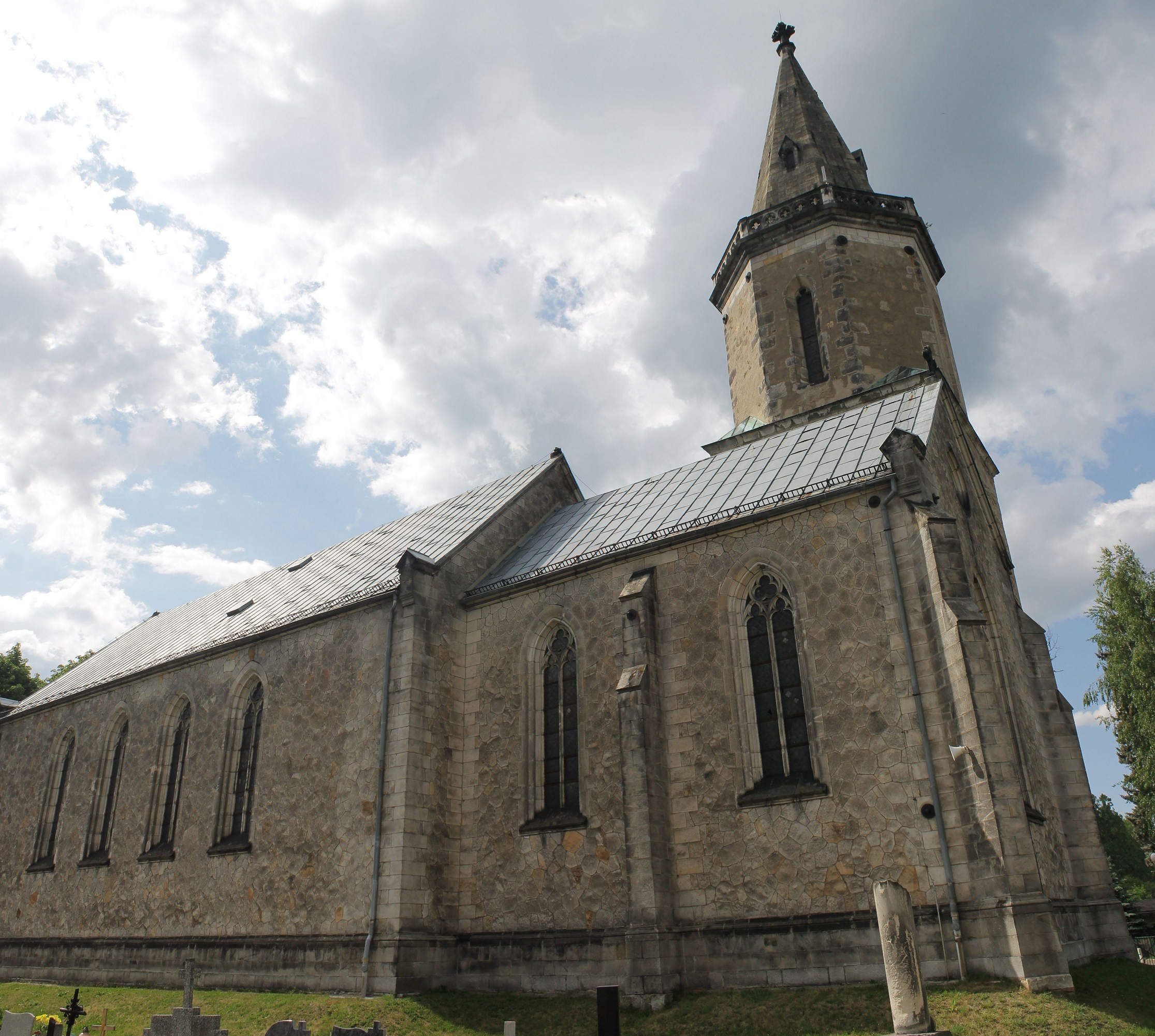
Church in Wlen
