= Flag of Brzeg =

Brzeg
- Flag of Brzeg
- Proportion: 5:8
- Adopted: September 26, 2012
- Design: A red background with a white anchor

The flag of Brzeg is the town flag of the Polish town of Brzeg, adopted based on a design from 21 December 1978. All uniforms and signs have featured the current flag since 28 March 2008.

== History ==
Flag before 2012

The three-anchor symbol in the centre of the flag is identical to the coat of arms of Brzeg. The symbol in the centre of the flag has its origins tracing back from the foundation of Brzeg in 1248, when it was imprinted on the town seal and coins. The symbol is also found in the location prerogatives of the Silesian dukes, such as that of Henry III the White in 1250, and it has remained ever since. The symbol underlines the town's history, which is based around its harbour on the River Odra; the Latin name for the town, Alta Ripa, means "High Bank" in Latin. In 2015, Śląsk Wrocław was fined by UEFA because fans displayed a flag with a neo-Nazi symbol which turned out to be the flag of Brzeg.
