= Duchy of Jawor =

Silesian duchy (1274–1392)

Coordinates: 51°03′00″N 16°12′00″E

Duchy of Jawor Księstwo Jaworskie (Polish) Herzogtum Jauer (German)
- 1274–1290; 1312–1346
- Coat of arms

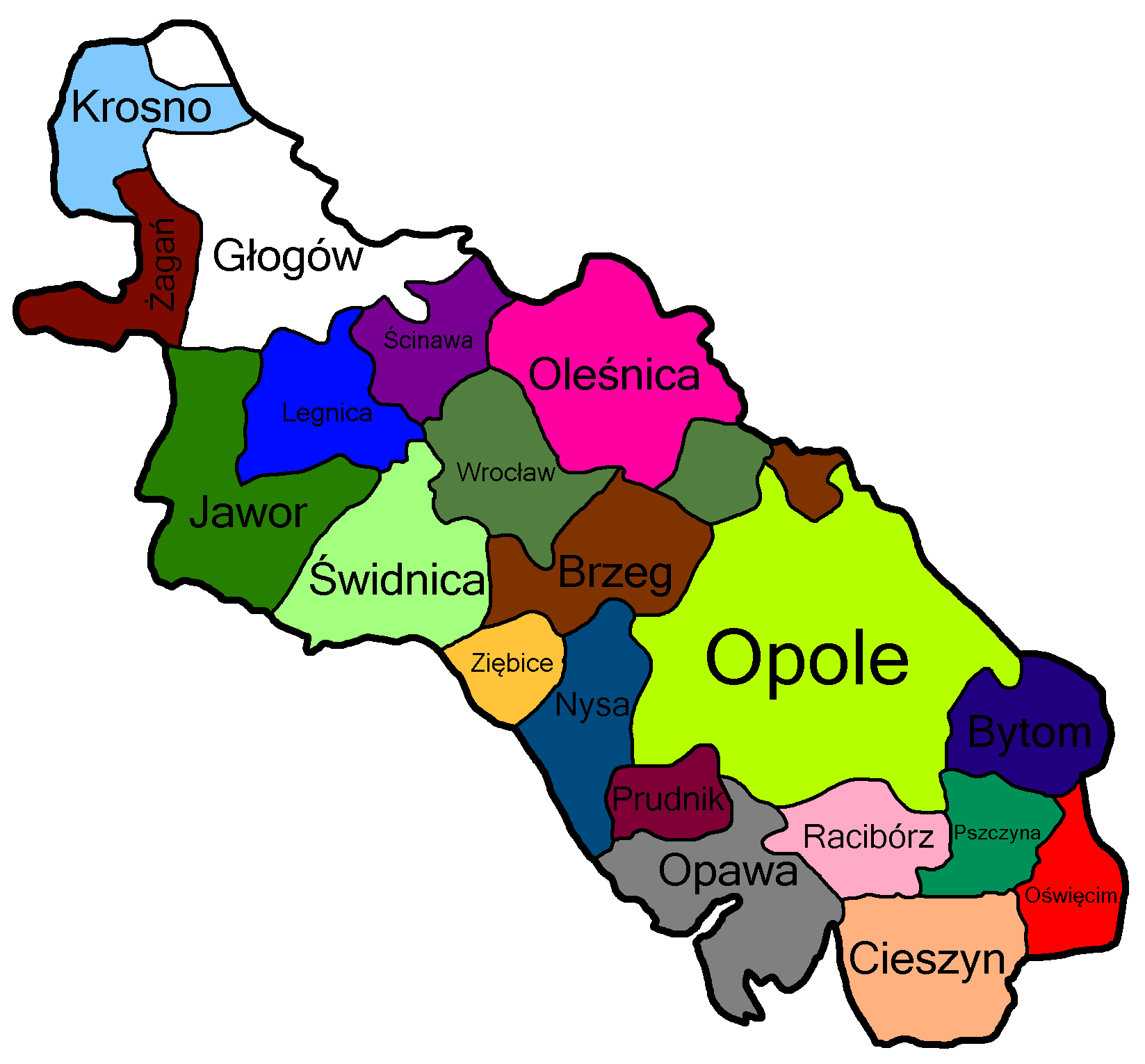
- Duchy of Jawor Silesia in 1274: Jawor Duchy in green
- Status: Silesian duchy
- Capital: Jawor
- Historical era: Middle Ages
  - Partitioned from Legnica: 1274
  - Lwówek split off: 1281
  - Lwówek reintegrated: 1286
  - Acquired Świdnica: 1291
  - Expanded westwards up to Zły Komorów: 1319
  - Reunited with Świdnica: 1346
  - Annexed by Bohemia: 1392
Preceded by	Succeeded by
Duchy of Legnica	Kingdom of Bohemia
- Today part of: Poland; Germany¹
- ¹ Portion of Lusatia, including the towns of Zittau (Polish: Żytawa), Görlitz (Zgorzelec), Ostritz (Ostrowiec), Bernstadt auf dem Eigen (Biernacice), Reichenbach/O.L. (Rychbach), Senftenberg (Zły Komorów) and Rothenburg, Oberlausitz (Rozbork)

Duchy of Jawor (Polish: Księstwo Jaworskie, German: Herzogtum Jauer, Czech: Javorské knížectví) was one of the duchies of Silesia and medieval Poland established in 1274 as a subdivision of the Duchy of Legnica. It was ruled by the Silesian Piasts, with its capital at Jawor in Lower Silesia.

It was the southwesternmost duchy of Poland at the time, with the exception of the 1281–1286 period, when the more southwestern was the temporarily split off Duchy of Lwówek. At various times, it also bordered the fellow Polish duchies of Głogów, Legnica, Wrocław and Świdnica, and via the latter also Nysa, Brzeg and Ziębice.

== Geography ==
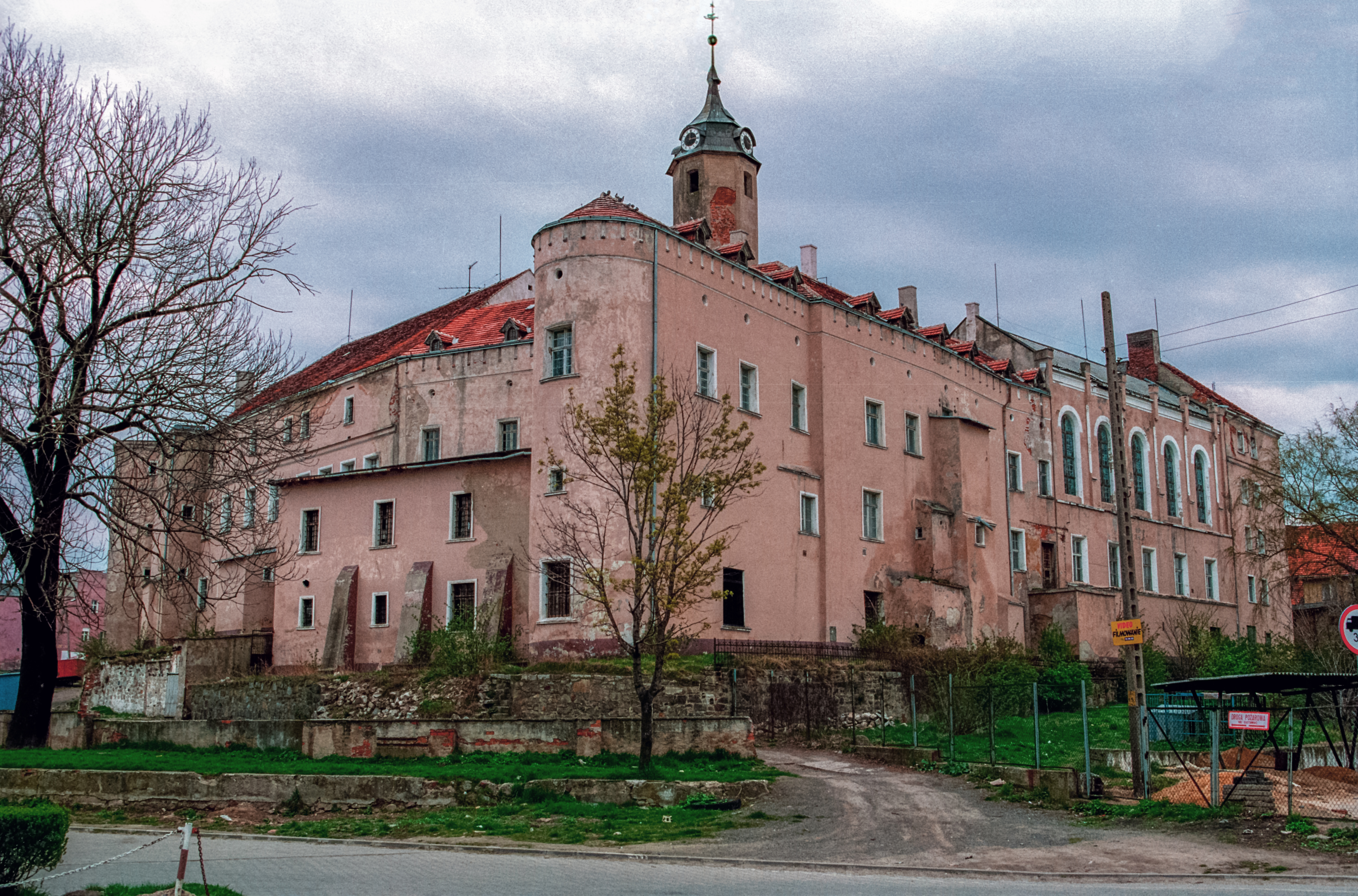
Jawor Castle

The original Duchy stretched from Jawor on the Raging Neisse River westwards along the northern slopes of the Western Sudetes to the Jizera Mountains and the Kwisa River, which formed the Silesian border with the former Milceni lands of Upper Lusatia. In the north it bordered the remaining Duchy of Legnica and in the east the Duchy of Silesia-Wrocław.

It included the towns of Bolesławiec, Bolków, Gryfów, Jawor, Kamienna Góra, Lubawka, Lwówek, Świerzawa, from 1278 also Wleń, and from 1319 also Zgorzelec, Lubań, Trzebiel, Żary, Mirsk, Leśna, Gozdnica, Zawidów, Zły Komorów, Żytawa, Ostrowiec, Biernacice, Rychbach and Rozbork.

== History ==
The Silesian Duchy of Legnica since 1248 had been under the rule of Duke Bolesław II Rogatka. When Bolesław's eldest son Henry V the Fat succeeded his father as Duke of Legnica in 1278, he gave the Jawor subdivision to his younger brothers Bolko I the Strict and Bernard the Lightsome. In 1281 Bernard was made a Duke of Lwówek in the western part of the Jawor lands.

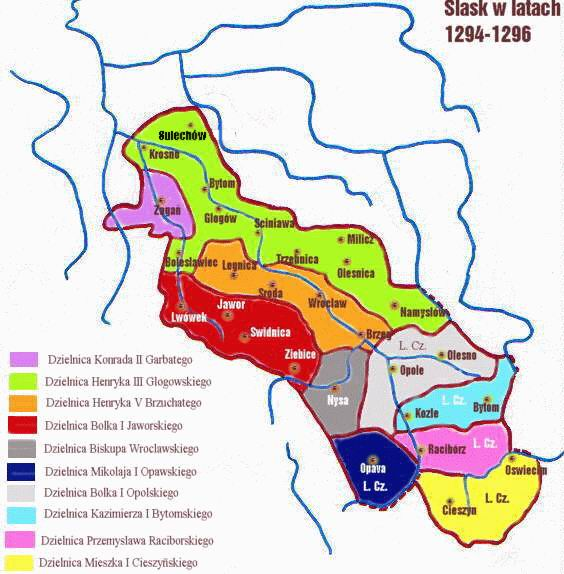
Duchy of Jawor-Świdnica (in red), 1294

In 1286 Bolko I again inherited Lwówek from his brother and in 1291 further enlarged his territories by receiving the Duchy of Świdnica with the towns of Świdnica, Strzegom, Strzelin and Ziębice from his elder brother Henry V of Legnica. These territories had formed the southern part of the Duchy of Wrocław, which Henry V had acquired upon the death of his cousin Duke Henry IV Probus the year before. Henry V, though backed by King Wenceslaus II of Bohemia, was in need for support to retain his Wrocław acquisitions against the claims of rivalling Duke Henry III of Głogów. From 1288 Bolko I had a new residence erected at Książ Castle in the Świdnica lands. For a brief period, his duchy is sometimes known as the Duchy of Jawor-Świdnica.

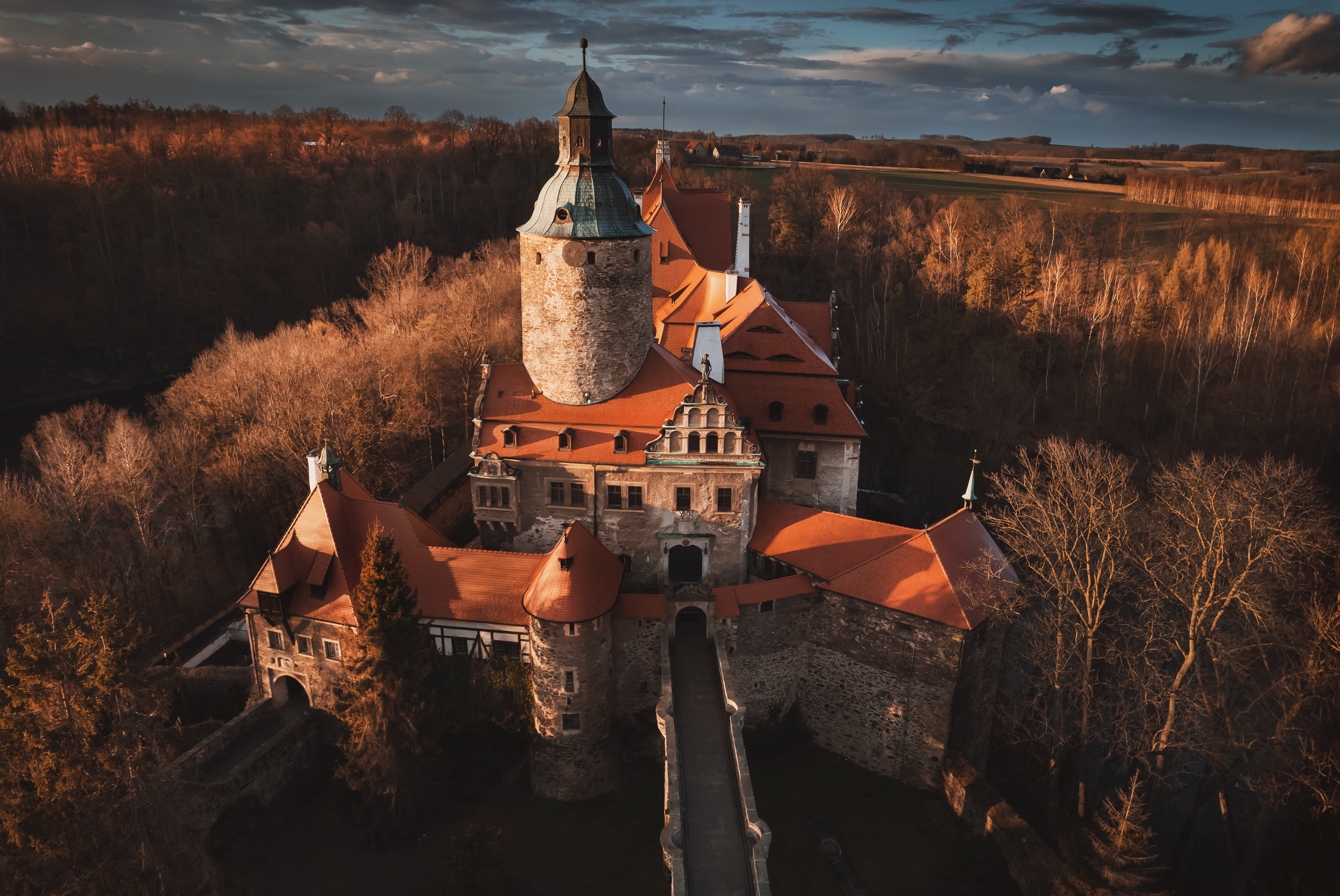
Czocha Castle

Bolko's attempts to gain the Duchy of Nysa failed, nevertheless he occupied Paczków and acquired Chojnów from Duke Henry III of Głogów. After his death in 1301, his sons finally divided their territories in 1312: the lands around Świdnica and Ziębice were again split off into separate duchies, while Jawor was ruled by Duke Henry I. In 1319, Henry I expanded the duchy to the west and northwest, and acquired the towns of Zgorzelec, Lubań, Trzebiel, Żary, Mirsk, Leśna, Zły Komorów, Żytawa, Ostrowiec, Biernacice, Rychbach and Rozbork. In 1320, Henry I captured a large portion of Lubusz Land to the northwest of Silesia, which he tried to reclaim as a region lost by his grandfather Bolesław II the Horned. On 27 July 1320, Henry I entered an alliance with Wartislaw IV, Duke of Pomerania in attempt to retain Lubusz Land and capture the towns of Strausberg and Wriezen. In August 1320, the forces of Henry I aided Wartislaw IV in the Uckermark, but lost to Mecklenburg, and in the following months Henry I lost Lubusz Land. After his death in 1346, the duchy was reunited with Świdnica under the rule of his nephew Bolko II the Small.

Bolko II was the last Piast duke to retain his independence from the Kingdom of Bohemia, however as he had no male heirs he signed an inheritance treaty with King Charles IV of Luxembourg, who married Bolko's niece Anna von Schweidnitz in 1353. The duke died in 1368 and after the death of his widow Agnes of Habsburg in 1392 his duchy was finally annexed by the Bohemian Crown.

== Gallery ==
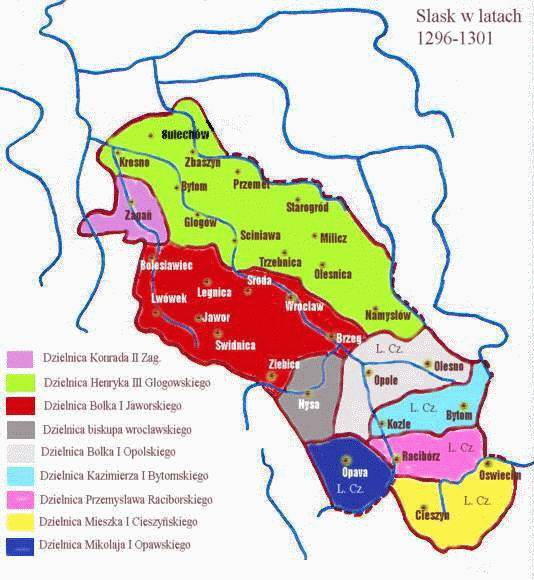
Growth of the Jawor Duchy (in red) in the late 1290s

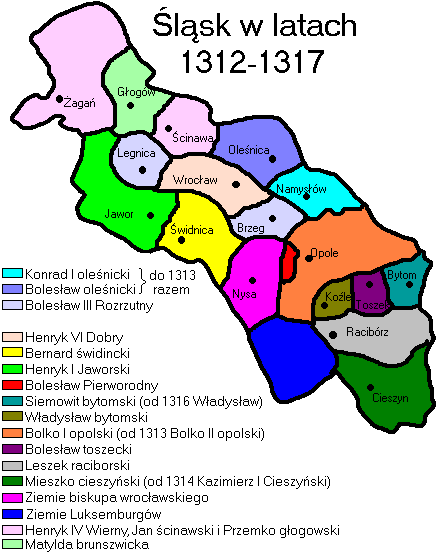
Jawor Duchy (in light green) is reduced to its original size in 1312.

== See also ==
- Dukes of Silesia

== Literature ==
- Historische Kommission für Schlesien (Hrsg.): Geschichte Schlesiens, Bd. 1. Sigmaringen 1988, ISBN 3-7995-6341-5, p. 146, 150, 172f., 185f., 211, 221f. and 289.
- Hugo Weczerka: Handbuch der historischen Stätten: Schlesien. Stuttgart, 1977, ISBN 3-520-31601-3, p. 206–210 and 491–496, genealogy on p. 593.
- Joachim Bahlcke: Schlesien und die Schlesier, Langen-Müller-Verlag, 2000, ISBN 3-7844-2781-2
- Žáček, Rudolf (2004). Dějiny Slezska v datech [History of Silesia in Dates] (in Czech). Prague: Libri. pp. 420, 446–448. ISBN 80-7277-172-8.
- Orzechowski, Kazimierz; Przybytek, Dariusz; Ptak, Marian (2008). Dolny Śląsk. Podziały terytorialne od X do XX wieku (in Polish). Wrocław. ISBN 978-83-923255-5-0.
