= Henry III the White =

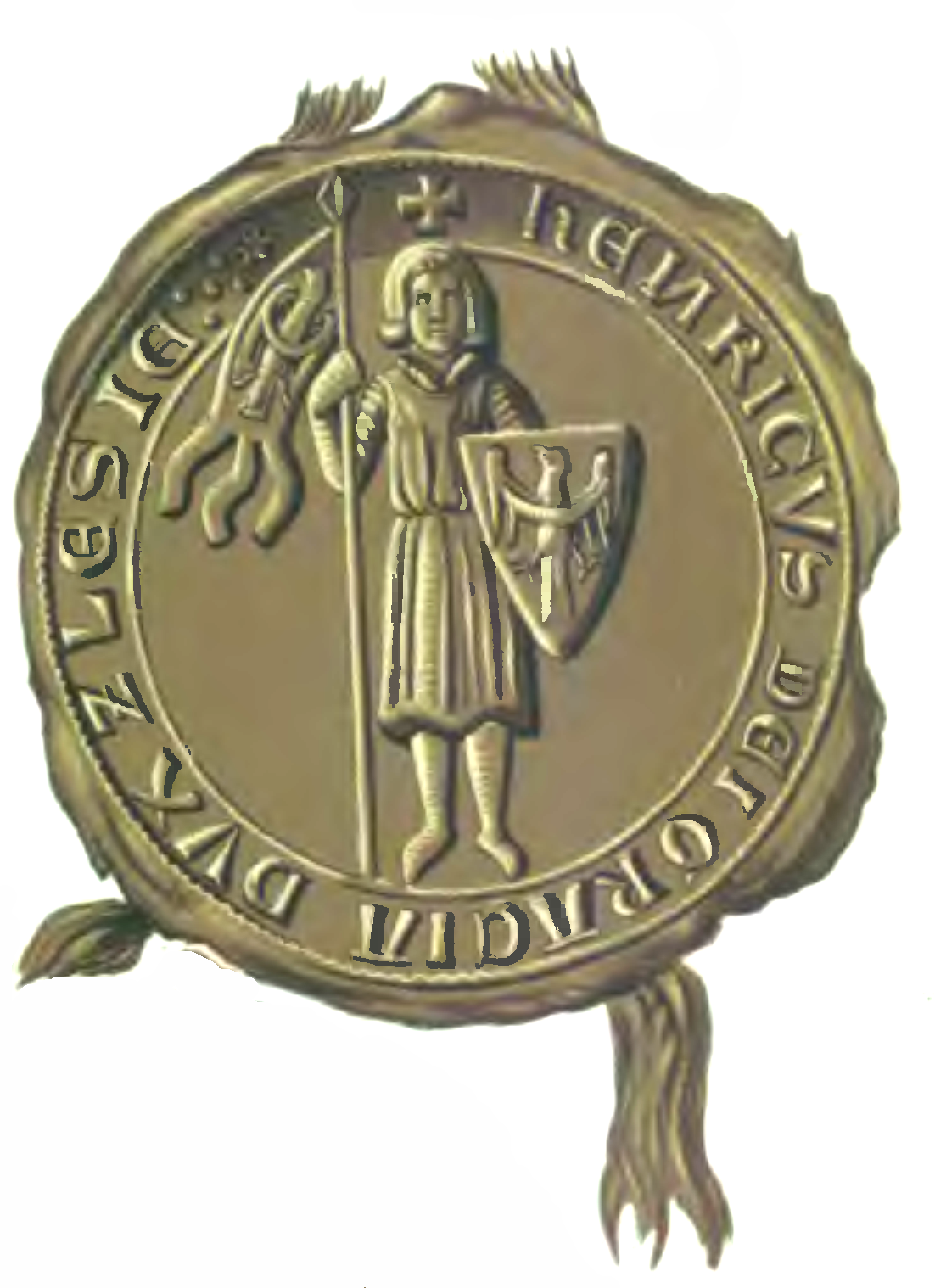
- Seal of Duke Henry III

Duke of Silesia-Wrocław
- Reign: 1248–1266
- Predecessor: Bolesław II Rogatka
- Successor: Henry IV Probus
- Born: c. 1227/1230
- Died: 3 December 1266
- Spouse: Judith of Masovia; Helene of Saxony
- Issue: Henry IV Probus
- House: Silesian Piasts
- Father: Henry II the Pious
- Mother: Anne of Bohemia

Henry III the White (Polish: Henryk III Biały; c. 1227/1230 – 3 December 1266), a member of the Silesian Piasts, was Duke of Silesia at Wrocław from 1248 until his death, as co-ruler with his brother Władysław.

== Life ==
He was the third son of the Polish high duke Henry II the Pious, by his wife Princess Anna, daughter of the Přemyslid king Ottokar I of Bohemia. After the heroic death of his father at the Battle of Legnica on 9 April 1241, Henry III was still a minor and found himself under the care of the mother together with his youngest brothers Konrad and Władysław.

In 1242, the unexpected death of his brother Mieszko, placed him in the second place immediately after his oldest brother Bolesław II the Bald. Since then, he became in the head of the political opposition in the Lower Silesia against the government of Bolesław II.

=== Duke of Wrocław ===
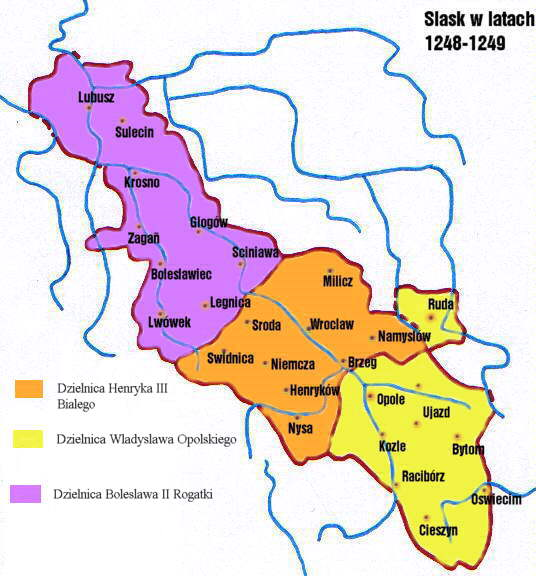
Silesian partition of 1248/49, Henry's Duchy of Wrocław in orange

The first appearance of Henry III as adult was found only in 1247; however, Bolesław II didn't have any intentions to share the power with him. He only changed his mind after the revolt of his brothers, who even captured him. Henry III was made the co-ruler with his older brother. The cooperation between the brothers was not very good and a year later, under pressure from Henry III, they decided to make a division of the districts Legnica–Głogów–Lubusz and Wrocław. Bolesław, as the older brother, had the opportunity to choose his district; he decided on Legnica, because gold had been discovered in the Kaczawa and Wierzbiak Rivers.

Bolesław II may have hoped that Henry III encountered serious difficulties with Wrocław (which he received in the division), so at the end the Duchy would come back to him. These expectations, however, never happened. Henry III was a strong ruler, and almost immediately he could impose his will over the powerful nobility. An additional point of the agreement was the obligation to offer hospitality to the younger brothers, Konrad and Władysław, who were destined to the espiritual career. Henry III's successful attempts to make Władysław entered in the Church had a total contrast with the relations between Bolesław and Konrad. Between them, were several disputes, in particular after Konrad claimed his own district and refused to become a priest. Open war between Henry III (who supported Konrad) and Bolesław II was only a matter of time.

Bolesław II, without funds, began to fear the prospect of an armed conflict with his brothers. In order to obtain the necessary resources to conduct the war, he decided to sell half of Lubusz to the Archbishop of Magdeburg. Unfortunately for him, Henry III also began to seek an ally in the rulers of Meissen. Defeated, Bolesław II was forced to give the district of Głogów to Konrad, who wished to enforce Henry III's intervention over Legnica in 1250. When Konrad decided on Bolesław II's kidnapping, even to the ruler of Wrocław, this was too much. All these treatments are not expected to take effect over the Duke of Wrocław, however, as Henry III in his relations with the brothers now sought to avoid open conflicts. Only in 1253, when the authority of Bolesław II collapsed completely, Henry III helped him to return to his Duchy.

=== Alliance with Bohemia and war against the Greater Poland dukes ===
Between the 1250s and 1260s Henry III became the most powerful Piast Duke of Lower Silesia. Consequently, it was not surprising that he was active in international politics. Henry III made alliances with his relatives, the Dukes of Opole and Głogów, and with the Kings of Bohemia, Wenceslaus I and Ottokar II (in the years 1251, 1252, 1259, 1261 Henry III was in the royal court in Prague). The cooperation with the Přemyslids, however, was not having the expected results. After Bohemia decided to interfere in the War of the Babenberg Succession over Austria with the support of the English, Henry III decided to reaffirm his alliance with them and repudiated his treaty with the rulers of Greater Poland, Przemysł I and Bolesław the Pious and the Árpád dynasty. They decided to punish Henry III, and during 1253–1254 the Duchy of Wrocław was besieged and plundered. Attempts to force concessions, either by blackmail (as was the case in 1256, when the sons of Henry II the Pious took the intervention of the papal Curia, but to regain some lost by Bolesław the Pious) or bribery (the exchange of Dańkow in 1262, promised by Henry III to Bolesław the Pious and Bolesław V the Chaste if they switched to the Bohemian side) did not yield a positive result.

=== Internal politics and relations with the nobility ===
In the internal politics, Henry III stood on guard to defend the prerogatives of the Piast dynasty, and the church actively supported him, because Henry III supported Bishop Thomas of Wrocław against Bolesław II in their disputes. This particular policy was not pleasing the Wrocław nobility; by 1266 several riots erupted among the nobles and knights, which contributed to the premature death of the Duke.

Another manifestation of Henry III's rule was the intensive German colonization of Lower Silesia, which significantly contributed to the growth and prosperity of his Duchy. Many cities were founded during this time, and in Ostrów Tumski in Wrocław a huge castle was built. Henry III also generously supported artists in his court. In the 13th century, German was the language of policy.

=== Revolt of 1266 ===
The dictatorial internal politics of Henry III led to a rebellion of the townspeople. The pretext emerged in the mid-year 1266 when they tried to forced a division of the Duchy of Wrocław between Henry III and his brother Archbishop Władysław of Salzburg. Władysław was not the head of the revolt and this was total surprise to him. His origins are certainly among the nobility.

The Polish historian Jerzy Mularczyk, had two possibles leaders of the revolt: first, the Bishop Thomas of Wrocław, who, taking advantage from Henry III's apparent weakness, tried to strengthen the position of the church; but after watching how the Duke concentrated all the power in his hands and stripped the nobility from his privileges, he feared that this also happened with the Church hierarchy, which certainly he did not permit.

The second possible leader was to be Bolesław II the Bald who hoped, in case of the eventual division of the Duchy of Wrocław and the expected death of Władysław without heirs -because he followed the spiritual career-, recovered at least 1/3 of Wrocław (the remaining 2/3 would be retained by Henry III, his other brother Konrad, and their descendants) for him or his successors. The rapprochement between Bishop Thomas and Bolesław II was proved by a document, in which the Duke of Legnica called Bishop Thomas as his "compater noster", an unusual way to refer to somebody who supposed a close bond between them. However, there did not exist direct evidence for this theory. Of the revolt of the mid-year 1266 little is known, but it certainly failed, as the Duchy was not divided.

=== Death ===
Henry III was not in time to celebrate his success, because only a few months later he suddenly died when he was only thirty-nine years old. Like is common in such situations, soon began the rumours about poisoning. This is reflected, in the Kronika polska written by the cisternian monk Engelbert around 1283–1285.

The source of the unnatural circumstances of his death suggests that some of the Silesian Dukes maybe conspired against him, and this suggestion is not unfounded. This was proved by the last months of Henry III's life, as he spent all this time fighting against the internal opposition of his rule. Certainly there was a large group of people affected by the Duke's punishment after the end of the revolt who decided to eliminate him from the scene.

The participation of the two possible leaders of the revolt of mid-1266, Bishop Thomas and Bolesław II the Bald, and seems unlikely. Their benefits from Henry III's death were small: Wrocław passed into the hands of Henry IV, a minor, under the regency of the Archbishop Władysław, which doesn't change the radical politics of his late brother. Henry III's dying request to extend the rule of Władysław's regency was made with the clear purpose to reduce the suspicion of guilt against him. Guilty for his death should therefore be found primarily among those dissatisfied with the rule of knights, or divide Wrocław.

In addition to the Kronika polska, the mysterious death of Henry III was written even on his tombstone: Anno domini Millesimo, Nonas Decembris obiit veneno inclitus dux Wratislaviensis Henricus tertius, secundus filius secundi Henrici, a Thartaris. From there, this information will be received by the Chronicle of the Silesian Dukes and the Genealogy and life of St. Hedwig to Jan Długosz.

The year of Henry III's death is absolutely certain, as is confirmed by all the documentary and oral sources of that time. However, there are disparities about the exact date. 3 December was confirmed as the best, although there are also sources date: 1 December, 5 December and 29 November. Henry III was buried in the Clare Church in Wrocław, which was still under construction.

== Marriages and issue ==
The black crownless eagle of the Silesian Piasts

On 2 June 1252, Henry III married firstly with Judith (b. 1222/25 – d. 4 December 1257/65?), daughter of Duke Konrad I of Masovia and widow of Mieszko II the Fat, Duke of Opole. They had two children:

1. Hedwig (b. ca. 1256 – d. aft. 14 December 1300), married firstly by 1271/72 to Henry, Lord of Pleissnerland -eldest son of Albert II, Margrave of Meissen-, and secondly in 1283 with Otto I, Prince of Anhalt-Aschersleben.
2. Henry IV Probus (b. ca. 1258 – d. 24 June 1290).

Shortly before his death in 1266, Henry III married secondly with Helena (b. 1247 – d. 12 June 1309), daughter of Albert I, Duke of Saxony. They had no children.

Henry III the White House of Piast Born: c. 1227/1230 Died: 3 December 1266
Preceded by Bolesław II the Bald	Duke of Wrocław with Władysław; 1248–1266	Succeeded by Henry IV Probus and Władysław
