= Bolesław II the Horned =

High Duke of Poland
- Reign: 1241
- Predecessor: Henry II the Pious
- Successor: Konrad I of Masovia

Duke of Silesia
- Reign: 1241 – 1248
- Predecessor: Henry II the Pious
- Successor: Henry III the White

Duke of Legnica
- Reign: 1248 – 1278
- Successor: Henry V
- Born: c. 1220-1225
- Died: 26/31 December 1278
- Spouse: Hedwig of Anhalt; Euphemia of Pomerania; Sophia of Dyhrn
- Issue more...: Henry V, Duke of Legnica; Bolko I the Strict; Bernard the Lightsome
- House: Silesian Piasts
- Father: Henry II the Pious
- Mother: Anna of Bohemia

Bolesław II the Horned (Polish: Bolesław II Rogatka), known also as Bolesław II the Bald (Polish: Bolesław II Łysy; c. 1220/1225 – 26/31 December 1278), a member of the Silesian Piasts, was High Duke of Poland briefly in 1241 and Duke of Silesia at Wrocław from 1241 until 1248, when the duchy was divided between him and his brothers. After the partition, he ruled the Silesian Duchy of Legnica until his death. The second Mongol raid against Poland, led by Nogai Khan, occurred during his reign.

== Family history ==
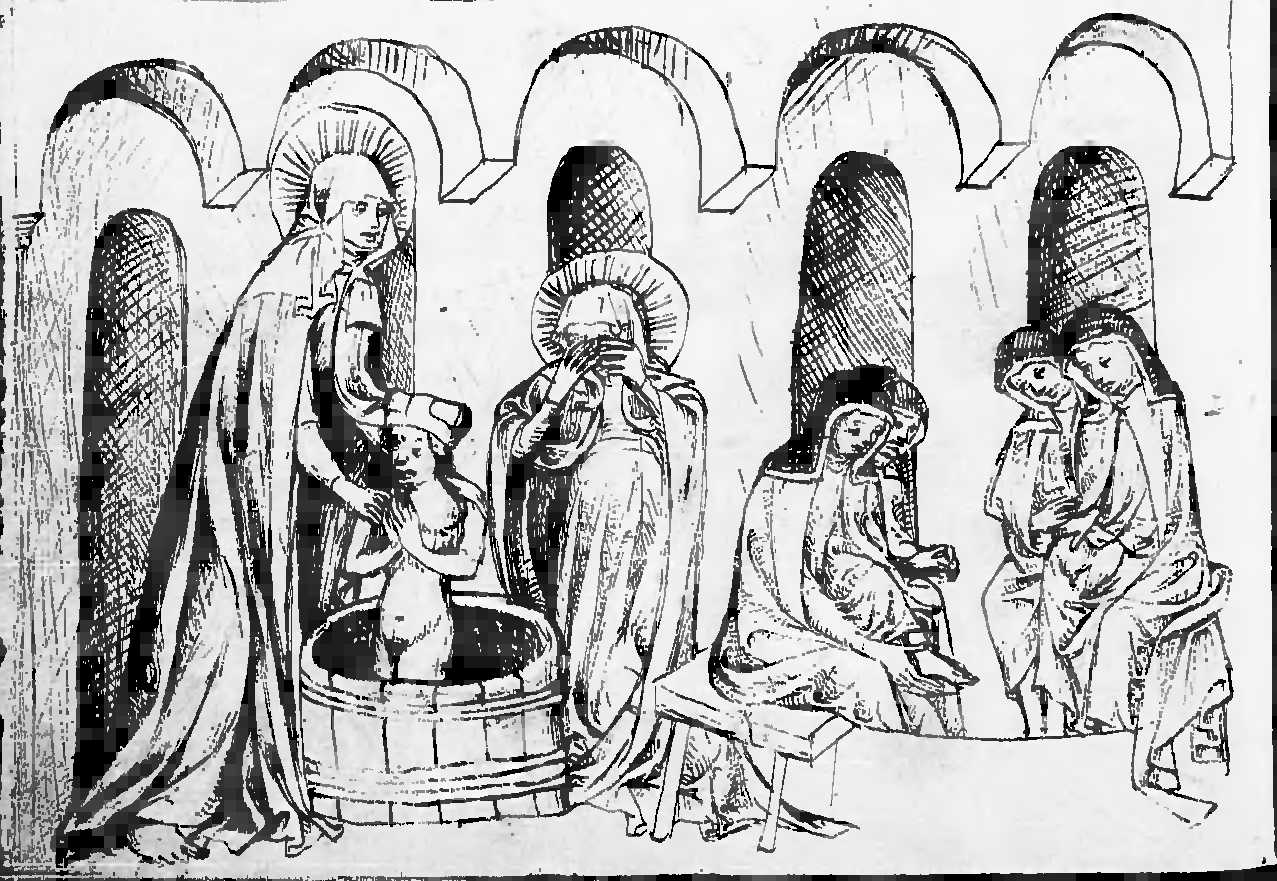
Saint Hedwig of Silesia bathing her grandson Bolesław

Bolesław was the eldest son of the Polish high duke Henry II the Pious by his wife Anna, a daughter of the Přemyslid king Ottokar I of Bohemia. His paternal grandparents were Henry the Bearded and Hedwig of Silesia. Among his younger siblings were Mieszko (died 1242), Henry III the White (d. 1266), Konrad II (d. 1274), Władysław (d. 1270), and Elisabeth (d. 1265), who married her Piast cousin Duke Przemysł I of Greater Poland.

== Accession ==
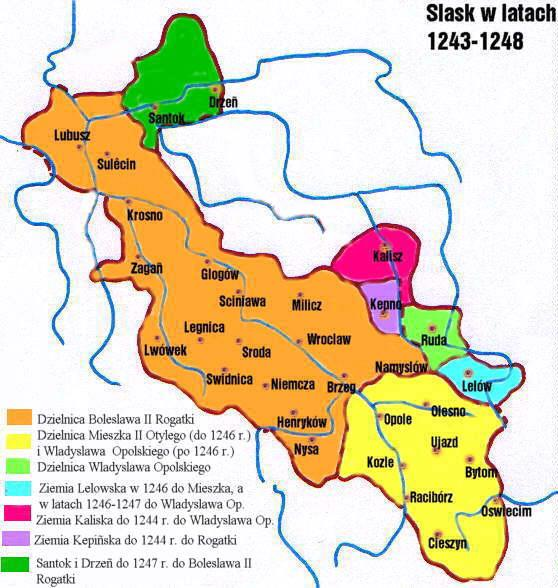
Lower Silesian lands (in orange) ruled by Bolesław until 1248

Bolesław succeeded as Duke of Silesia after his father, Henry II the Pious, was killed in the Battle of Legnica on 9 April 1241, fighting against the Mongol invaders led by Batu Khan. At the time, he and his immediate younger brother Mieszko were the only heirs who had reached majority. Their mother Anna helped them during the transition; some sources even call this period a regency. The Mongol forces conquered most of Silesia, but then withdrew to Hungary.

After Henry's death, the Silesian Piasts were not able to maintain their supremacy in the Polish lands. Bolesław's inheritance, including the Southern Greater Polish estates and the Lesser Polish Seniorate Province, was threatened by neighboring Piast dukes. By July 1241, his cousin Konrad I of Masovia tried to take over the Polish throne at Kraków. The local nobles, led by the Kraków governor Clement of Ruszczy, strongly resisted but eventually had to yield to Konrad's superior forces. Disappointed by Bolesław's lack of action, they turned their support to Bolesław V the Chaste, who ascended the Kraków throne in 1243.

There was a similar situation in Greater Poland: after hearing the news of the defeat of Henry II in Legnica, Duke Przemysł I and his brother Bolesław the Pious retook the estates of Kalisz which once had been ruled by their father, the late Duke Władysław Odonic. The local nobility supported them as the true heirs to those lands. Bolesław decided to avoid a fight and renounced all his Greater Poland lands. He tried to retain some districts, such as Santok and Międzyrzecz, but in 1247 the Dukes of Greater Poland ultimately forced Bolesław to resign all his rights to lands in Greater Poland.

== First division of Lower Silesia ==
When in 1242, Bolesław next oldest brother, Mieszko, died suddenly without leaving an heir, his Lubusz estates reverted to Bolesław and his younger brothers became co-rulers of the Lower Silesian lands. When his brother Henry III the White came of age in 1247, however, he and his younger brothers revolted against Bolesław and even were able to imprison him shortly thereafter.

To regain freedom, Bolesław signed an agreement with Henry III, dividing the Lower Silesian lands of Legnica and Wrocław. To avoid further fragmentation, the two pledged to offer hospitality to their minor brothers, Bolesław to Konrad I, and Henry to Władysław. Bolesław, as the eldest, got first choice of the districts, and he chose the Legnica estates, possibly because of the gold discovery in the Kaczawa and Wierzbiak Rivers.

== Duke of Legnica ==
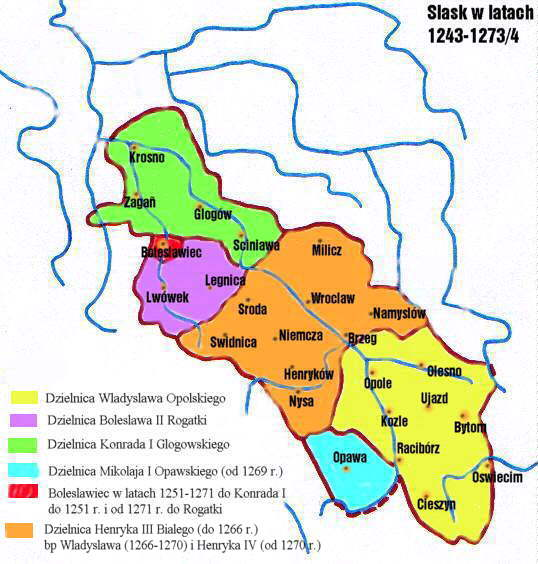
Lower Silesian duchies of Wrocław (orange), Legnica (violet) and Głogów (green) from 1251

Bolesław soon regretted his choice and tried to recover Wrocław. Henry III refused to surrender his new duchy, and war was inevitable. Both began preparing for battle, but didn't have adequate funds. Bolesław sought allies among the Ascanian relatives of his wife Hedwig, daughter of Count Henry I of Anhalt. Archbishop Wilbrand of Magdeburg contributed funds after Bolesław sold half of Lubusz Land to him.

The German aid only gave Bolesław a temporary advantage in the war against his brother. In 1249, his younger brother and co-ruler, Konrad I, unexpectedly returned to the country (after concluding his studies in Paris). Bolesław proposed him as Bishop of Passau; however, Konrad refused and began to press his own claims in Silesia. Bolesław opposed him, and the young prince took refuge at the court of the Dukes of Greater Poland, Bolesław's long-time enemy. Shortly after, Konrad reinforced his bonds with Duke Przemysł I after a double marriage: the Duke of Greater Poland married Konrad's sister Elizabeth, and Konrad married Duke Przemysł's sister, Salome.

The final clash occurred two years later, when Bolesław was defeated by the combined forces of Przemysł I and Henry III the White, who supported Konrad. In 1251, Bolesław finally agreed to divide his own lands and ceded the Duchy of Głogów to Konrad. Bolesław only retained the small district of Legnica proper.

== Conflict with the bishop of Wrocław ==
It took Bolesław another two years and the help of his brother Henry III to recover full authority over his principality. Bolesław made some agreements with the other Piast dukes, especially with the princes of Greater Poland and with Bishop Thomas I of Wrocław. However, Bolesław never forgave the bishop for his tendency to support the younger princes.

Bolesław's conflict with the Bishop of Wrocław reached a more critical point in 1257, when Bolesław incarcerated the bishop at Wleń Castle. Bolesław was immediately excommunicated. His brothers quickly intervened and negotiated a settlement. In 1261, Bolesław paid a large tribute and paid public penance at the gates of Wrocław Cathedral. He had been excommunicated twice before, in 1248 and 1249, and a call had been issued to the neighboring nobility to a crusade against him. He was later forgiven by the Bishop, and both of the previous excommunications were rescinded.

Bolesław also remained in hostile relations with his brother, Duke Konrad of Głogów. In 1257, Konrad kidnapped Bolesław from his castle in Legnica. The duke regained his freedom a few months later. In 1271, Bolesław took the town of Bolesławiec, near Bóbr.

== Final years ==
In the 1270s, Bolesław gave more and more power to his adolescent sons. In 1273, he granted the Duchy of Jawor to his oldest son Henry V and it seemed that Bolesław had resigned from adventurous politics. Nevertheless, in 1277, he signed an alliance with King Rudolf I of Germany, straining the alliance of the other Piast dukes with rival King Ottokar II of Bohemia. At Rudolph's insistence, Bolesław kidnapped Ottokar's ally, Duke Henry IV of Wrocław, Bolesław's nephew, and demanded one-third of Wrocław after the death of his uncle Władysław, Bolesław's youngest brother, in 1270. Henry IV was imprisoned in Legnica Castle.

A coalition was formed between Ottokar II, Duke Henry III of Głogów, and Duke Przemysł II of Greater Poland, but it soon failed: while Bolesław's forces were greatly outnumbered at the bloody battle of Stolec, his son Henry V turned the tide and the allied dukes were defeated. A settlement was reached; Henry IV was freed and Bolesław was given one-third of the Duchy of Środa Śląska.

Bolesław II died between 26 and 31 December 1278 and was buried at the Dominican monastery of his Legnica residence. His three sons, Henry V the Fat, Bolko I and Bernhard, inherited his lands.

== Marriages and children ==
In 1242, Bolesław married Hedwig (d. 21 December 1259), daughter of Henry I, Count of Anhalt. They had seven children:

1. Agnes (born c. 1243/1250 – died 13 March 1265, buried Stuttgart Stiftskirche), married c. 1260/1264 to Count Ulrich I of Württemberg;
2. Henry V, Duke of Legnica (born c. 1248 – died 22 February 1296);
3. Hedwig (Jadwiga) (born c. 1250/1255 – died aft. 1280), married c. 1265/1270 to Duke Konrad II of Masovia;
4. Bolko I the Strict (born c. 1252/1256 – died Krzeszów, 9 November 1301, buried Krzeszów Abbey);
5. Bernhard (born c. 1253/1257 – died 25 April 1286, buried Dominican Monastery, Legnica);
6. Konrad (d. young);
7. Katharina (d. 25 April 1286, buried in the Dominican Monastery, Legnica).

In 1261, Bolesław married secondly Euphemia (also called Alenta or Iolanta or Adelheid) (born c. 1245 - died c. 15 February 1309), daughter of Sambor II, Duke of Pomerania.

Around 1270, he began living with his mistress, Sophia of Dyhrn. They had a son, Jarosław, who died in infancy. Gravely ill and deeply offended by her husband's affair, Euphemia fled to her homeland in Pomerania in 1275. Their marriage was considered annulled. In 1277, Bolesław finally married his mistress, but the union lasted only a few months until the Duke's death in 1278. Euphemia returned to Silesia after Bolesław's death.

== Bibliography ==
- Davies, Norman (1982). God's Playground: A History of Poland. Vol. I: The Origins to 1795. Columbia University Press.
- Bolesław II Rogatka (Łysy, Okrutny, Srogi, Cudaczny)
- Gabriela Bortacka (9 October 2021), Diabeł w skórze Piasta. Kim był Bolesław Rogatka (in Polish), Ciekawostki Historyczne.pl / onet.pl

Bolesław II the Horned House of Piast Born: c. 1220–1225 Died: December 1278
| Preceded by Henry II the Pious | High Duke of Poland; 1241 | Succeeded by Konrad I of Masovia |
| Preceded by Henry II the Pious | Duke of Silesia (Wrocław); 1241 – 1248 | Succeeded by Henry III the White and Władysław |
| Preceded by Henry II the Pious | Duke of Greater Poland (only in the Southwest); 1241 – 1247 | Succeeded by Przemysł I and Bolesław the Pious |
| Preceded by new creation | Duke of Legnica with Konrad until 1251; 1248 – 1278 | Succeeded by Henry V |
