= Bernard the Lightsome =

- Duke of Lwówek, Jawor
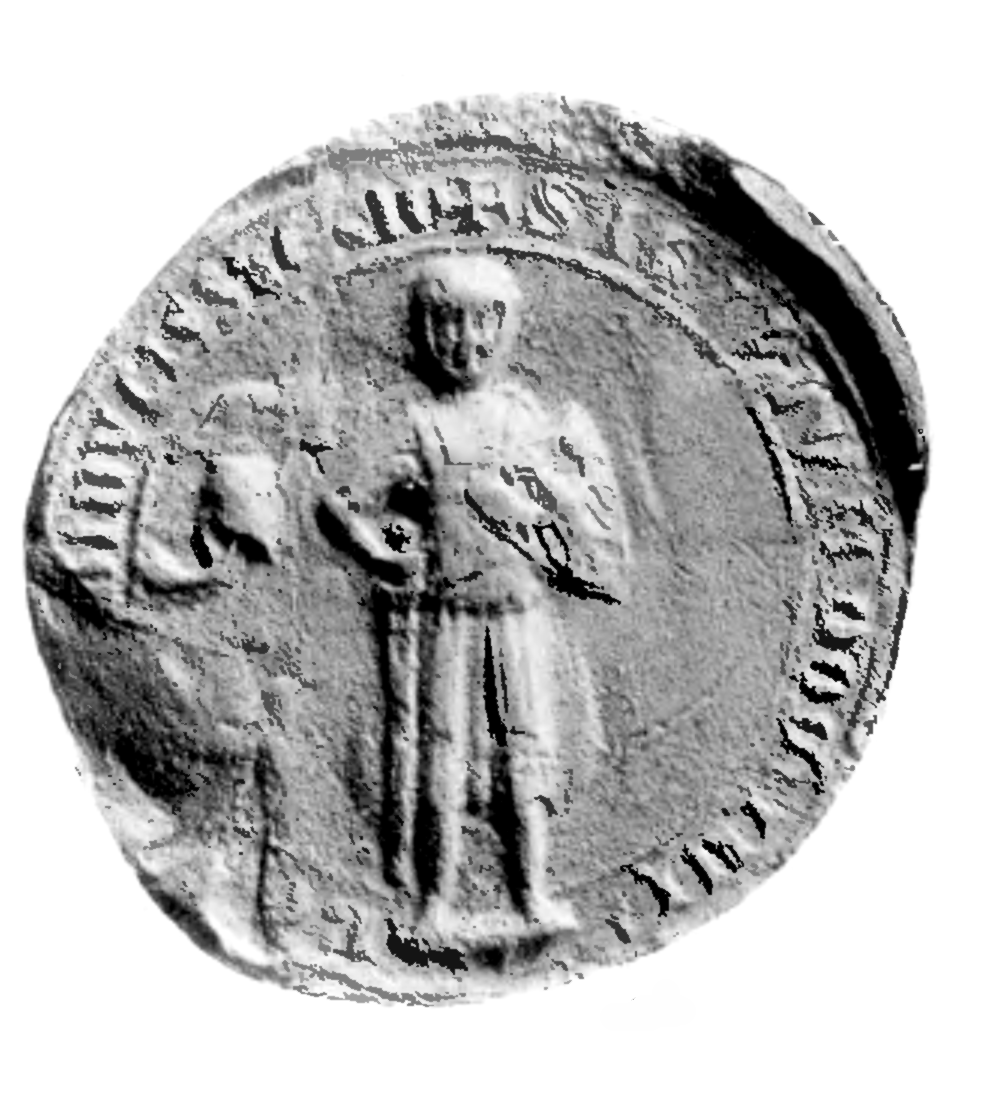
- Born: 1253 or 1257
- Died: 25 April 1286
- Noble family: Silesian Piasts
- Father: Bolesław II the Bald
- Mother: Hedwig of Anhalt

Bernard the Lightsome (also known as of Lwówek; Polish: Bernard Zwinny or Lwówecki; 1253 or 1257 – 25 April 1286) was a Duke of Lwówek (Löwenberg) since 1278 (with his brother until 1281) and Jawor (Jauer) during 1278–1281 (as a co-ruler of his brother).

He was the third son of Bolesław II the Bald, Duke of Legnica by his first wife Hedwig, daughter of Henry I, Count of Anhalt. It is not known when exactly he was born but had to happen before 1258, because seven years later he was sent to Wrocław by his father with the Tithe to the Bishop Thomas.

== Life ==
Bernard actively supported the policy of his father Bolesław II and his brothers, Henry V the Fat and Bolko I the Strict (for example, he participated in the victorious Battle of Stolec). After the death of his father in 1278, Henry V gave his younger brothers Bernard and Bolko I the Duchies of Lwówek (Löwenberg) and Jawor as co-rulers. However, his independent rule began only three years later, in 1281, when he and Bolko made the division of their domains and Bernard received Lwówek. Little is known about this period in Bernard's life, and the only certain fact was (according to the chronicles), that he promoted and protected knights, a common practice among medieval princes. This also maybe justified the nickname "Zwinny" (Lightsome, Clever) given to him by contemporary sources. Lwówek had a special gratitude to him after he supported the Silesian monastery of the Knights Hospitaller, where he was a generous benefactor, giving them among other things in 1281, the village of Cieplice.

Bernard died unmarried and childless in 1286. He was buried in the Dominican church in Legnica, and his lands were inherited by his brother Bolko.

Preceded by Henry V the Fat	Duke of Lwówek with Bolko I (until 1281); 1278–1286	Succeeded by Bolko I the Strict
Preceded by Henry V the Fat	Duke of Jawor with Bolko I 1278–1281	Succeeded by Bolko I the Strict
