= Wierzbiak =

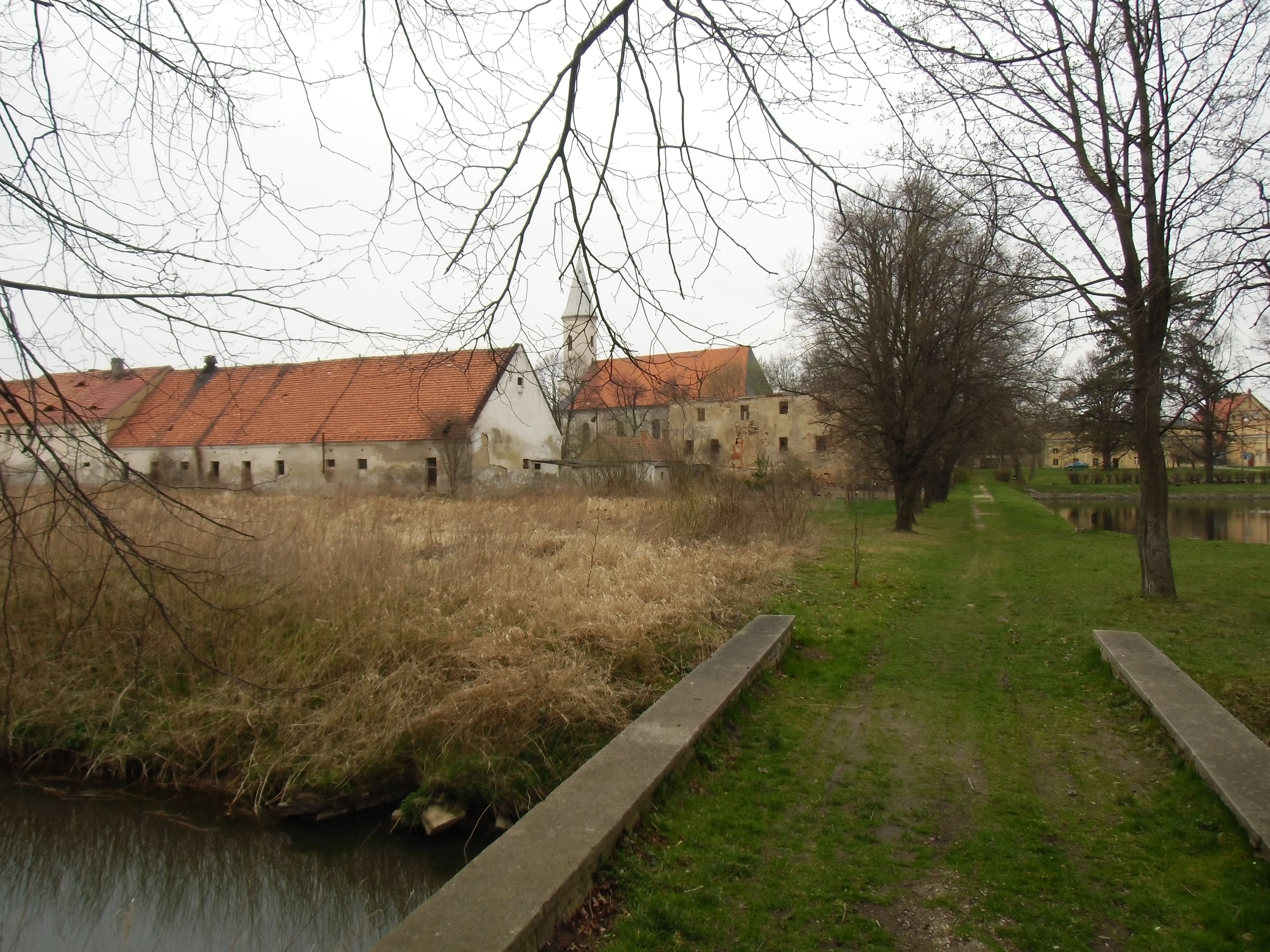
- The bridge over the Wierzbiak in the town of Mściwojów

Location
- Country: Poland
- Voivodeship: Lower Silesian

Physical characteristics
- Source
  - location: northwest of Żółkiewka, Świdnica County
  - coordinates: 50°59′04″N 16°17′39″E
- Mouth: Kaczawa
  - location: east of Pątnów Legnicki, Legnica County
  - coordinates: 51°14′37″N 16°14′34″E
- Length: 46 km (29 mi)

Basin features
- Progression: Kaczawa→ Oder→ Baltic Sea

Wierzbiak is a river of Poland, a tributary of the Kaczawa northeast of Legnica.
