= Of Pomerania =

of Pomerania (Polish: Pomorski, Pomorska, Danish: af Pommern, German: von Pommern) may be a cognomen of the following persons:

- Adalbert of Pomerania (c. 1124–1162)
- Anna of Pomerania (1590-1660)
- Anna of Pomerania, Duchess of Lubin (1492-1550)
- Casimir of Pomerania, several persons
- Catherine of Pomerania, Countess Palatine of Neumarkt (1390-1426)
- Clara Maria of Pomerania-Barth (1574-1623)
- Dobrosława of Pomerania
- Elizabeth of Pomerania (c. 1347 – 1393), the fourth and last wife of Charles IV, Holy Roman Emperor and King of Bohemia
- Elisabeth Magdalena of Pomerania (1580-1649)
- Euphemia of Pomerania (1285-1330), Queen of Denmark as the spouse of King Christopher II
- Erik of Pomerania (1381-1459), King of Denmark, Norway, and Sweden
- Jadwiga of Pomerania
- Margaret of Pomerania (several persons)
- Sophie of Pomerania (disambiguation)
  - Sophie of Pomerania (1498–1568), Queen of Denmark and Norway as the spouse of Frederick I
  - Sophie of Pomerania, Duchess of Pomerania (1435-1497)
  - Sophie of Pomerania, Duchess of Mecklenburg (1460-1504)
  - Sophie of Pomerania (Gotland) (died 1408)

== See also ==
- List of Pomeranian duchies and dukes
- Pomorski
