= John II of Legnica =

John II
- Duke of Legnica
- Coat-of-arms of Silesian Piasts
- Born: 1477
- Died: 6 March 1495 (aged 17–18)
- Noble family: Silesian Piasts
- Father: Frederick I of Legnica
- Mother: Ludmila of Poděbrady

John II of Legnica (Polish: Jan II Legnicki) (1477 – 6 March 1495) was a Duke of Legnica since 1488 until his death (with his brothers as co-ruler).

He was the eldest son of Frederick I, Duke of Chojnów-Oława-Legnica-Brzeg-Lubin, by his wife Ludmila, daughter of George of Poděbrady, King of Bohemia.

== Life ==
After the death of his father in 1488, John II and his younger brothers Frederick I and George I succeeded him in Legnica, Chojnów and Lubin. Because all were minors, the regency of the Duchies was held by their mother, the Dowager Duchess Ludmila, who received from her late husband Brzeg and Oława as dower to rule until her own death.

John II died before reached adulthood, and for this he never married or had children. He was succeeded by his brothers, who remained under the regency of their mother for another three years, until 1498.

Preceded by Frederick I	Duke of Legnica; 1488–1495 with Frederick II; George I	Succeeded by Frederick II; George I
