= Ludmila of Poděbrady =

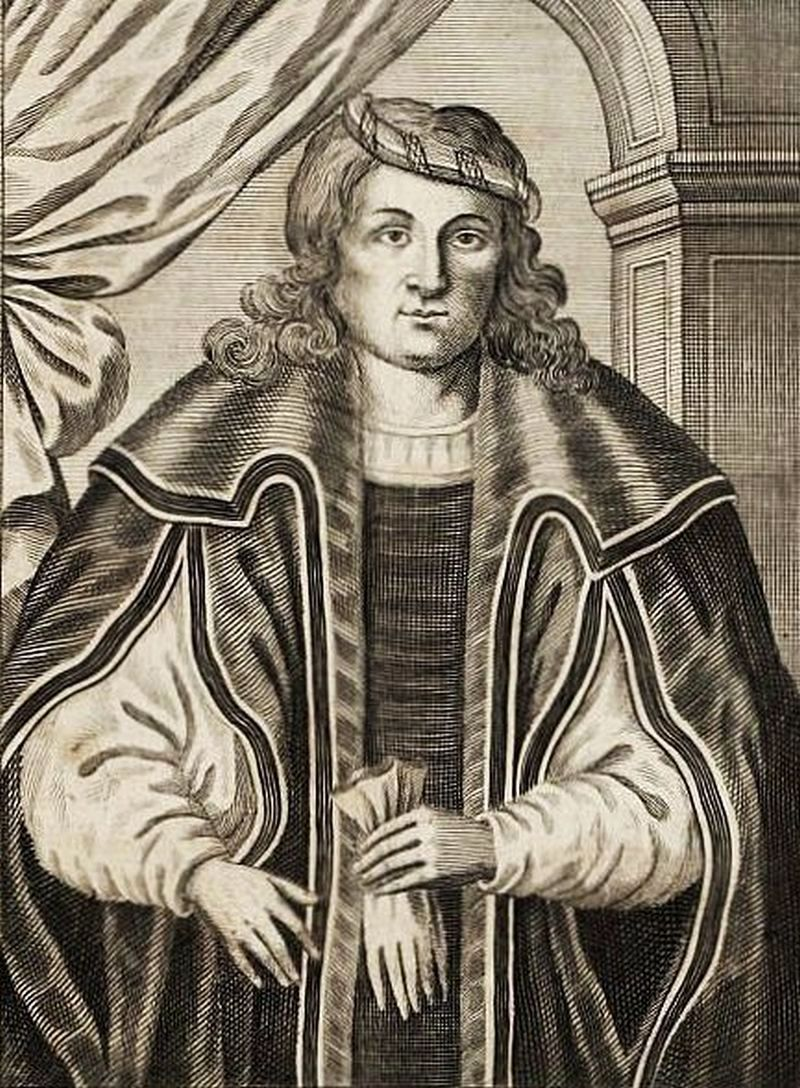
- Ludmila of Poděbrady, engraving by Bartholomäus Strachowsky, 1733
- Born: 16 October 1456
- Died: 20 January 1503 (aged 46); Legnica
- Noble family: House of Poděbrady
- Spouse: Frederick I of Legnica
- Father: George of Poděbrady
- Mother: Johana of Rožmitál

Ludmila of Poděbrady Polish: Ludmiła Podiebrad; (16 October 1456 – Legnica, 20 January 1503) was a member of the House of Poděbrady and by marriage Duchess of Chojnów-Oława-Legnica-Brzeg-Lubin.

She was the youngest daughter of George of Poděbrady (who was elected King of Bohemia in 1458) and his second wife, Johana of Rožmitál (Johanka z Rožmitálu). She was named after her maternal grandmother, Ludmila Bawor of Strakonicz.

== Life ==
In 1460 Ludmila was betrothed to George, only son and heir of Duke Louis IX, Duke of Bavaria-Landshut. This marriage would have gained King George an ally in his efforts to obtain the German throne.

However, the change of the political plans of George forced him in 1461 to dissolve Ludmila's betrothal with the Bavarian prince and engaged her with the Hungarian magnate Laurence of Ilok. The Bohemian King wanted to win the Hungarian magnates to the cause of Matthias Corvinus (who recently had married with one of his eldest twin daughters, Katharina) and simultaneously tried to gain his own opportunity of became the ruler of Hungary. In 1464, after Katharina's death, the relations between the Kings of Hungary and Bohemia become unfriendly. In this situation, George reassumed the idea of a marriage between Ludmila and the heir of Bavaria-Landshut. This engagement was broken by 1468, when King George found himself in political isolation. Then, he tried to arrange a marriage between Ludmila and the young Prince Vladislaus Jagiellon (eldest son of King Casimir IV of Poland) but this plan never prospered. After King George's death in 1471, his widow proposed Prince Vladislaus as his successor. Shortly after, the Polish prince became in King Vladislaus II of Bohemia, and after succeeded Matthias Corvinus in 1490, he also reigned as King of Hungary.

On 5 September 1474 Ludmila married with Duke Frederick I of Legnica. In 1475 along with her husband, she went on a pilgrimage to Rome for the Jubilee year. Ludmila bore her husband three sons: John II, Frederick II and George I.

After the death of her husband (9 May 1488) Ludmila assumed the regency on behalf of her minor sons in the Duchies of Chojnów, Legnica and Lubin, but not in Brzeg and Oława, who were assigned to her in Frederick I's will as her dower, and in consequence, they are under Ludmila's direct sovereignty for her life.

Ludmila's regency ended in 1498, when her eldest surviving son, Frederick II (John II had already died in 1495 still underage) attained his majority and assumed the government and the guardianship of his youngest brother George I by himself. Ludmila died five years later, and the Duchy of Brzeg-Oława was taken by her sons, who divided their domains between them two years later, in 1505.

Ludmila of Poděbrady House of Poděbrady Born: 16 October 1456 Died: 20 January 1503
Preceded by Frederick I	Duchess of Brzeg and Oława; 1488–1503	Succeeded by Frederick II and George I
