= Frederick I of Liegnitz =

Polish nobleman

- Duke of Chojnów. Strzelin, Oława, Legnica, Brzeg
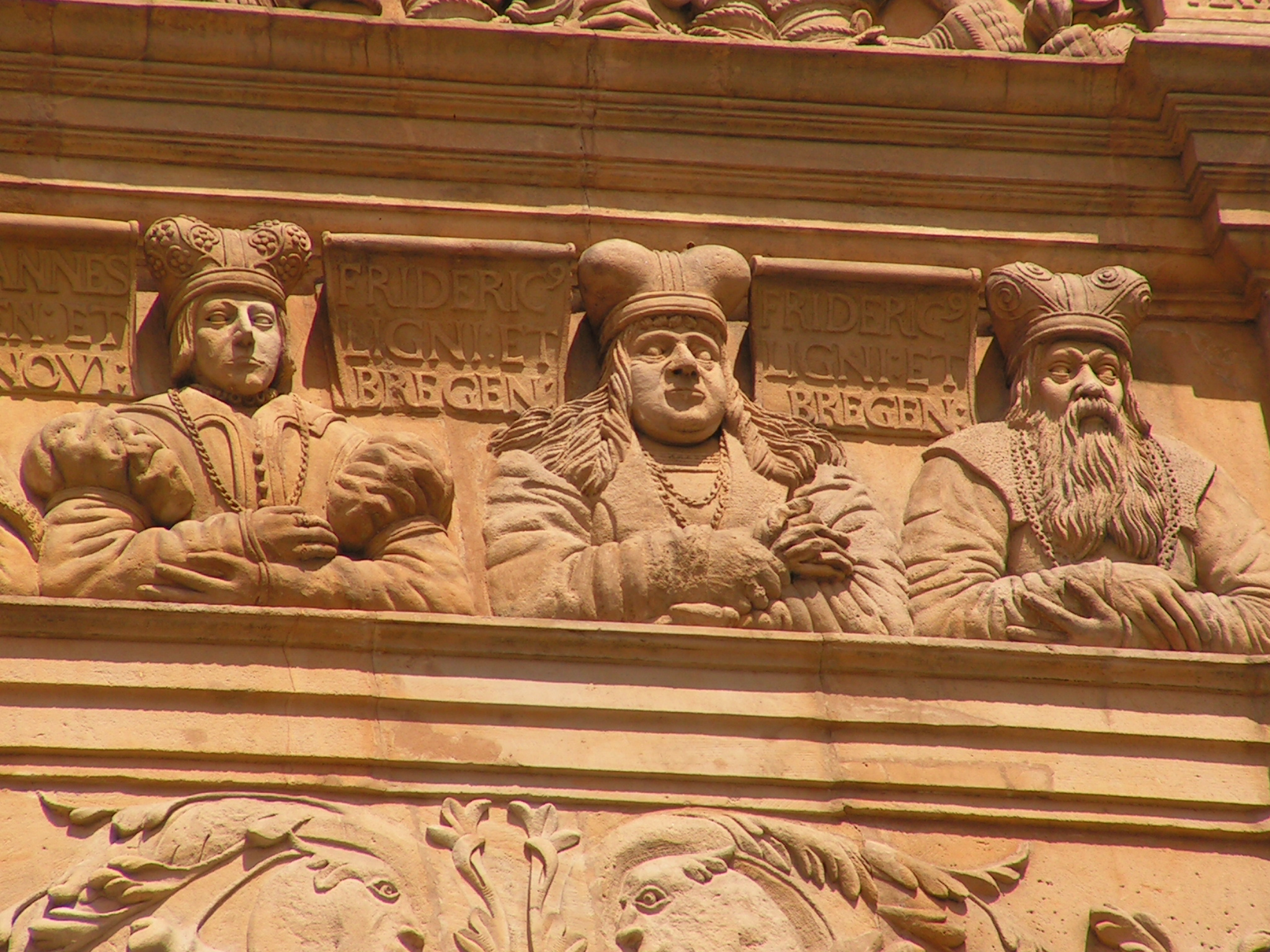
- John I, Frederick I, Frederick II.
- Born: 3 May 1446; Brzeg
- Died: 9 May 1488 (aged 42); Legnica
- Noble family: Silesian Piasts
- Spouse: Ludmila of Poděbrady
- Issue: John II of Legnica; Frederick II of Legnica; George I of Brieg
- Father: John I of Lüben
- Mother: Hedwig of Brzeg

Frederick I of Liegnitz (3 May 1446 – 9 May 1488), was a Duke of Chojnów and Strzelin from 1453, of Oława and Legnica from 1454, of Brzeg from 1481 and of Lubin from 1482.

== Biography ==
Frederick was born in Brzeg. He was the only son of John I, Duke of Lubin, by his wife Hedwig, daughter of Ludwik II of Brzeg.

The successive deaths of his uncle Henry X (in 1452) and his own father (in 1453) left Frederick I as the last male representative of the Legnica-Brzeg branch of the Piast dynasty. The seven-year-old prince succeeded John I in Chojnow and Strzelin under the regency of his mother, the Dowager Duchess Hedwig. One year later (1454), Frederick I inherited Olava and Niemcza after the death of his paternal grandmother Margareta of Opole; shortly after, he also received Legnica from the Kingdom of Bohemia. The regency of Dowager Duchess Hedwig ended in 1466, when Frederick I was formally proclaimed an adult and was able to rule by himself. Throughout his reign he focused on the consolidation of his dynasty and the recovery of all the lands lost by his predecessors.

In 1481 Frederick I purchased Brzeg from the Dukes of Opole, and one year later (1482) he did the same with Lubin, then in hands of the Dukes of Głogów. In 1488 he also recovered the towns of Byczyna, Wołczyn and Kluczbork.

He died at Legnica in 1488.

== Marriage and issue ==
On 5 September 1474, Frederick I married Ludmila, daughter of George of Poděbrady, King of Bohemia. They had three sons:

- John II (1477 – 6 March 1495).
- Frederick II (12 February 1480 – 17 September 1547).
- George I (1481/83 – 30 May 1521).

In his will, he left his wife Brzeg and Olava as widow's land, which were ruled by her until her own death.

Frederick I of Liegnitz House of Piast Born: 3 May 1446 Died: 9 May 1488
Preceded by Jan I	Duke of Chojnów; 1453–1488	Succeeded by John II; Frederick II; George I
Preceded by Jan II the Mad	Duke of Lubin; 1482–1488	Succeeded by John II; Frederick II; George I
Preceded by Direct Sovereignty of the Kingdom of Bohemia last holder Elisabeth	Duke of Legnica; 1454–1488	Succeeded by John II; Frederick II; George I
Preceded by Margareta	Duke of Oława; 1454–1488	Succeeded by Ludmila
Preceded by Jan II the Good	Duke of Brzeg; 1481–1488	Succeeded by Ludmila
