= Pomorski =

Pomorski means Pomeranian in Polish. It is a masculine Polish-language surname with the feminine counterpart being Pomorska. Notable people with the name include:

== Surname ==
- Daniel Pomorski, musician from Polish rock band Happysad
- Edward Pomorski (1901–1995), the last Minister Plenipotentiary of the Polish Government-in-Exile
- Jerzy Mikułowski Pomorski (1937–2020), Polish sociologist
- John Pomorski (1905–1977), American baseball pitcher

== See also ==
- Pomorska (disambiguation)
- of Pomerania
