= George I of Brieg =

George I
- Duke of Legnica, Brzeg
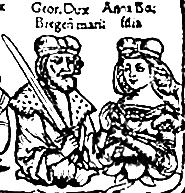
- George I of Brzeg and Anna of Pomerania
- Born: 1481/83
- Died: 30 May 1521
- Noble family: Silesian Piasts
- Spouse: Anna of Pomerania
- Father: Frederick I of Legnica
- Mother: Ludmila of Poděbrady

George I, Duke of Brieg (Brzeg) (Polish: Jerzy I brzeski; 1481 or 1483 – 30 May 1521), was Duke of Legnica from 1488 to 1505 (with his brother as co-ruler) and of Brzeg from 1505 to his death. He was a member of the Legnica-Brzeg branch of the Piast dynasty.

He was the third and youngest son of Frederick I, Duke of Chojnów-Oława-Legnica-Brzeg-Lubin, by his wife Ludmila, daughter of George of Poděbrady, King of Bohemia.

== Life ==
After the death of his father in 1488, George I and his two older brothers John II and Frederick II succeeded him in Legnica, Chojnów and Lubin; but because all were minors, the regency was held by their mother, the Dowager Duchess Ludmila, who received from her late husband Brzeg and Oława as dower until her death. John II died in 1495 still under the regency of Ludmila; George I and his brother Frederick II began their personal reign only three years later, in 1498.

Dowager Duchess Ludmila died in 1503 and their domains of Brzeg and Oława were inherited by his sons, who continued as co-rulers for another two years, until 1505, when they finally decided to make the division of their lands. George I received Brzeg and Lubin.

On 9 June 1516 George I married Anna (b. 1492 – d. 25 April 1550), daughter of Bogislaw X, Duke of Pomerania. They had no children and for this, on his death George I was succeeded by his brother Frederick II only in Brzeg, because Lubin was granted to Dowager Duchess Anna as dower.

George had a contentious relationship with the Catholic Church, largely due to a series of disputes about taxes which lasted from 1500-1514. When George died in 1521, Wrocław Cathedral initially denied him a Christian burial before his brother Friedrich intervened.

Preceded by Frederick I	Duke of Legnica with John II (until 1495) and Frederick II; 1488–1505	Succeeded by Frederick II
Preceded by Ludmila	Duke of Brzeg with Frederick II (until 1505); 1503–1521	Succeeded by Frederick II
Preceded by new creation	Duke of Lubin; 1505–1521	Succeeded by Anna
