= Oswald Lange =

German-American aerospace engineer

Oswald Hermann Lange
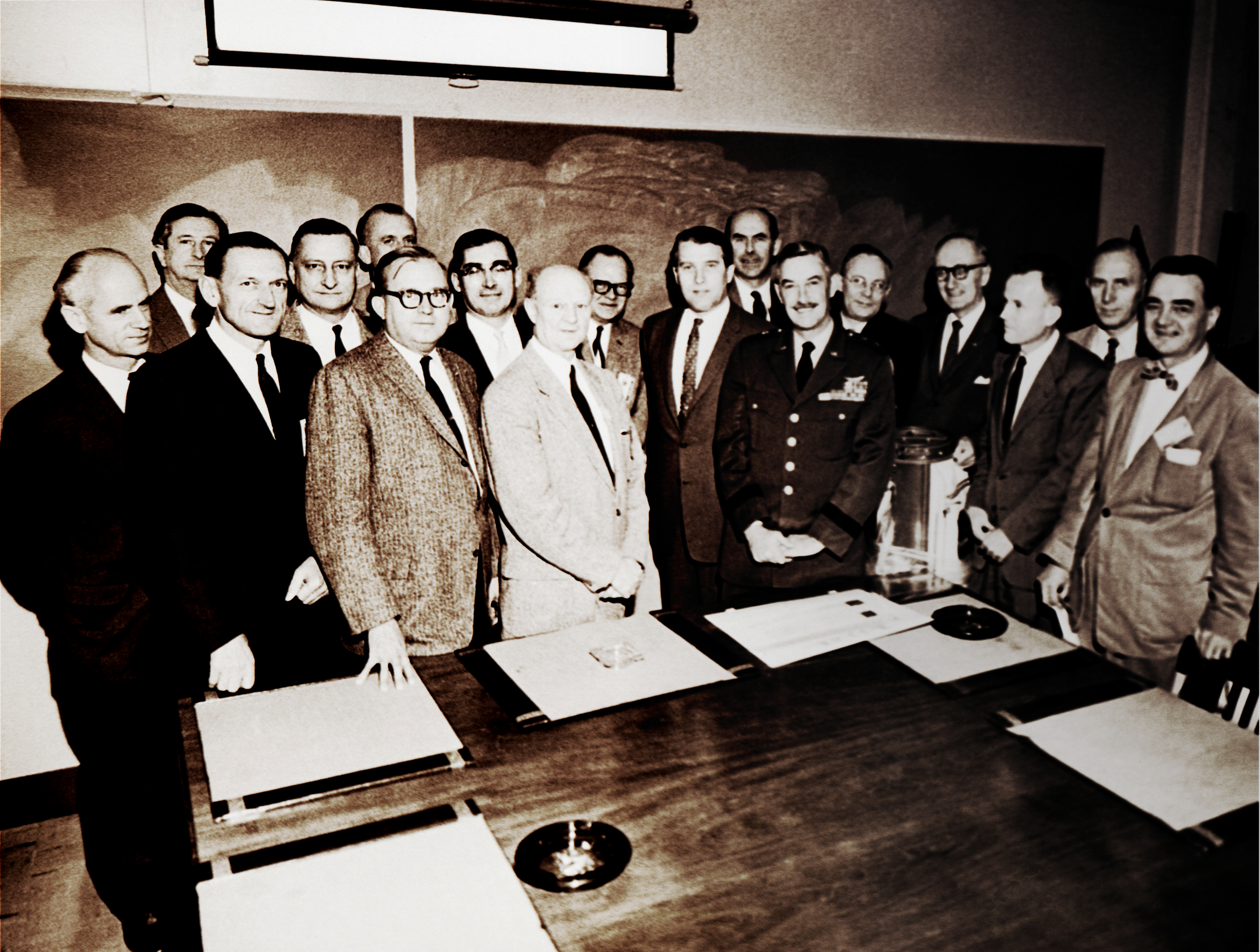
- VonBraunTeam1959.
- Born: June 1, 1912; Haynau, Germany
- Died: February 20, 2000 (aged 87); Savannah, Georgia, United States
- Education: Technische Universität Berlin
- Scientific career
- Fields: Mathematics, Engineering
- Workplaces: Peenemünde; Royal Aircraft Establishment; Glenn L. Martin Company

Oswald Hermann Lange (June 1, 1912 – February 20, 2000) was a German-American aerospace engineer and member of the "von Braun rocket group". He contributed to early military aerospace projects, including the V-2 and Wasserfall, and eventually became project director of Saturn V.

== Biography ==
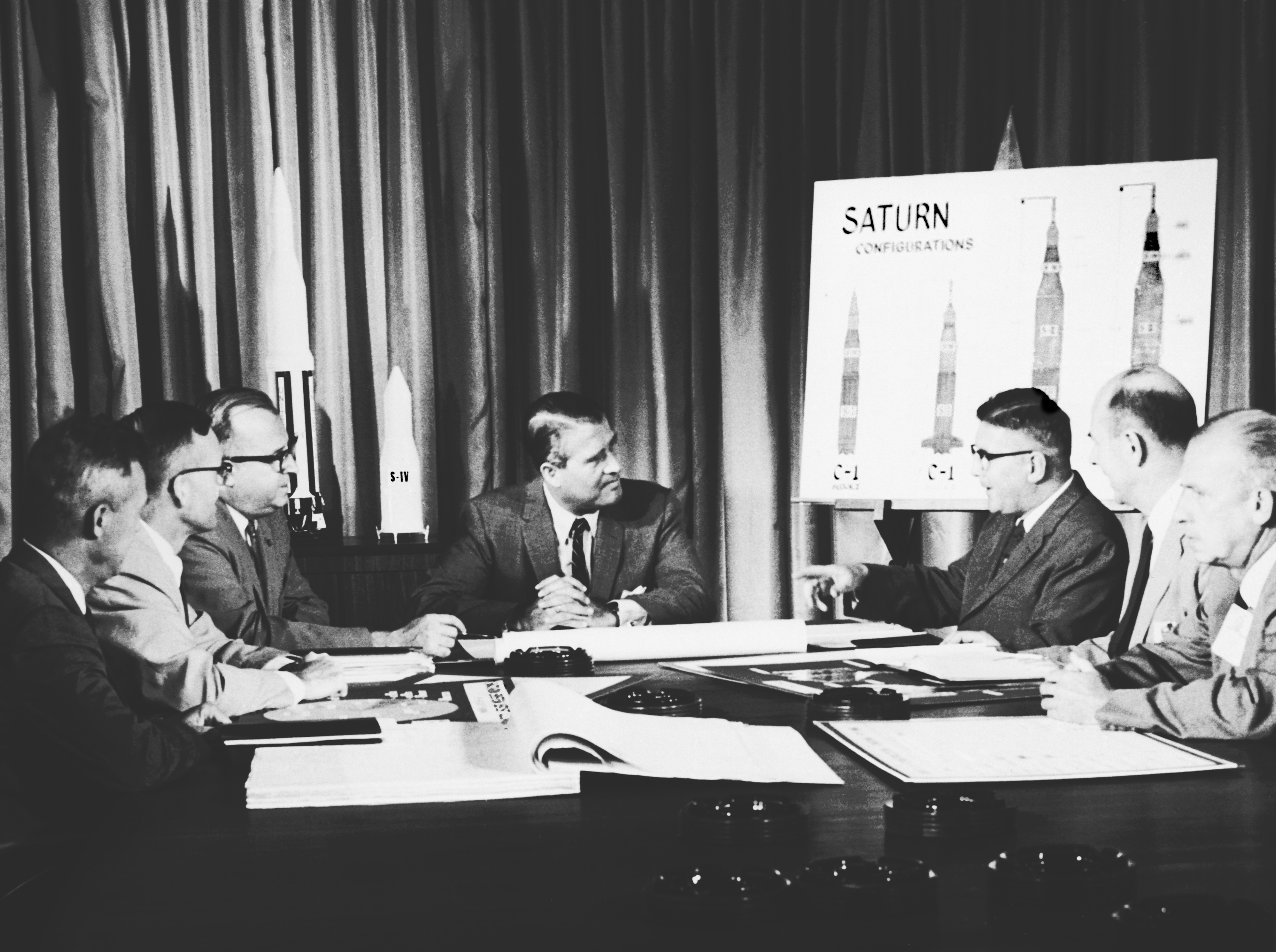
Von Braun's rocket team in 1961. Lange is second from the right.

Lange earned his master's degree from the University of Breslau and PhD from the Technische Hochschule in Charlottenburg (now Technische Universität Berlin). He worked at Peenemünde from 1940 to 1945 on guidance and control aspects of the V-2 ballistic missile and the Wasserfall surface-to-air missile. After World War II, he worked at the Royal Aircraft Establishment (1947), but emigrated to the US in 1954, working briefly at Martin Aircraft. In 1959, he was naturalized as a US citizen and became head of the Saturn project office. He retired in 1977.
