= Pomorska =

Pomorska is a Polish feminine adjective literally meraning "Pomeranian", "from Pomerania", "of Pomerania". It may refer to:

- Feminine form of the Polish surname Pomorski
- Pomorska Street, Bydgoszcz, Poland
- Pomorska Museum, at Pomorska Street, Kraków, Poland
- Pomorska Wieś, village in Poland
