= Sophie of Pomerania (disambiguation) =

Sophie of Pomerania (1498–1568), daughter of Bogislaw X, Duke of Pomerania; wife of Frederick I of Denmark.

Sophie of Pomerania may also refer to:

- Sophie of Pomerania-Wolgast-Rügen (d. 1406), daughter of Wartislaw VI, Duke of Pomerania-Wolgast-Rügen; wife of Henry the Mild, Duke of Brunswick-Lüneburg
- Sophie of Pomerania-Rügen (d. aft. 1453), daughter of Wartislaw VII, Duke of Pomerania-Rügen; wife of William, Lord of Werle
- Sophie of Pomerania-Wolgast (d. bef. 1408), daughter of Bogislav IV, Duke of Pomerania-Wolgast; wife of Eric of Mecklenburg, Lord of Gotland
- Sophie of Pomerania-Stolp (1435-1494/97), daughter of Bogislaw VIII, Duke of Pomerania-Stolp; wife of Eric II, Duke of Pomerania-Wolgast
- Sophie of Pomerania-Stettin (1460–1504), daughter of Eric II, Duke of Pomerania-Wolgast; wife of Magnus II, Duke of Mecklenburg
- Sophie Hedwig of Pomerania (1588–1591), daughter of Bogislaw XIII, Duke of Pomerania-Stettin; died young
- Sophia (of Arnstein?) (?-?), wife of Wartislaw III, Duke of Pomerania-Demmin
- Sophie of Holstein (d. aft. 1451), wife of Bogislaw VIII, Duke of Pomerania-Stolp
- Sophie of Werle (1329–1364), wife of Barnim IV, Duke of Pomerania-Wolgast-Rügen
- Sophie of Saxe-Lauenburg (1395–1462), wife of Wartislaw IX, Duke of Pomerania-Wolgast
- Sophie of Schleswig-Holstein-Sonderburg (1579–1618), wife of Philip II, Duke of Pomerania-Barth
- Sophie of Saxony (1587–1635), wife of Francis I, Duke of Pomerania-Barth
