= Margaret of Pomerania =

Margaret of Pomerania can refer to:

- Margaret Sambiria (1230–1282), Queen of Denmark by marriage to King Christopher I
- Margaret of Pomerania (died 1407/1410), wife of Ernest, Duke of Austria
- Margaret of Pomerania (1518–1569), wife of Ernest III, Duke of Brunswick-Grubenhagen
