= Edward Pomorski =

Edward Pomorski (29 March 1901 - 2 January 1995) was the last Minister Plenipotentiary of the Polish Government-in-Exile, in Belgium from 11 December 1970 to 31 December 1988. He was Commander of the Polish Resistance P.O.W.N. (Polish Organization of Fight for Independence) in Belgium and the Netherlands (1940–1945).

== Early life ==
Pomorski was born on March 29, 1901, in Węgleszyn (near Kielce) while Poland was part of Imperial Russia. In 1919, he served as a volunteer for several months in the newly formed Polish Army during the Polish-Soviet war of 1919–1921, and fought in the Battle of Warsaw. Then he returned to school in Koński to complete his secondary education. He studied Polish philology at the Jagellonian University of Kraków (1921–1926). He started to work on his doctoral thesis, his interests centered on the literature of the Polish Renaissance but in 1927, he was called back to complete his military service that was interrupted in 1919: he reached the grade of second lieutenant. He won a fellowship to the University of Dijon (France). where he learned French. In July 1929, he married Jadwiga Górska, a philologist;they began teaching in secondary schools in Katowice and Jędrzejów for 2 years until their departure for France in 1932.

Pomorski arrived with a diplomatic passport to Monceau (Central France) to teach Polish youth and provide social and cultural support to the Polish communities of miners, workers and teachers. After 5 years, he was transferred to Liège, Belgium. He registered at the Liėge University for a degree in Consular and Diplomatic Affairs (1937-1939), however, the war interrupted that project.

== Wartime ==
When the war broke out in Poland, and Belgium remained neutral, Pomorski and his wife recruited volunteers for the Allied Forces assembling in France: 2000 men were sent, almost all recruited among miners and steel workers. In 1941, the Polish resistance in France, known as P.O.W.N.(Polska Organizacja Walki o Niepodległość), which translates to the Polish Organization of Fight for Independence contacted Pomorski who was already circulating a clandestine bulletin (Marsz), The March. P.O.W.N. was a non-political military organization under the orders of General Sikorski and the Polish Government-in-Exile in London. Pomorski was named Commander for Belgium and the Netherlands with "nom de Guerre" Bolesław; he had 500 members. The objectives set by P.O.W.N. were the same for the three countries: -gather information on the movement of troops and activities around industrial sites,- organize escape routes for fallen pilots and prisoners, and interfere with the transport of reinforcements in preparation for D-Day activities, - identify sites for the parachuting of technicians and matėriel. Pomorski crossed the green border to France many times and thanks to the presence of Poles on both sides of the border and through their joint efforts, P.O.W.N. identified 182 underground launchpads for missiles V1 and V2 (all directed towards London) of which 163 were destroyed by Allies. Another line of such launchpads was discovered along the Belgian-Dutch border. Sabotage technicians were sent from London but their activities were called off, leaving Liège exposed to V1 missiles for three months while the Allies were blocked in the Ardennes. During the war years, Pomorski supported his family by teaching Russian in a business school in Liège, Belgium.

== Postwar years ==
As Belgium was liberated in September 1944, Pomorski, as sole representative of the Polish emigration, took charge of the consulate in Brussels. P.O.W.N. enlisted volunteers to join the Polish Military Forces in London. On October 5, 1944, 800 men left Belgium. As both diplomats arrived from London, Pomorski became Cultural Attachė and nominated School Inspector by the Government in exile. This meant rebuilding a network of Polish schools, but also implementing a rudimentary schooling system inside the deportation camps in Germany where many families, unwilling to return to Poland, were waiting for a chance to emigrate.

The recognition of Communist Poland in 1947 left Pomorski and his family in a precarious position. The Warsaw government put pressure on Pomorski to ensure that, should he stay with them, he would use his influential position within the emigration to promote their ideology. If not, he would not be allowed to return to Poland. So, Pomorski reworked his thesis, and obtained his doctorate in Slavic History and Literature from the Free University of Brussels (1951). Over the next 40 years, he developed a translation office where he was translating himself in 12 languages and several dialects. He was elected by his peers president of the Order of Translators of Belgium.

== Social, educational, political involvement ==
After the phase of armed resistance, P.O.W.N. had to redefine its objectives since it was originally created as a military organization. P.O.W.N. designated a General Committee of Fight for Independence on May 14, 1945, with Pomorski as commander for 6 months. It was later transformed into ==the Union of Poles in Belgium== (Związek Polaków w Belgii or ZPB) of which Pomorski was the Secretary for 5 years and chairman for the next 27 years.

Through the years, Pomorski continued organizing Polish schools, even in West Germany, and monitoring new teachers, many of them recruited among the deportees from the Nazi camps. For a few years, the London Government in Exile was paying up to 3o of them, teaching as many as 3000 children in 1948 in Belgium. In 1949, Pomorski founded the Lycėe Polonais of Brussels, a correspondence school to allow displaced youth to complete their secondary studies. As funds disappeared, Pomorski continued to operate the school system under the Patronage of the Union of Poles (ZPB) and the Free Poles of Belgium (Macierz). They authored their own textbooks and supported the teachers through donations, as well as social, cultural and sporting events.

Pomorski remained dedicated to the concept of Scouting until his later years. He organized summer camps and trained counsellors. With the help of other dedicated Poles, ZPB acquired a property "The Millenium" in the Ardennes at Comblain-la-Tour where many activities are still taking place, including the summer camps. Until he died in 1995, he organized yearly ceremonies at Polish military cemeteries and delivered many speeches on armistice days. The reefs were financed through the proceeds coming from social and cultural events. He published a bulletin Polak w Belgii (Poles in Belgium) for many years and after his wife died, he took over Brukselskie Nowiny (Brussels' News). He pursued literary interests, particularly those that relate to the intelligentsia in exile. He gave lectures at the Polish Congress of Contemporary Science and Culture, in London (1970), in Liège (1956), in Heidelberg (1957), and at the International Literary Symposium in Strasbourg (1966), on subjects very sensitive to writers in exile.

In 1993, he created the Polish Center for Cultural and Scientific Studies in Brussels. This center, now much reduced, pursues some activities in the framework of the Polish Library in Brussels.

From 1957 to 1985, Pomorski was the Delegate of the Government in Exile for all matters regarding Polish emigration. In December 1970, the Prime Minister in exile Zygmunt Muchniewski made Pomorski Minister Plenipotentiary of Poland for Belgium a position he held until the end of 1988. He succeeded Jerzy Korab-Brzozowski (1957–1970).

In 1975, Pomorski was delegated to Washington to attend the Polish Cultural Congress (held once every 10 years), as representative of the Polish emigration worldwide. He was elected Member of the National Council of the Republic by the Polish emigration of Belgium on April 30, 1989.

When President Walesa was in Brussels for an official visit, he invited Pomorski to come to Warsaw to present a conference on the activities of the Polish emigration before, during and after the war. The audience was surprised by the scope of work accomplished by Pomorski and his wife, all on a gratuitous level. In 1991, President Walesa made him a ==Permanent Member of the Parliament== and invited him to attend all parliamentary sessions. He was named Commander of the Order of Polonia Restituta in 1991. He died in Brussels on January 2, 1995, and is buried at the Cemetery of Comblain-La-Tour in a joint grave with wife Jadwiga who died in Brussels on May 15, 1979. He had 3 children, Anna, Andrzej and Alina, born in Poland, France and Belgium.

== Honours ==
From France -

  - The Combatant's Cross for action in the Resistance 1940–1945.

From Belgium;-

- The Cross of the Valorous for the Resistance 1940–1945.
- Pomorski was recognized Armed fighter in 1952 by the Minister of Defense.
- Was honoured with the Commemorative Medal 1940–1945 with crossed sabers by the Kingdom of Belgium in 1956.

From Poland

- Polonia Restituta, Knight (1970) and Officer levels (1988) awarded by the Polish Government-in -exile in London.
- Polonia Restituta, the Commander's Cross (1991) awarded by L.Walesa, President of the Republic.
- -Cross of the Valorous given in 1945 by the Polish Armed Forces in London for action in the resistance movement P.O.W.N.
- -Cross of the Valorous for the Defense of the Homeland 1918–1921, attributed in 1992 by President Lech Walesa.
- -Bronze Medal with crossed sabers for 10 years of service to the nation, 1938.
- -Silver Cross of Merit with crossed sabers for services rendered in Poland with the Diplomatic Services in France, 1936.

From Yugoslavia

- Commemorative medal of the Royal Yugoslav Army given by King Peter II in exile for the 20th anniversary of the end of hostilities 1941–1945.
