= Anna of Pomerania, Duchess of Lubin =

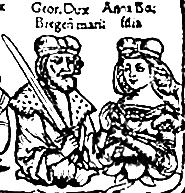
George I of Brieg and Anna of Pomerania

Anna of Pomerania (Polish: Anna Pomorska; 1492 – 25 April 1550) was a German princess. She was a member of the House of Pomerania (also known as House of Greifen or House of Griffins) and by marriage Duchess of Brzeg.

She was the eldest daughter of Bogislaw X, Duke of Pomerania, by his second wife Anna, daughter of King Casimir IV of Poland.

== Life ==
On June 9, 1516, Anna married Duke George I of Brieg. The union, which lasted until George I's death in 1521, was childless. Anna was en early supporter of the Protestant Reformation. Her brother, the rector of Wittenberg, was present at the Leipzig Debate.

According to her husband's will, Anna received the Duchy of Lubin as her dower with full sovereignty over that land until her own death twenty-nine years later, when Lubin reverted to the Duchy of Legnica.

Anna of Pomerania, Duchess of Lubin House of Griffins Born: 1492 Died: 25 April 1550
Preceded by George I	Duchess of Lubin; 1521–1550	Succeeded by Frederick III
