= Casimir of Pomerania =

Casimir of Pomerania may refer to:

- Casimir I, Duke of Pomerania-Demmin
- Casimir II, Duke of Pomerania-Demmin
- Casimir III, Duke of Pomerania-Stettin
- Casimir IV, Duke of Pomerania-Stolp
