= Frederick II of Legnica =

Duke of Legnica (1480–1547)

Frederick II
- Duke of Legnica, Brzeg
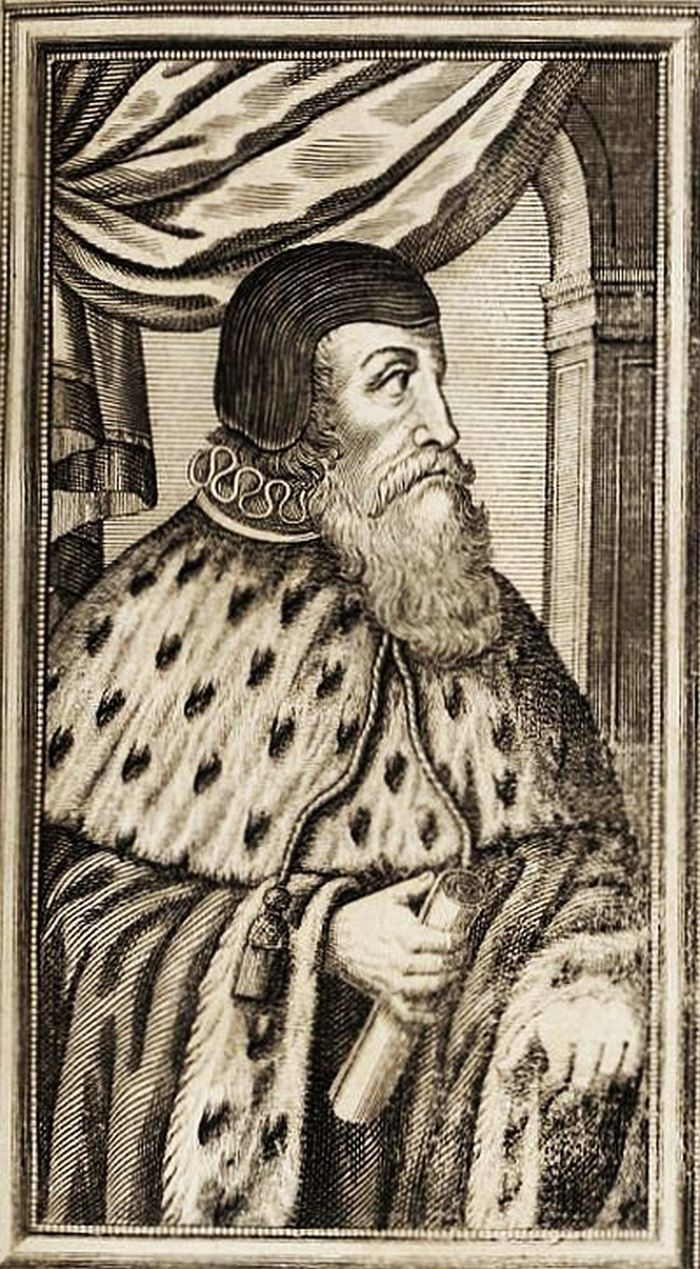
- Frederick II of Legnica, engraving by Bartholomäus Strachowsky, 1733
- Born: 12 February 1480; Legnica
- Died: 17 September 1547 (aged 67); Legnica
- Noble family: Silesian Piasts
- Spouses: Elizabeth Jagiellon; Sophie of Brandenburg-Ansbach-Kulmbach
- Issue: Frederick III; George II the Pious; Sophie
- Father: Frederick I of Legnica
- Mother: Ludmila of Poděbrady

Frederick II, Duke of Legnica (Polish: Fryderyk II Legnicki) (12 February 1480 – 17 September 1547), also known as the Great of Legnica (Polish: Legnicki Wielki), was a Duke of Legnica from 1488 (until 1495 and 1505 with his brothers), of Brzeg from 1521. The most notorious of all Legnica Piast rulers, thanks to his excellent financial politics his Duchy was expanded to the Oder River, and he became the founder of the Duchy of Legnica-Wołów-Brzeg (German: Herzogtum Liegnitz-Wohlau-Brieg).

== Life ==
He was the second son of Frederick I, Duke of Chojnów-Oława-Legnica-Brzeg-Lubin, by his wife Ludmila, daughter of George of Poděbrady, King of Bohemia.

A minor at the death of his father in 1488, Frederick II and his brothers John II and George I inherited Legnica, Chojnów and Lubin under the regency of their mother, Dowager Duchess Ludmila, regnant Duchess of Brzeg and Oława as a dower. During his early years, the young Dukes spent some time in Prague, at the court of King Vladislaus II of Bohemia.

The premature death of his older brother John II in 1495 left Frederick II as the Head of his house, but he remained under his mother's tutelage for another three years, until 1498, when he could take over by himself the government of Legnica. When George I also reached adulthood in 1505, both brothers decided to divide their domains. Frederick II kept Legnica and all the minor Duchies, and George I obtained Brzeg (which after the death of Ludmila in 1503 reverted to them with Oława) and Lubin.

In 1507, Frederick II made a pilgrimage to the Holy Land where he is said to have been dubbed a Knight of the Holy Sepulchre.

During 1516-1526 he was Governor of Lower Silesia.

After George I's death in 1521 without issue, Frederick inherited Brzeg (Lubin was given to his sister-in-law as dower); this and the purchase of Wołów in 1523 increased his finances and brought about in all his domains a time of prosperity. In the same year he mediated between the Teutonic Grand Master Albert of Brandenburg and King Sigismund I of Poland, for the possession of Prussia, which eventually became the secular Duchy of Prussia in 1525, with Albert as its Duke but under Polish sovereignty.

From 1523 Frederick II was a strong supporter of the Reformation and founded in 1526 the first Protestant University in Legnica; however, because of the controversies between Luther and Caspar Schwenckfeld, it wasn't until 1530 that the University finally opened. Despite his own conversion to Protestantism, Frederick II allowed his subjects to choose their own religion.

During his reign, Frederick II worked for the order and cleanliness of his cities, established public lighting and paved streets.

His achievements also enhanced the defense of their Duchy. In his desire to change Legnica's layout he replaced numerous chapels and churches with city walls and fortress. Before the year 1521 there were in the suburbs about 15 churches and chapels, all these were demolished. Together with his wife Sophie, Frederick II also founded a bronze Army to defend the city.

From 1540 to 1544 he obtained the Duchy of Głogów as a pledge. In 1542 his nephews Joachim, Henry II, John and George of Poděbrady pledged to him their Duchy of Ziębice (Münsterberg), which after Frederick II's death was taken by Ferdinand I of Habsburg.

He is one of the figures on the Prussian Homage painting by Jan Matejko.

== Marriages and Issue ==
On 21 November 1515, Frederick II married firstly Elisabeth (b. 13 November 1482 – 16 February 1517), daughter of King Casimir IV of Poland. They had one daughter:

1. Hedwig (b. and d. 2 February 1517).

On 14 November 1519, Frederick II married secondly Sophie of Brandenburg-Ansbach-Kulmbach (b. Ansbach, 10 March 1485 – d. Legnica, 14 May 1537), daughter of Frederick I, Margrave of Brandenburg-Ansbach, and niece of his first wife. They had three children:

1. Frederick III (b. 22 February 1520 – d. Legnica, 15 December 1570).
2. George II the Pious (b. Legnica, 18 July 1523 – d. Schloss Brieg, 7 May 1586).
3. Sophie (b. 1525 – d. Berlin, 6 February 1546), married on 15 February 1545 to John George, later (1571) Elector of Brandenburg.

Frederick II of Legnica House of Poděbrady Born: 12 February 1480 Died: 17 September 1547
Regnal titles
Preceded by Frederick I	Duke of Legnica with John II (until 1495) and George I (until 1505); 1488–1547	Succeeded by Frederick III
Preceded by Ludmila	Duke of Brzeg with George I 1503–1505	Succeeded by George I
Preceded by George I	Duke of Brzeg; 1521–1547	Succeeded by George II the Pious
Preceded by Casimir II	Duke of Ścinawa (Wołów); 1528–1547	Succeeded by George II the Pious
Preceded by Direct sovereignty of the Kingdom of Bohemia last holder Casimir II	Duke of Głogów; 1540–1544	Succeeded by Annexed by the Kingdom of Bohemia
Preceded by George II, and his brothers Henry II, Joachim, and John of Münsterberg-Oels	Duke of Münsterberg (Ziębice); 1542–1547	Succeeded by Ferdinand I
