= Chojnów =

Town in Lower Silesian Voivodeship, Poland

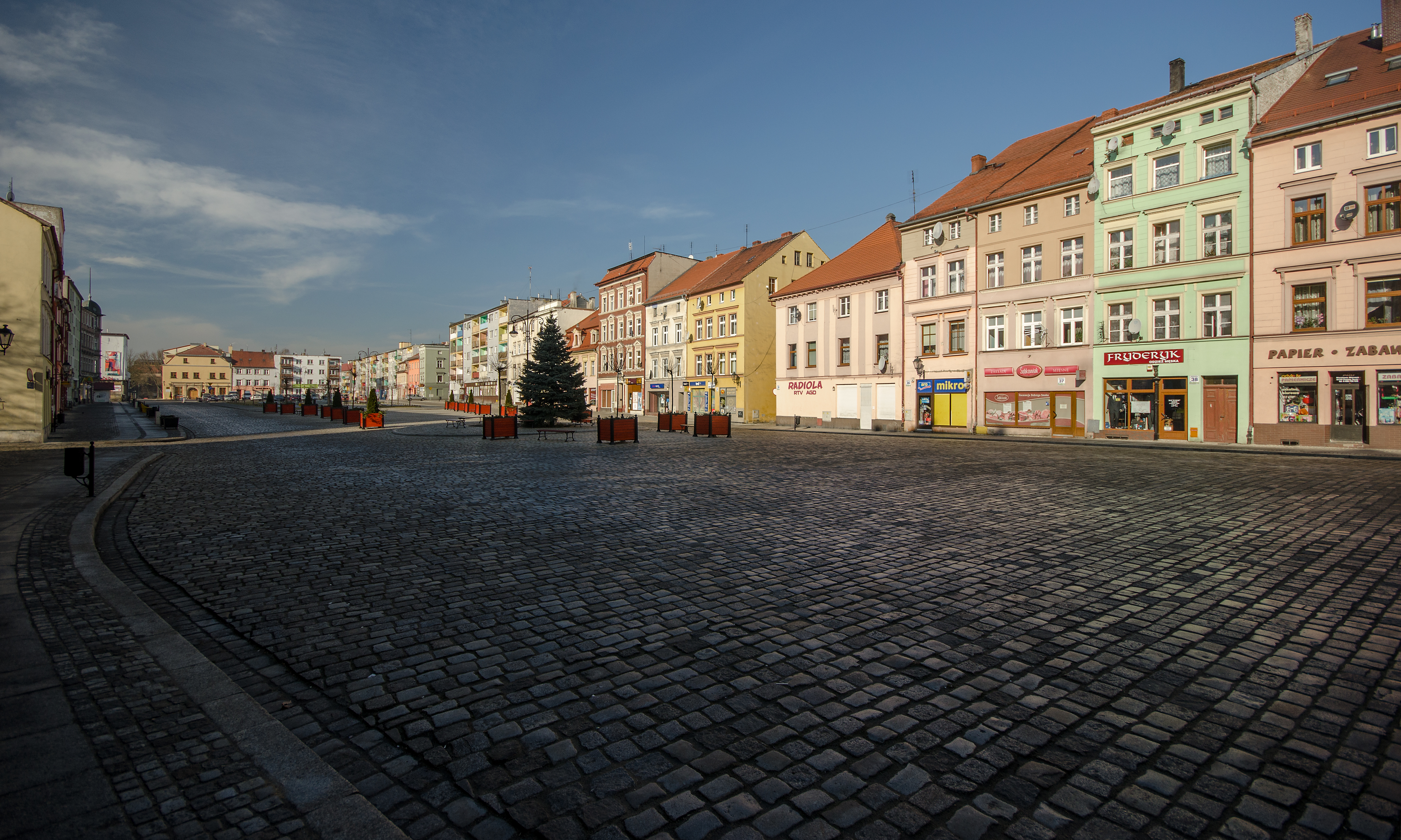
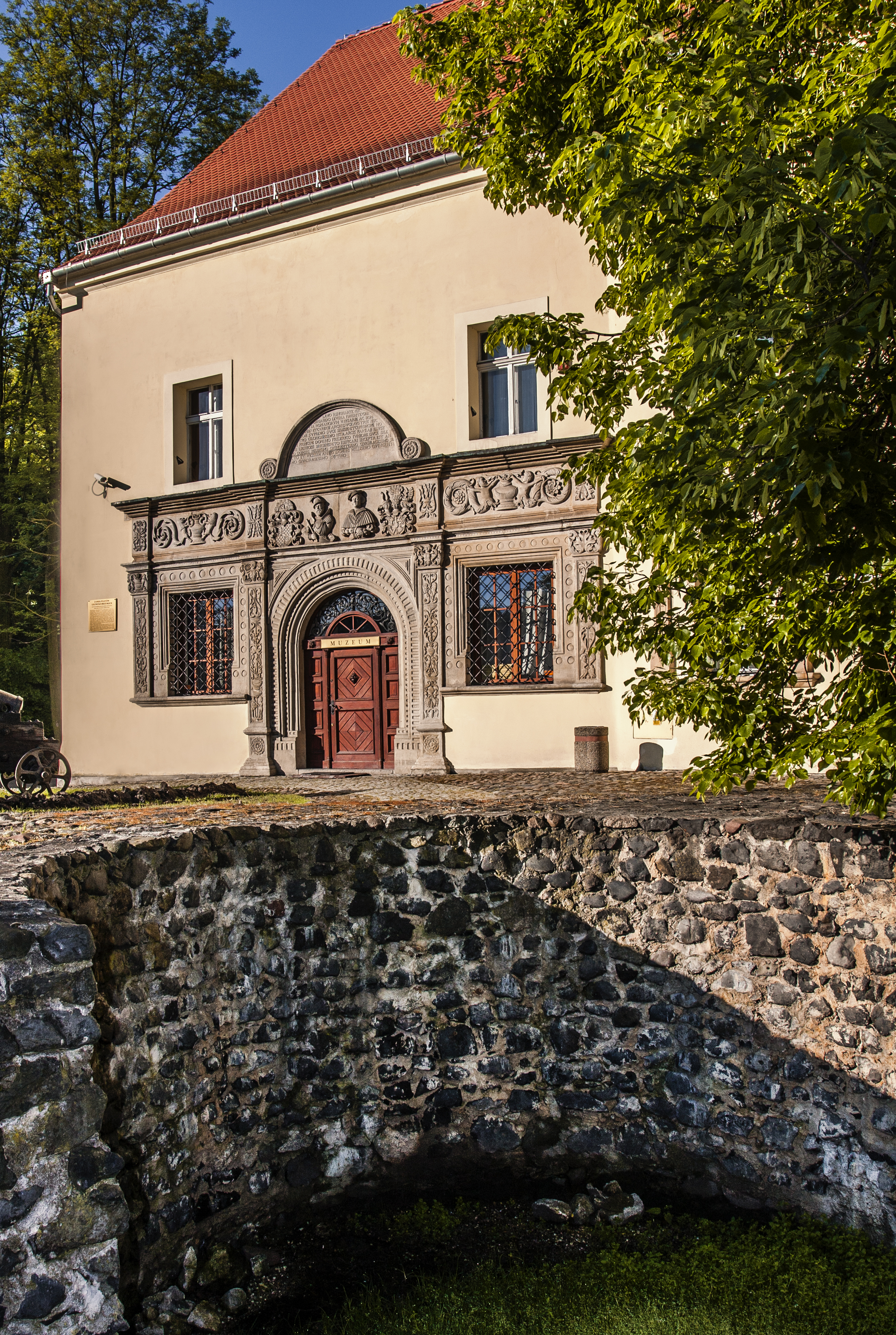
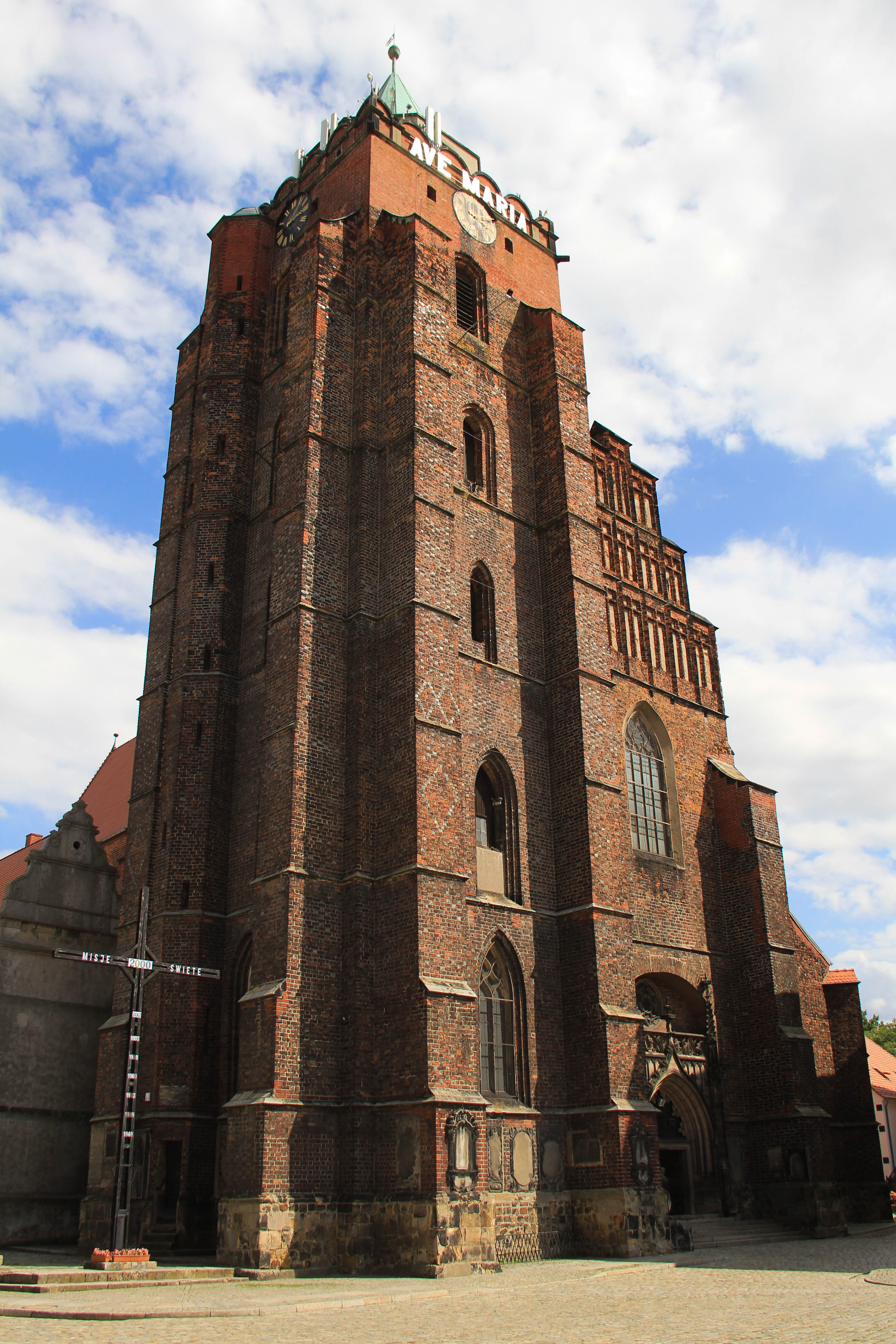
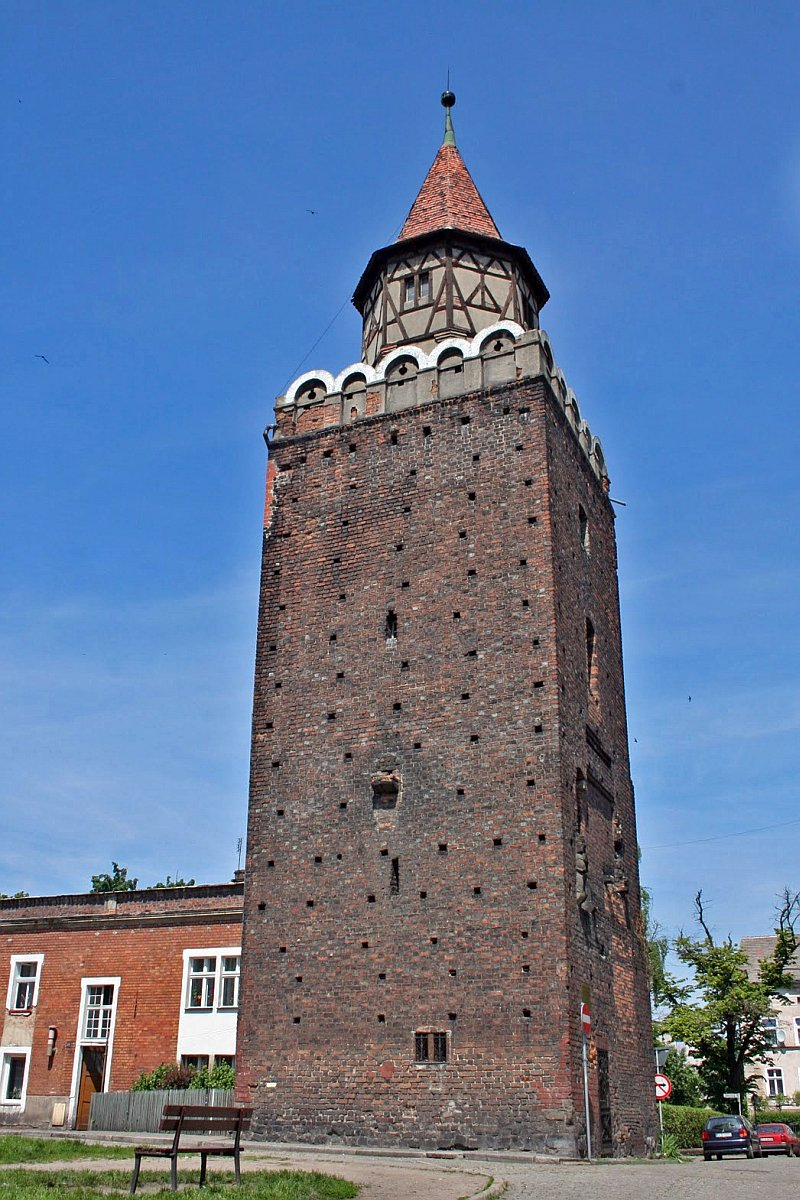
- Market Square Piast Castle Saints Peter and Paul Church Weavers Tower

- Flag Coat of arms

- Location within Poland
- Coordinates: 51°16′N 15°56′E
- Country: Poland
- Voivodeship: Lower Silesian
- County: Legnica
- Gmina: Chojnów (urban gmina)
- Established: 14th century
- Town rights: 1333

Government
  - Mayor: Jan Serkies

Area
  - Total: 5.32 km^{2} (2.05 sq mi)
- Elevation: 170 m (560 ft)

Population (31 December 2021)
  - Total: 13,002
  - Density: 2,440/km^{2} (6,330/sq mi)
- Time zone: UTC+1 (CET)
  - Summer (DST): UTC+2 (CEST)
- Postal code: 59-224, 59-225
- Area code: +48 76
- Car plates: DLE
- Website: chojnow.eu

Chojnów [ˈxɔjnuf] (German: Haynau) is a small town in Legnica County, Lower Silesian Voivodeship, in south-western Poland. It is located on the Skora river, a tributary of the Kaczawa at an average altitude of 170 m (560 ft) above sea level. Chojnów is the administrative seat of the rural gmina called Gmina Chojnów, although the town is not part of its territory and forms a separate urban gmina. As of December 2021, the town has 13,002 inhabitants.

The town originated in medieval Silesia under the Silesian Piasts. From the 13th century, German settlement and urban institutions shaped its development. In the 14th century, the town became part of the Bohemian Crown within the Holy Roman Empire, later passing under Habsburg rule. Known in German as Haynau, it became part of Prussia in 1742 and the German Empire in 1871. Following World War II, the town was placed under Polish administration in 1945. Most of its German inhabitants fled or were expelled, and the town was resettled by Poles and renamed Chojnów.

Chojnów is located 18 km (11 mi) west of Legnica, 26 km (16 mi) east from Bolesławiec and 18 km (11 mi) north of Złotoryja, 5 km (3.1 mi) from the A4 motorway. It has railroad connections to Bolesławiec and Legnica.

== Heraldry ==
The Chojnów coat of arms is a blue escutcheon featuring a white castle with three towers. To the right side of the central tower is a silver crescent moon and to its left side a golden sun. In the gate of the castle is a Silesian Eagle on a yellow background. Chojnów's motto is "Friendly Town".

== Geography ==
Chojnów is located in the Central-Western part of the Lower Silesia region. The Skora (Leather) River flows through the town in a westerly direction. The city of Chojnów is 5.32 km^{2} (2.05 sq mi) in area, including 41% agricultural land.

Chojnów has a connection with the major cities of the country (road and rail) and located 5 kilometres (3 miles) south of Chojnów has the A4 Autostrada. To the South of the town is the surrounding Chojnowska Plain.

== History ==
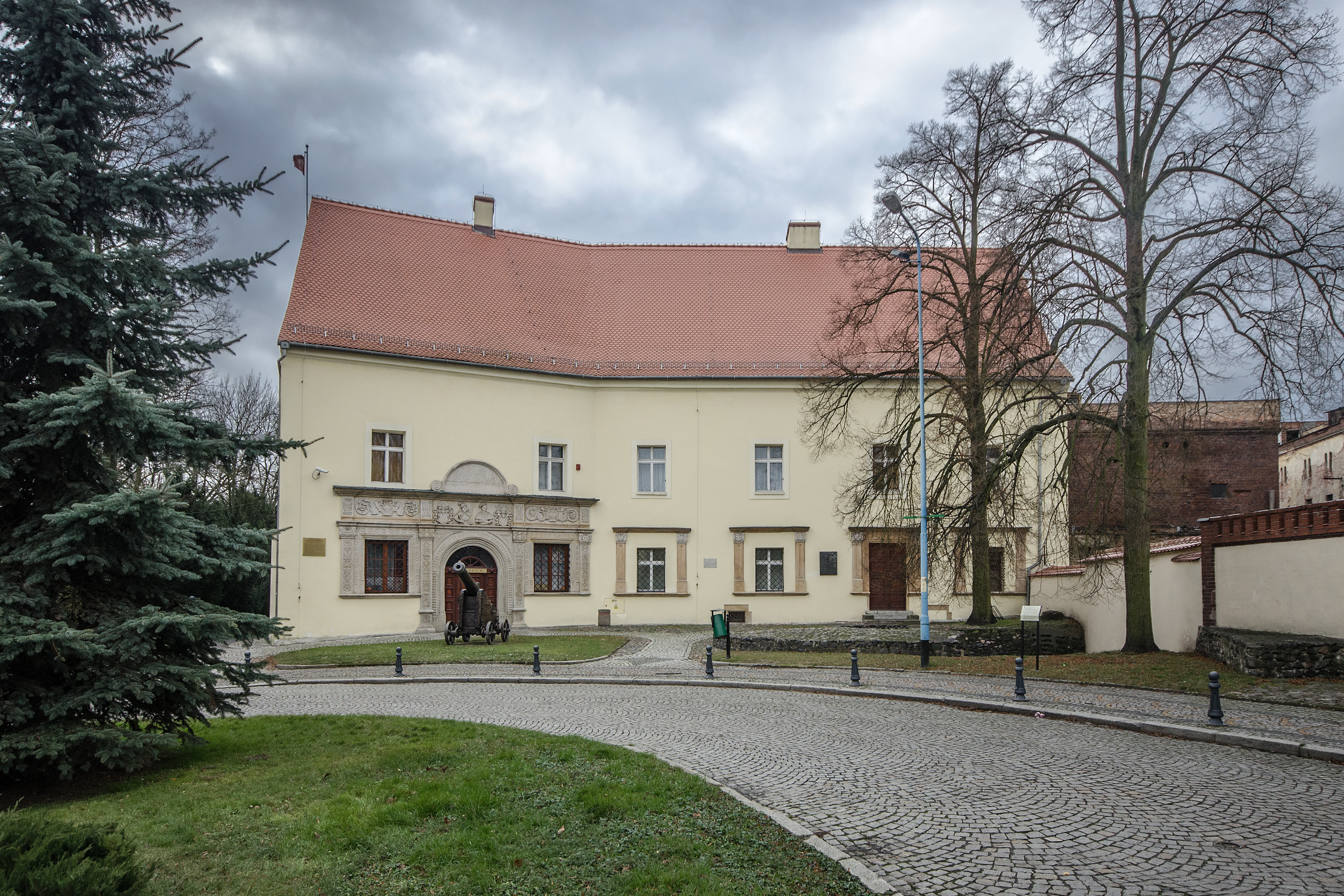
Piast Castle in Chojnów

A document issued in Breslau (Wrocław) on 26 February 1253 mentions a place called Honowo, which may have been Haynau, although the identification remains uncertain. The settlement is documented as Haynow in 1272 and as Haynaw civitas in 1288. The first recorded castellan, Bronisław Budziwojowic, appears in a document from 1292. In 1333, Duke Bolesław III the Generous granted the town full municipal privileges. The town was known in German as Haynau until 1945. The Polish form Hajnów appears in 19th-century geographical publications.

Haynau belonged to several duchies ruled by branches of the Silesian Piasts, including those centred on Breslau, Glogau and Liegnitz. In 1329, Duke Bolesław III acknowledged the suzerainty of King John of Bohemia over the Duchy of Liegnitz. Haynau came under the Bohemian Crown in 1331, although the Silesian Piasts continued to govern the town. During the 14th century, Haynau developed as a trading and craft centre. Its location on a branch of the Via Regia connected it with other Silesian towns and the trade routes leading westwards into Saxony. The town's defensive walls are first mentioned in 1357, when the castle was already incorporated into the fortifications. In 1428, during the Hussite Wars, the Hussites captured and burned the town and its castle. The inhabitants subsequently received an eight-year exemption from certain taxes and obligations to assist with rebuilding.

Clothmaking was among Haynau's principal trades in the late medieval and early modern periods. The Reformation was introduced under Duke Frederick II in 1523, and Lutheranism subsequently became the predominant confession. Between 1546 and 1547, Duke Frederick III had the medieval castle rebuilt as a Renaissance residence. An inscription above its entrance commemorated the rebuilding. The town suffered several major fires in the late 16th century, followed by an epidemic in 1613. During the Thirty Years' War, imperial and Swedish troops were quartered in Haynau, and the town suffered from plundering, military contributions and disease. Following the death of George William, the last Piast duke of Liegnitz, in 1675, the duchy reverted to the Bohemian Crown and came under direct Habsburg administration.

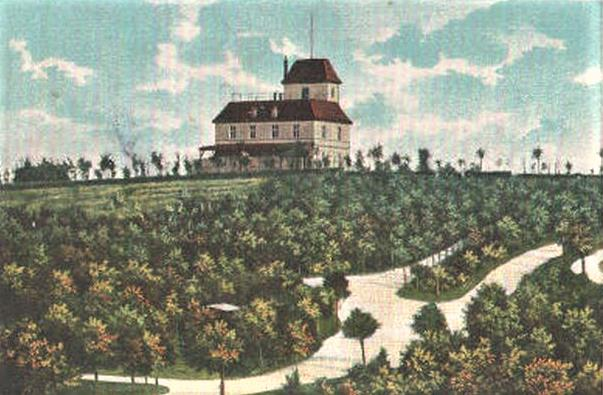
Early 20th-century view of the Piast Park

Haynau was occupied by Prussian troops during the First Silesian War and became part of the Kingdom of Prussia in 1742. Cloth manufacturing remained an important trade, and a vocational school for clothmakers was established in 1762. A major fire in the same year damaged parts of the town, including the castle. During the Napoleonic Wars, Haynau was affected by troop movements and military requisitions. On 26 May 1813, Prussian cavalry under Gebhard Leberecht von Blücher defeated French forces commanded by Nicolas Joseph Maison in the Battle of Haynau. Napoleon stayed in the town in July of that year.

The opening of the railway between Liegnitz and Bunzlau in 1845 improved Haynau's transport connections. Industrial development during the 19th century included leather processing, papermaking, machinery production and textile manufacturing. Municipal sewerage was introduced in 1848, gas infrastructure in 1867 and electricity in 1912. Haynau became part of the German Empire in 1871. The town's population grew during industrialisation, and the paper industry became one of its important employers.

During the Weimar Republic, the Social Democratic Party of Germany was an important force in local politics. The Nazi Party subsequently gained influence and established control over the municipal administration in 1933. The Social Democratic mayor, Hermann Kranold, was arrested following the Nazi takeover. Haynau's Jewish community was subjected to persecution under Nazi rule. Its synagogue, built in 1893, was converted into a gymnasium following Kristallnacht in November 1938, and the congregation had ceased to exist by the early 1940s. During World War II, Polish forced labourers were brought to Haynau, with the first arrivals recorded in 1939.

As the Red Army advanced into Silesia in early 1945, part of Haynau's population fled or was evacuated. Soviet troops captured the town on 10 February 1945, by which time it had suffered considerable wartime damage.

=== Post-war period ===
Following Germany's defeat in World War II, Haynau was placed under Polish administration. Most of the remaining German inhabitants were expelled, while Polish settlers from various regions arrived, including people displaced from the eastern territories of prewar Poland annexed by the Soviet Union. The establishment of Polish municipal administration began on 10 June 1945. The first organised group of Polish settlers arrived two days later, and Soviet military authorities formally transferred the town's civil administration to Polish officials on 15 June. Initially called Gajewicko under Polish administration, the town received its present name, Chojnów, in 1946.

Reconstruction began shortly after the war. Factories were repaired or replaced, and Chojnów developed new residential neighbourhoods, schools and industrial facilities. Among the principal employers during the Polish People's Republic were machinery manufacturers and clothing factories. In January 1950, approximately 20 families of refugees from the Greek Civil War settled in Chojnów. The former Piast Castle was restored and reopened as a municipal museum in 1959. Chojnów's population increased during the postwar decades, exceeding 10,000 in the 1960s and 14,000 in the 1990s.

Following the end of communist rule in 1989, Chojnów experienced the restructuring and privatisation of state-owned industries. The first democratic local government elections were held on 27 May 1990. The decision to restore separate administrations for the town and the surrounding rural municipality was taken on 27 December 1990 and came into effect on 2 April 1991.

== Population ==
Historical population

Year	Pop.	±%
1843	3,899	—
1871	4,967	+27.4%
1880	5,724	+15.2%
1890	8,115	+41.8%
1900	10,142	+25.0%
1910	10,461	+3.1%

Year	Pop.	±%
1925	10,227	−2.2%
1939	11,114	+8.7%
1950	4,531	−59.2%
1960	9,583	+111.5%
2005	14,510	+51.4%
2010	14,328	−1.3%

== Economy ==
Chojnów is an industrial and agricultural town. Among local products are: paper, agricultural machinery, chains, metal furniture for hospitals, equipment for the meat industry, beer, wine, leather clothing, and clothing for infants, children and adults.

== Sights and nature ==
Among the interesting monuments of Chojnów are the 13th-century castle of the Dukes of Legnica (currently used as a museum), two old churches, the Baszta Tkaczy (Weavers' Tower) and preserved fragments of city walls.

The biggest green area in Chojnów is small forest Park Piastowski (Piast's Park), named after Piast dynasty. Wild animals that can be found in the Chojnów area are roe deer, foxes, rabbits and wild domestic animals, especially cats.

== Transport ==
National road 94 bypasses Chojnów to the south.

The A4 motorway runs to the south of Chojnów.

Voivodeship road number 328 passes through the town.

Chojnów has a station on the Legnica-Zgorzelec railway line.

== Culture and sport ==
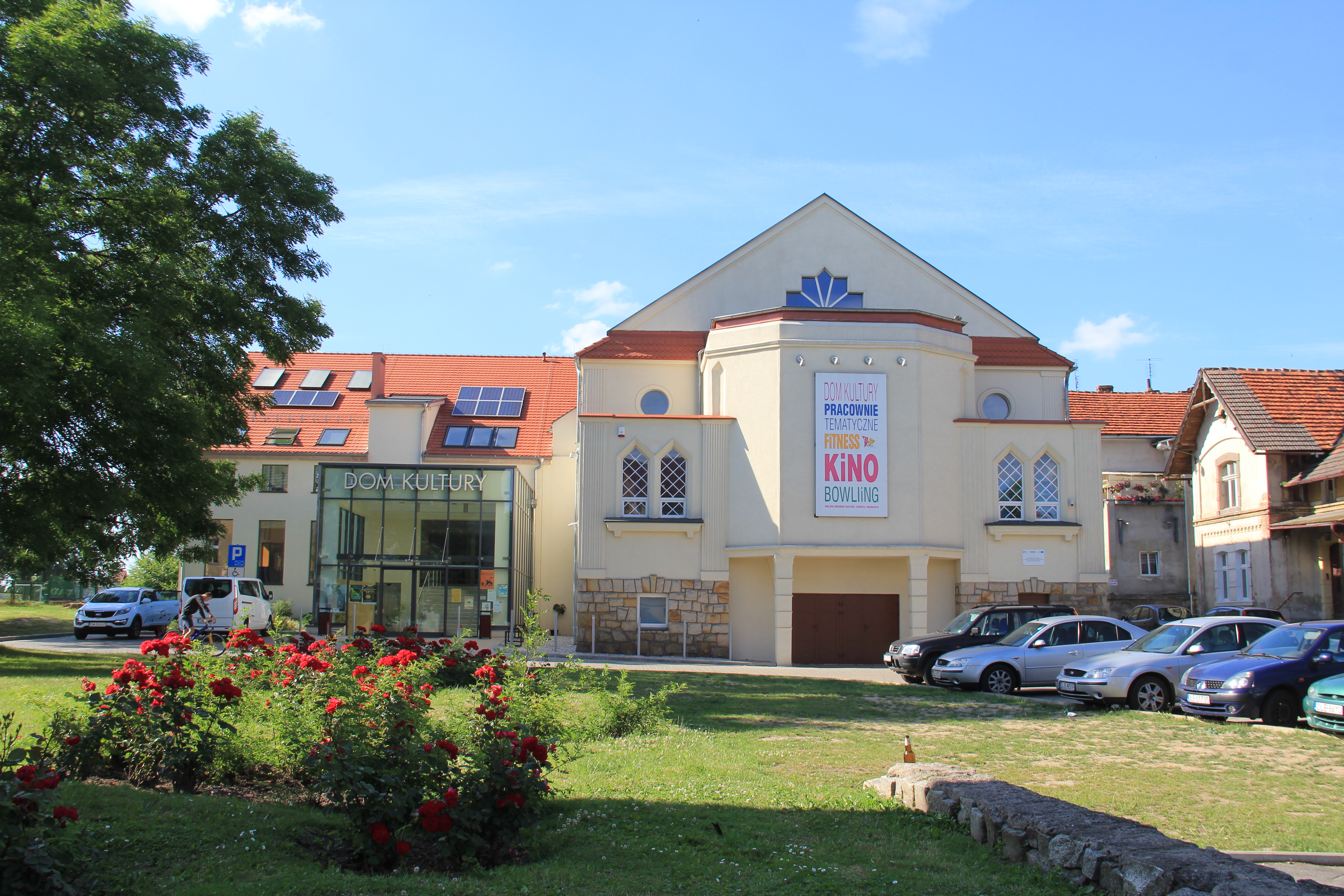
Miejski Dom Kultury ("Municipal House of Culture")

Every year in the first days of June, the Days of Chojnów (Dni Chojnowa) are celebrated. The Whole-Poland bike race Masters has been organized yearly in Chojnów for the past few years.

Chojnów has a Municipal sports and recreation center formed in 2008 holding various events, festivals, reviews, exhibitions, and competitions. The regional Museum is housed in the old Piast era castle. The collections include tiles, relics, and the castle garden. Next to the Museum there is a municipal library. In śródmiejskim Park, near the Town Hall is the amphitheatre.

The local government-run weekly newspaper is Gazeta Chojnowska, which has been published since 1992. It is published biweekly. Editions have a run of 900 copies and it is one of the oldest newspapers in Poland issued without interruption. The Chojnów is the official newspaper of Chojnów with copy run of 750 copies.

== Education ==
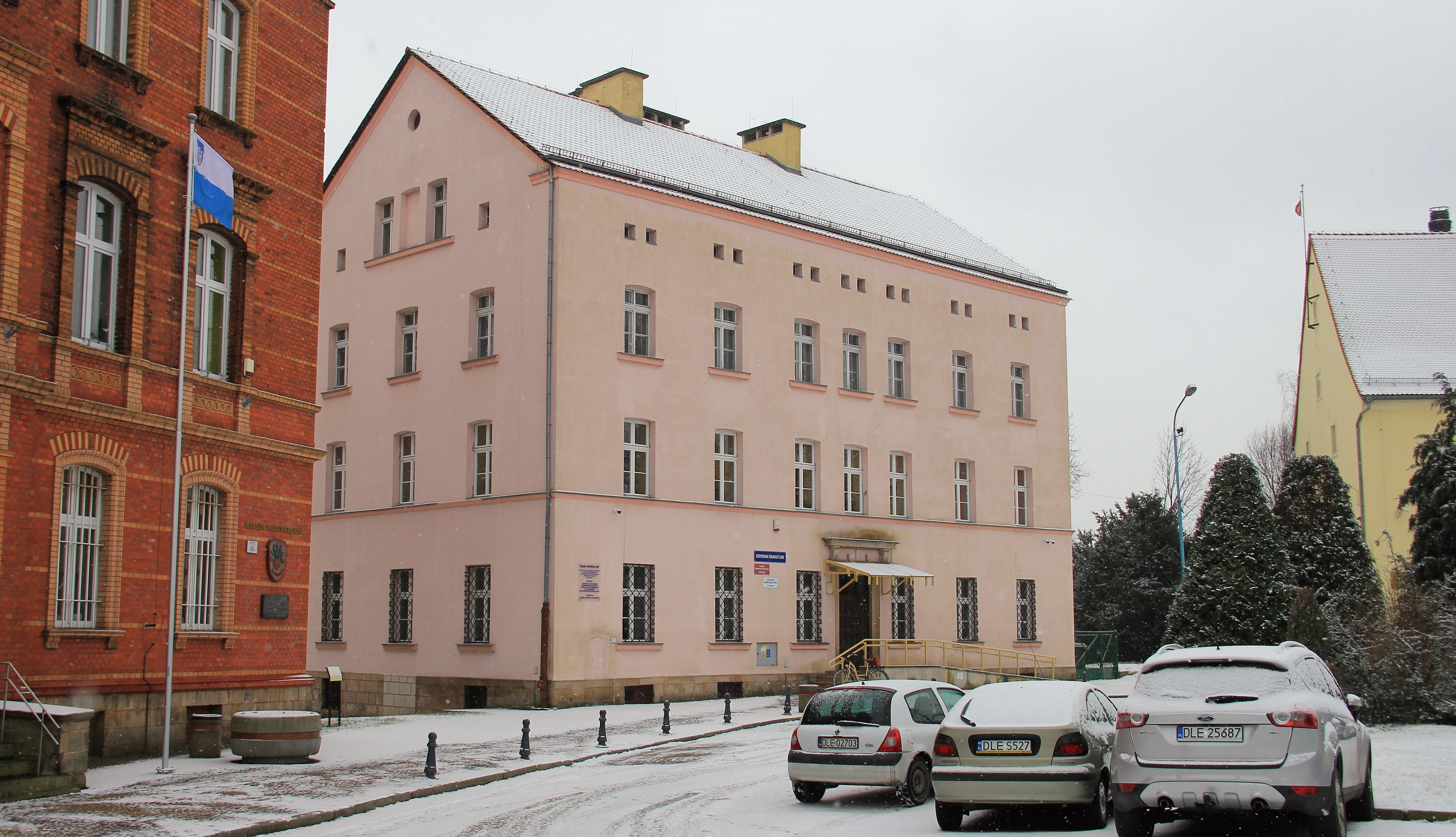
Education Centre in Chojnów

In Chojnów, there are two kindergartens, two elementary schools and two middle schools.

- Mary Konopnickiej is the smallest elementary school in Chojnów, and is located in the northern part of the city, close to the train station and founded in 1962.
- Janusz Korczak is the largest primary school in Chojnów in the southern part of the town.
- Middle School No. (Pope John Paul II), it is situated in the north-western part of the city next to the "Small Church".
- Gimnazjum nr 2 im. Nicolaus Copernicus is the largest high school in Chojnów.
- Liceum Ogólnokształcące im. Nicolaus Copernicus

== Religion ==
Chojnów is in the Catholic deanery of Chojnów and has two parishes, Immaculate Conception of the Blessed Virgin Mary and also the Holy Apostles Peter and Paul. Both parishes have active congregations. There are also two Congregations of Jehovah's witnesses.

== Notable people ==
- Johann Wilhelm Ritter (1776–1810), chemist and physicist
- Georg Michaelis (1857–1936), politician, Chancellor of Germany (1917).
- Edith Jacobson (1897–1978), German psychoanalyst
- Oswald Lange (1912–2000), German–American aerospace engineer
- Horst Mahler (born 1936), German lawyer, former Red Army Faction militant, now Neo-Nazi activist

== Twin towns – sister cities ==
Chojnów is twinned with:

- Commentry, France
- Egelsbach, Germany
- Mnichovo Hradiště, Czech Republic

== Gallery ==
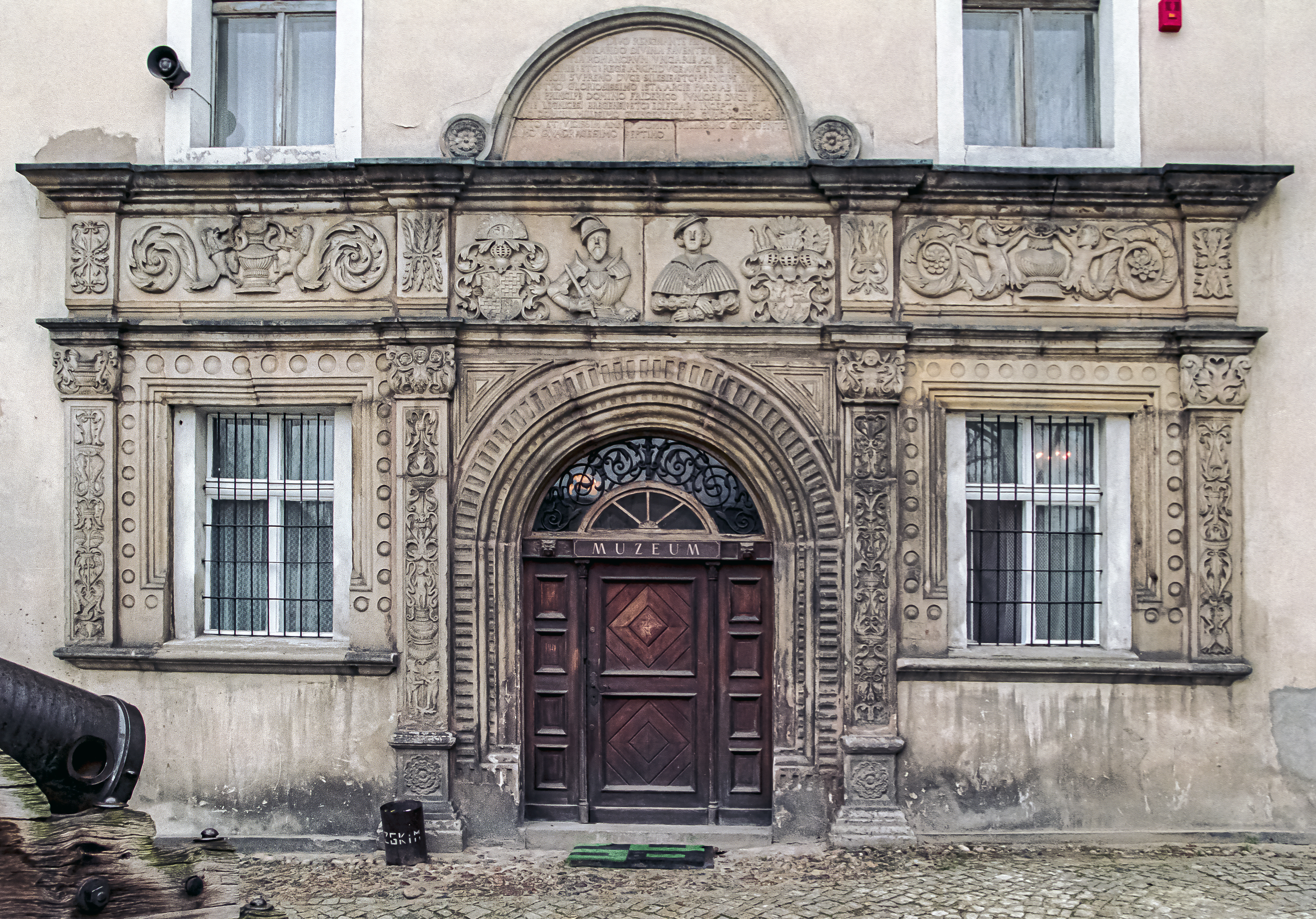
Entrance to the Piast Castle

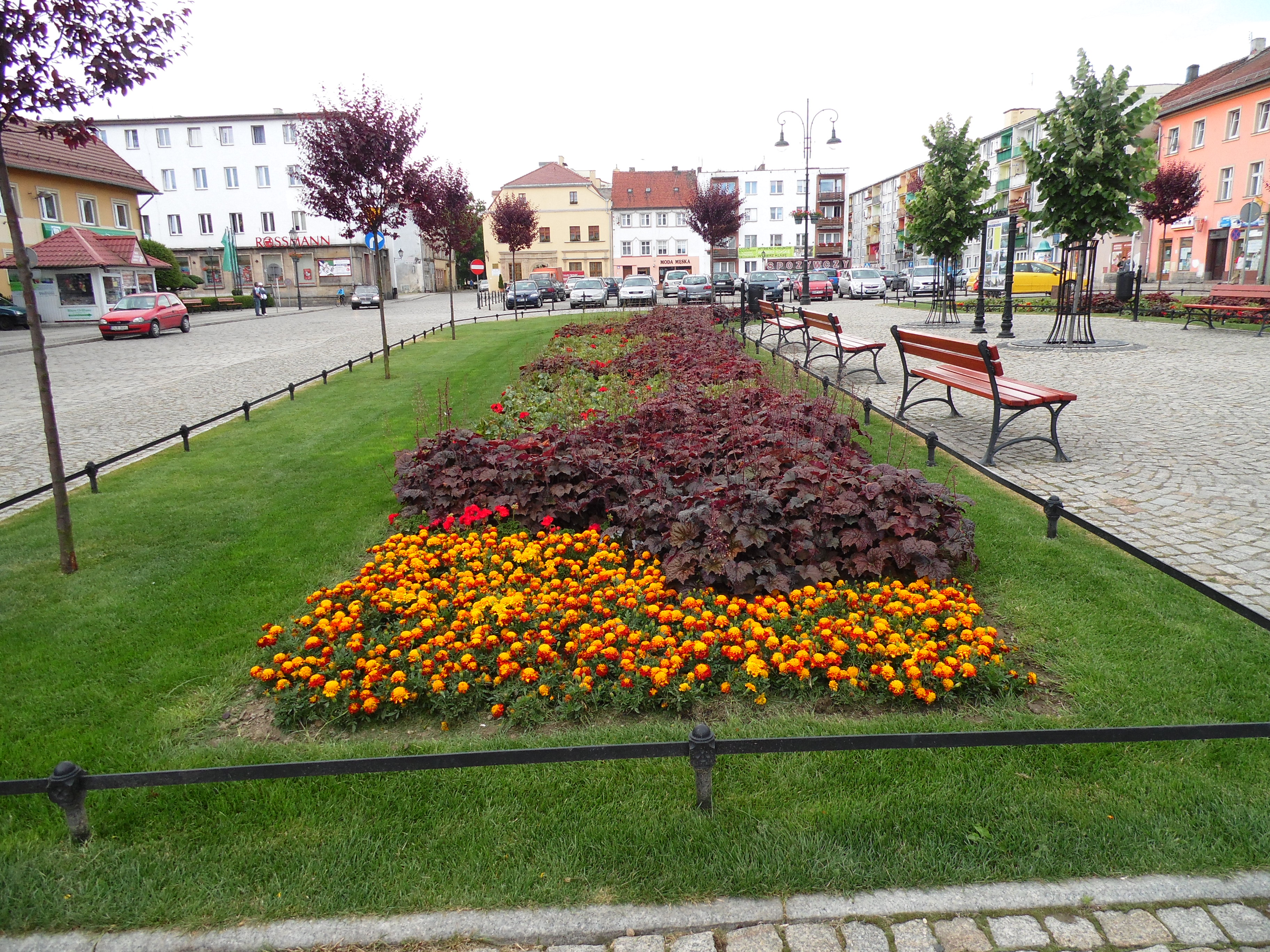
Flower beds in Chojnów

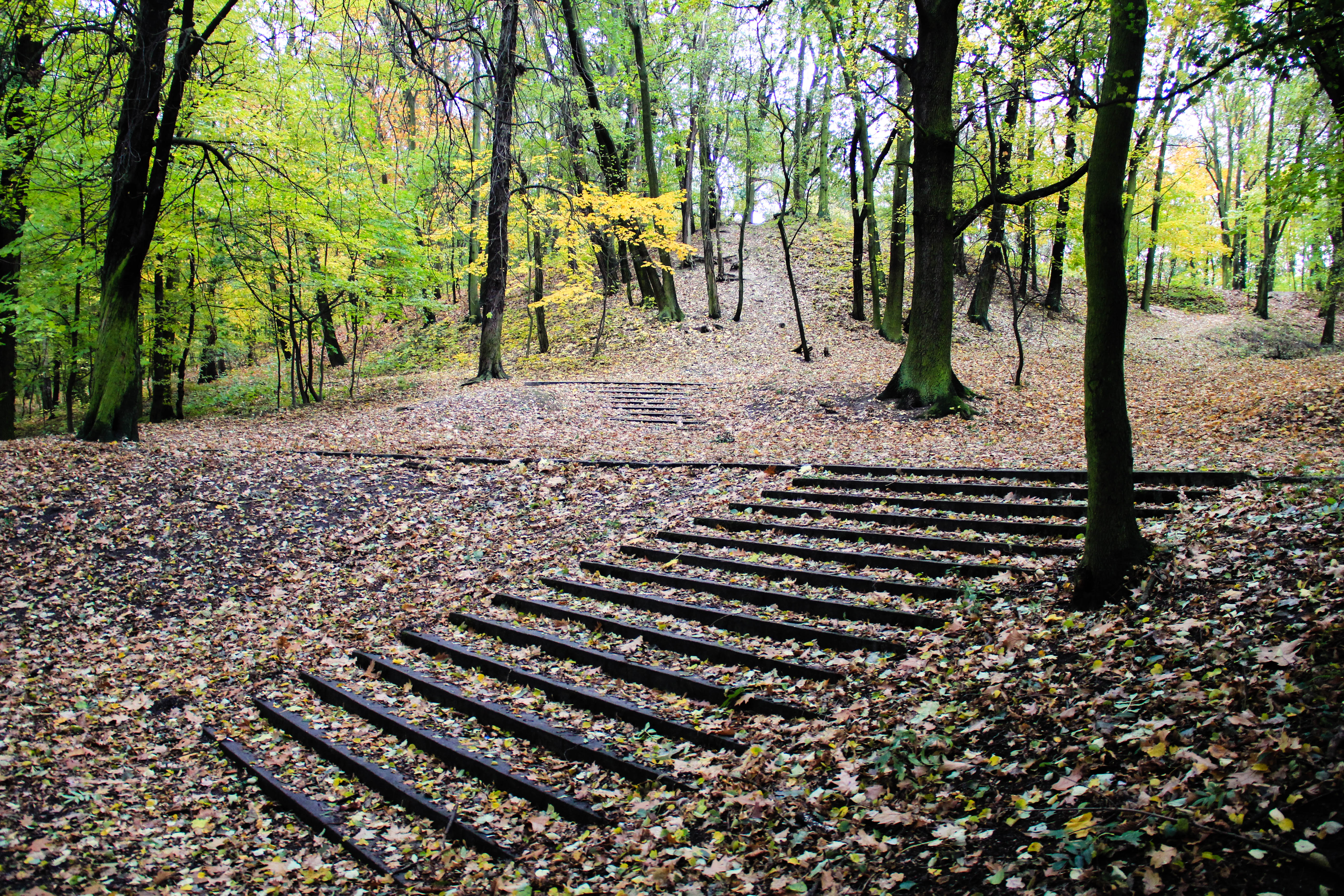
Park Piastowski

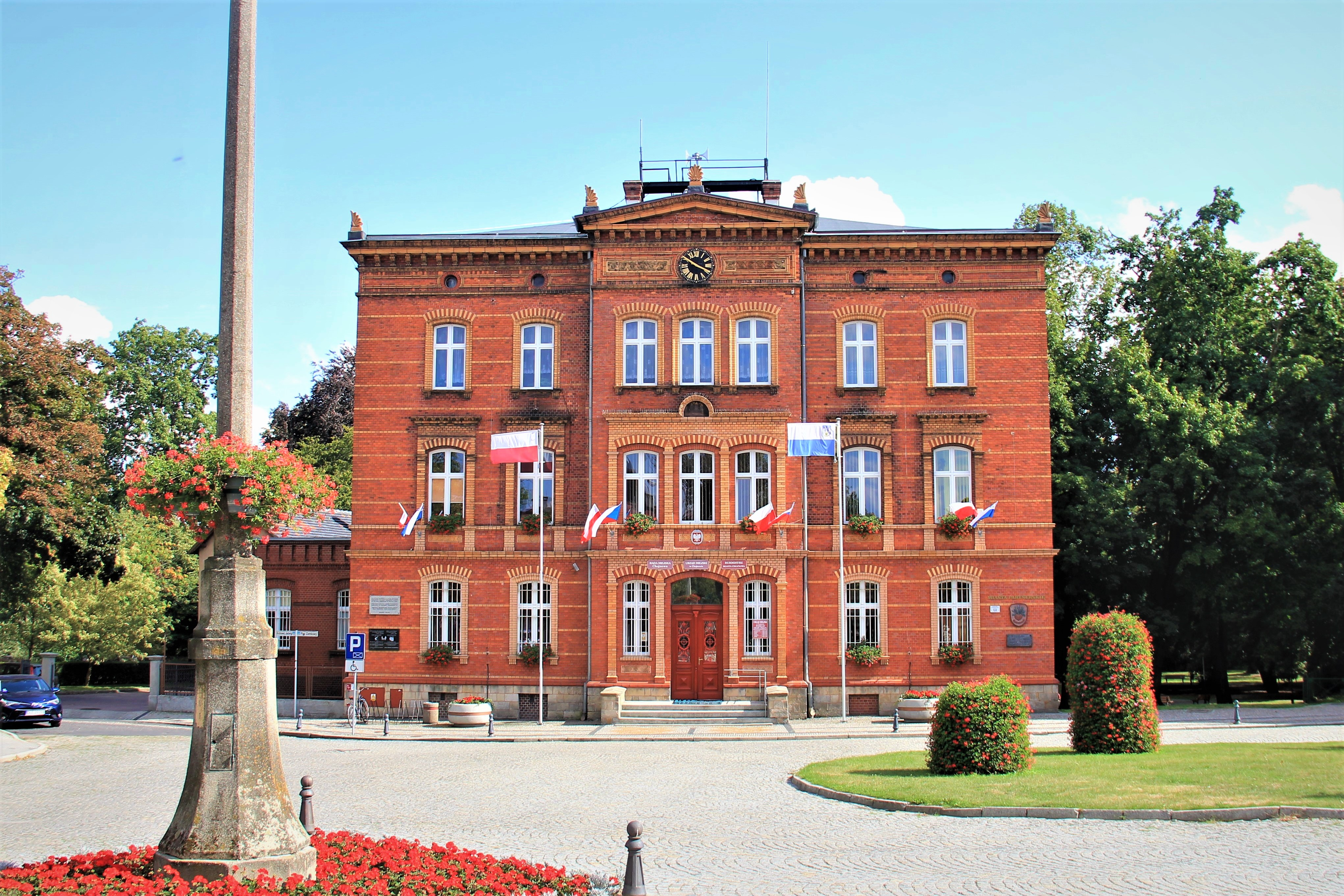
Town hall

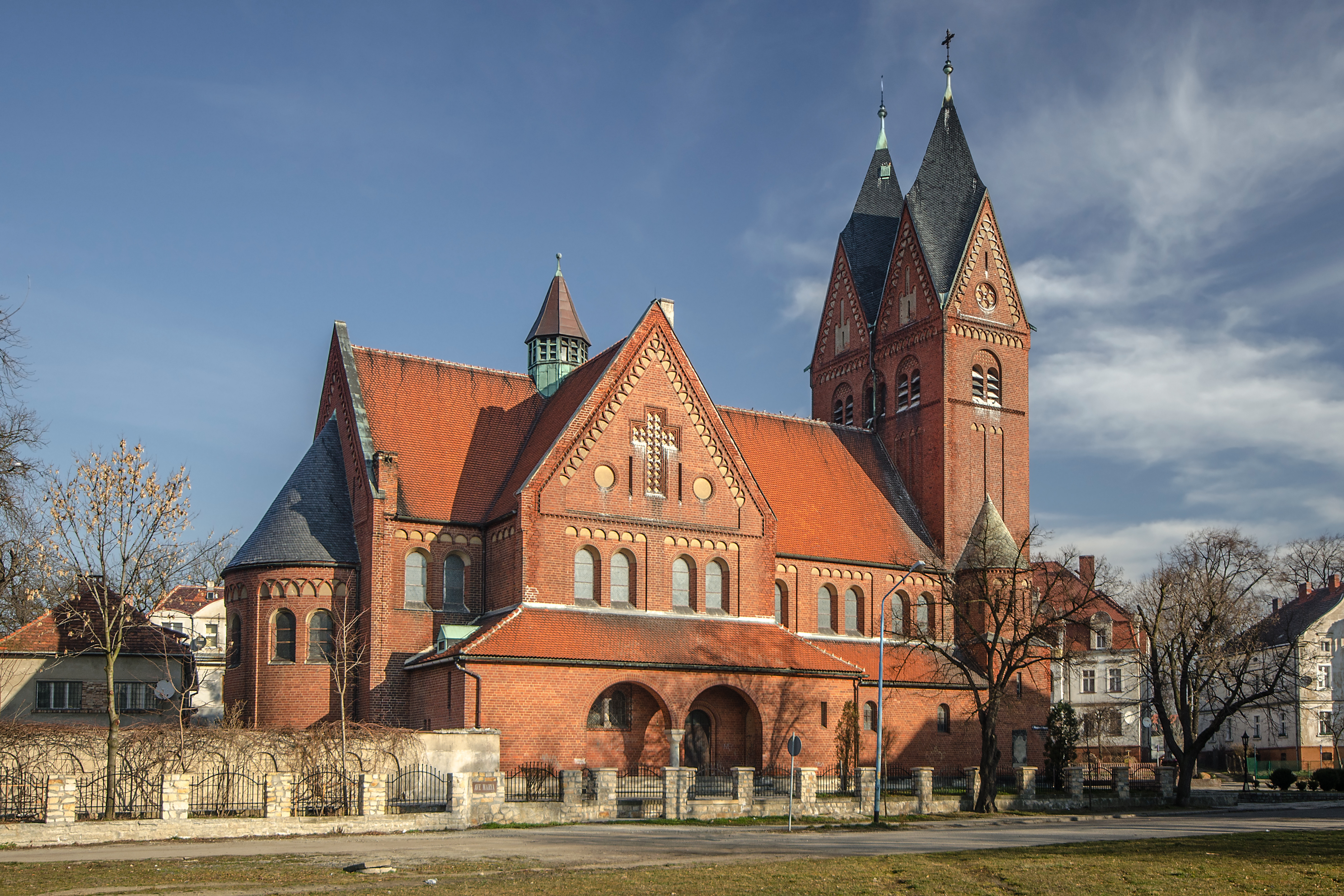
Immaculate Conception Church

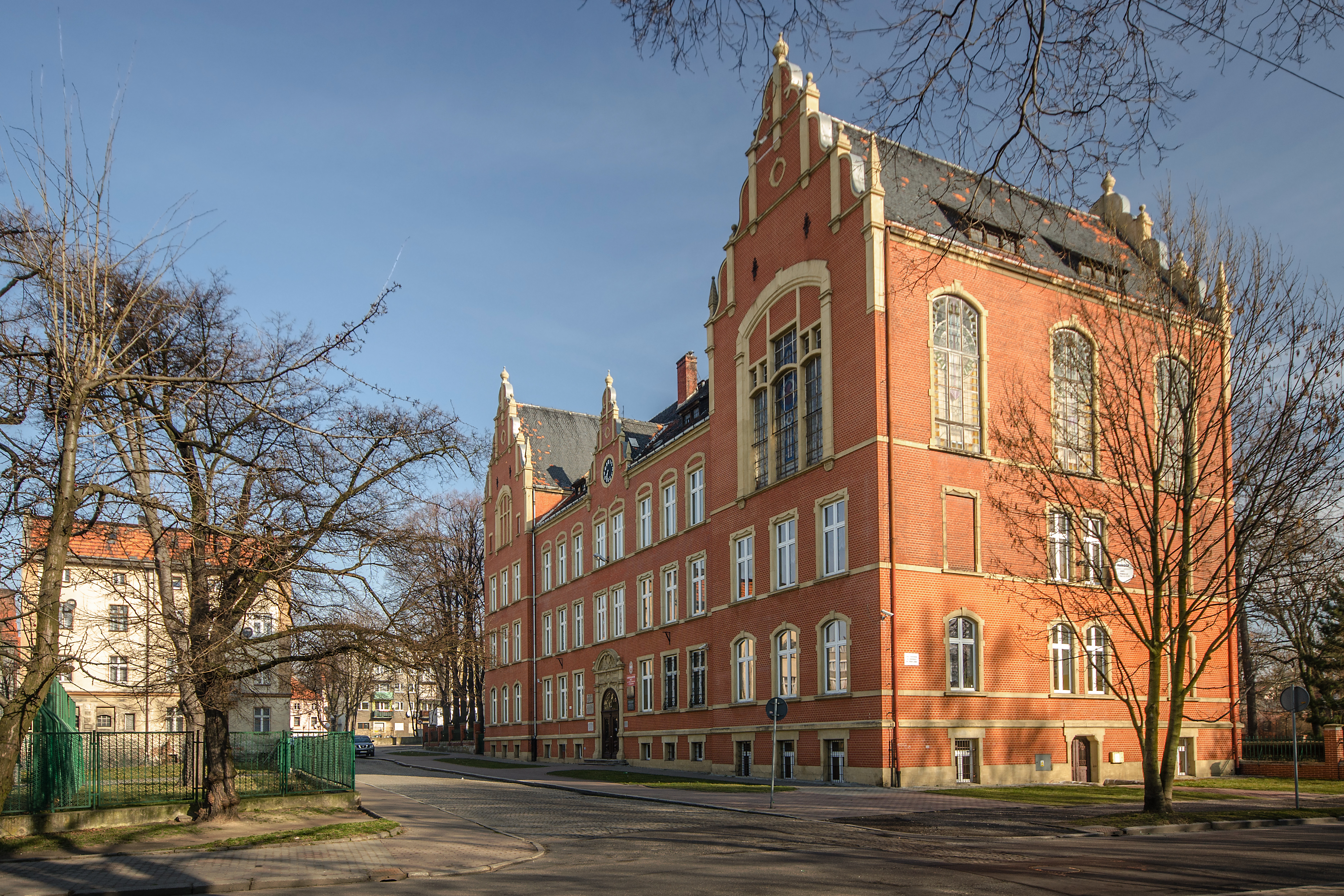
Nicolaus Copernicus Gymnasium No. 2

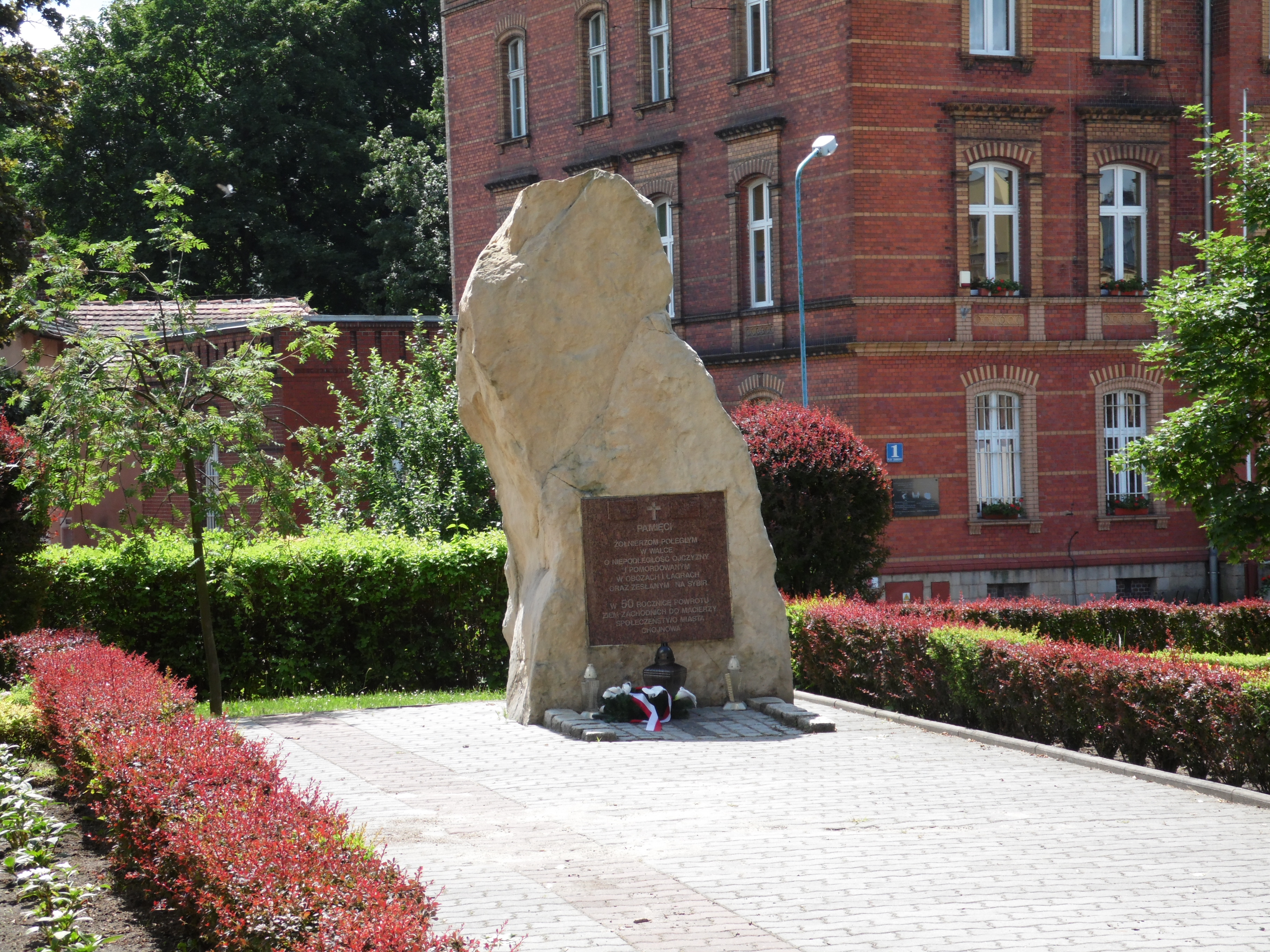
Monument to Polish soldiers killed in World War II and murdered in labour camps and exiled to Siberia

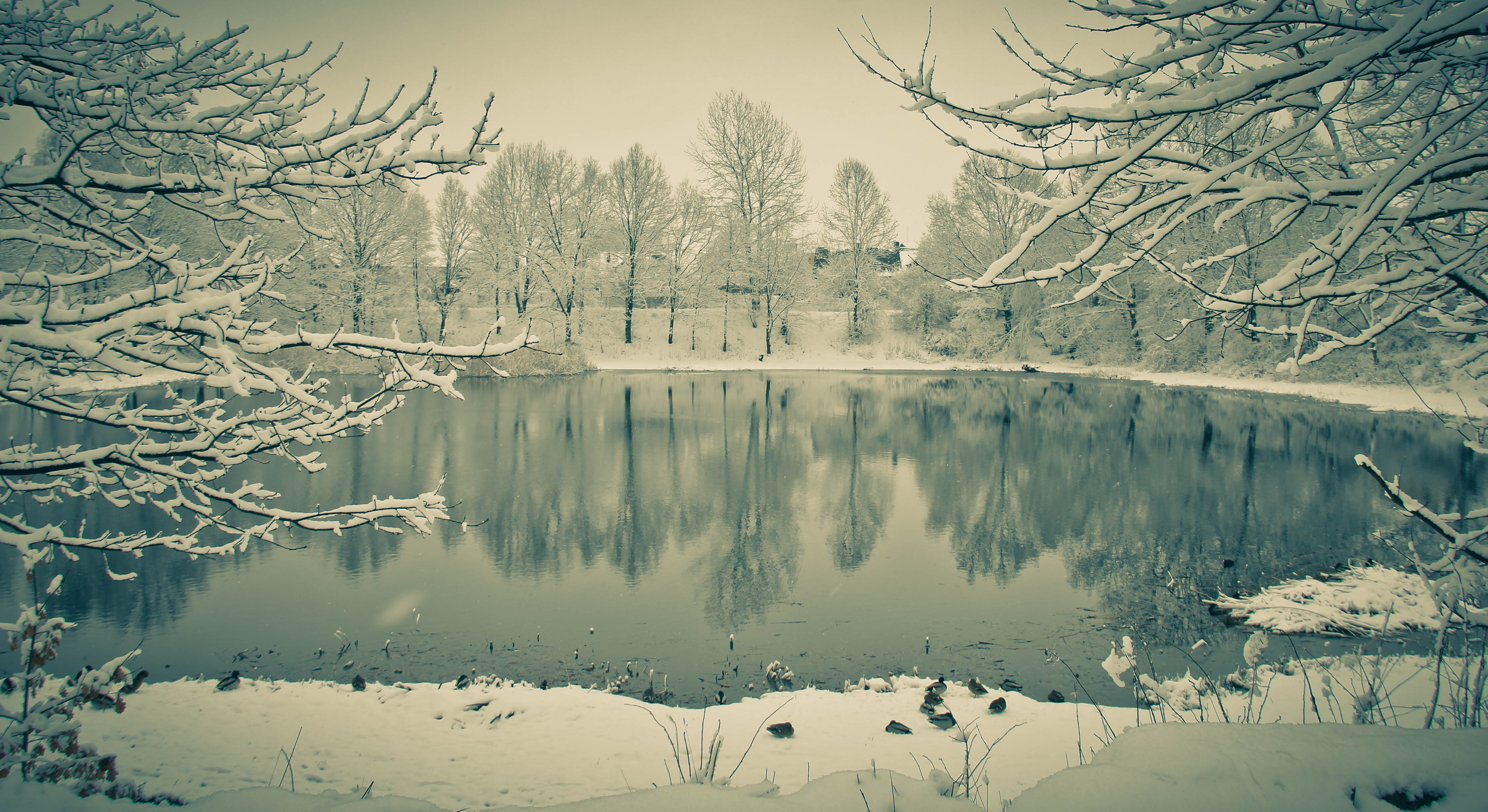
Swan's Pond (Łabędzi Staw) in winter

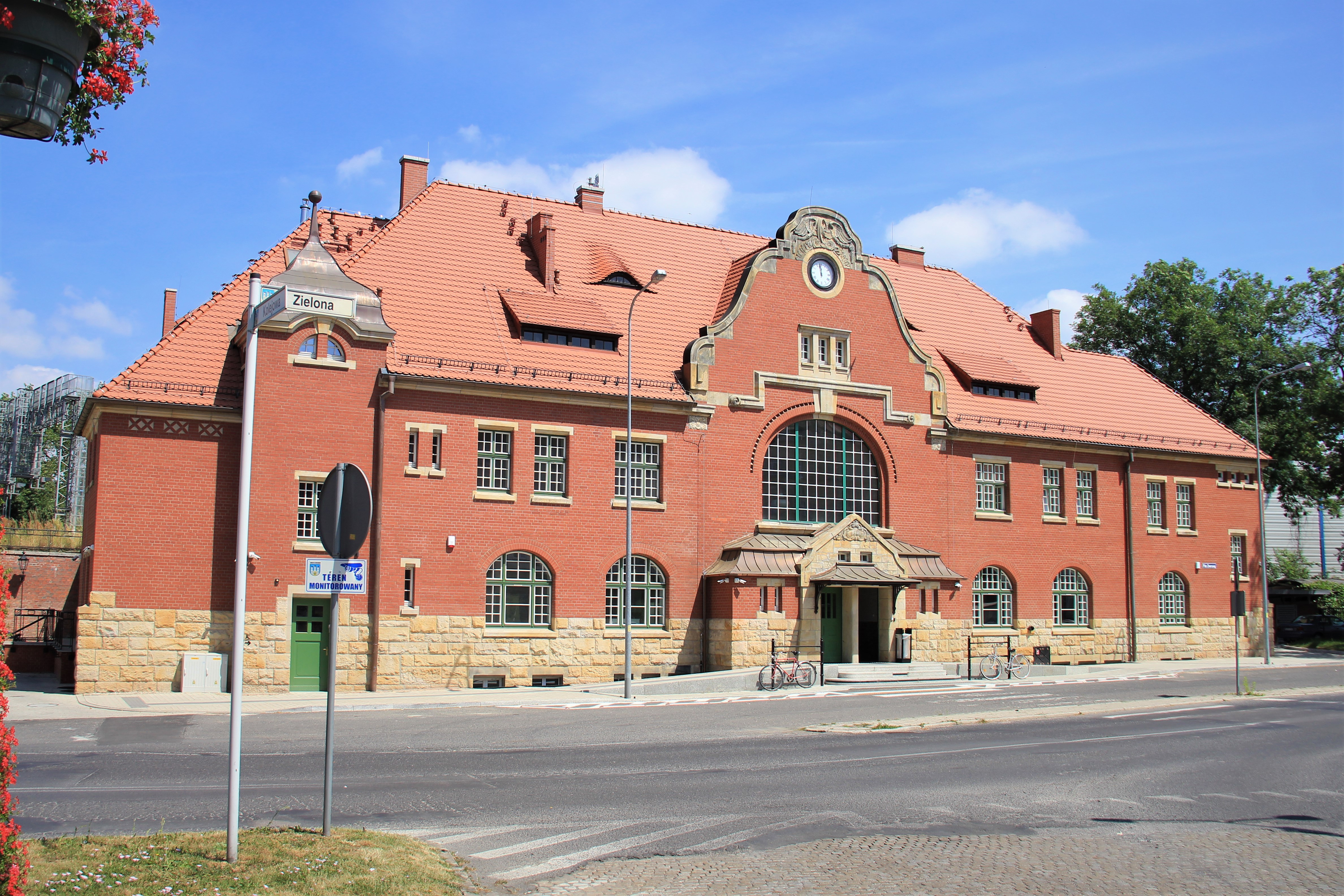
Chojnów Railway Station

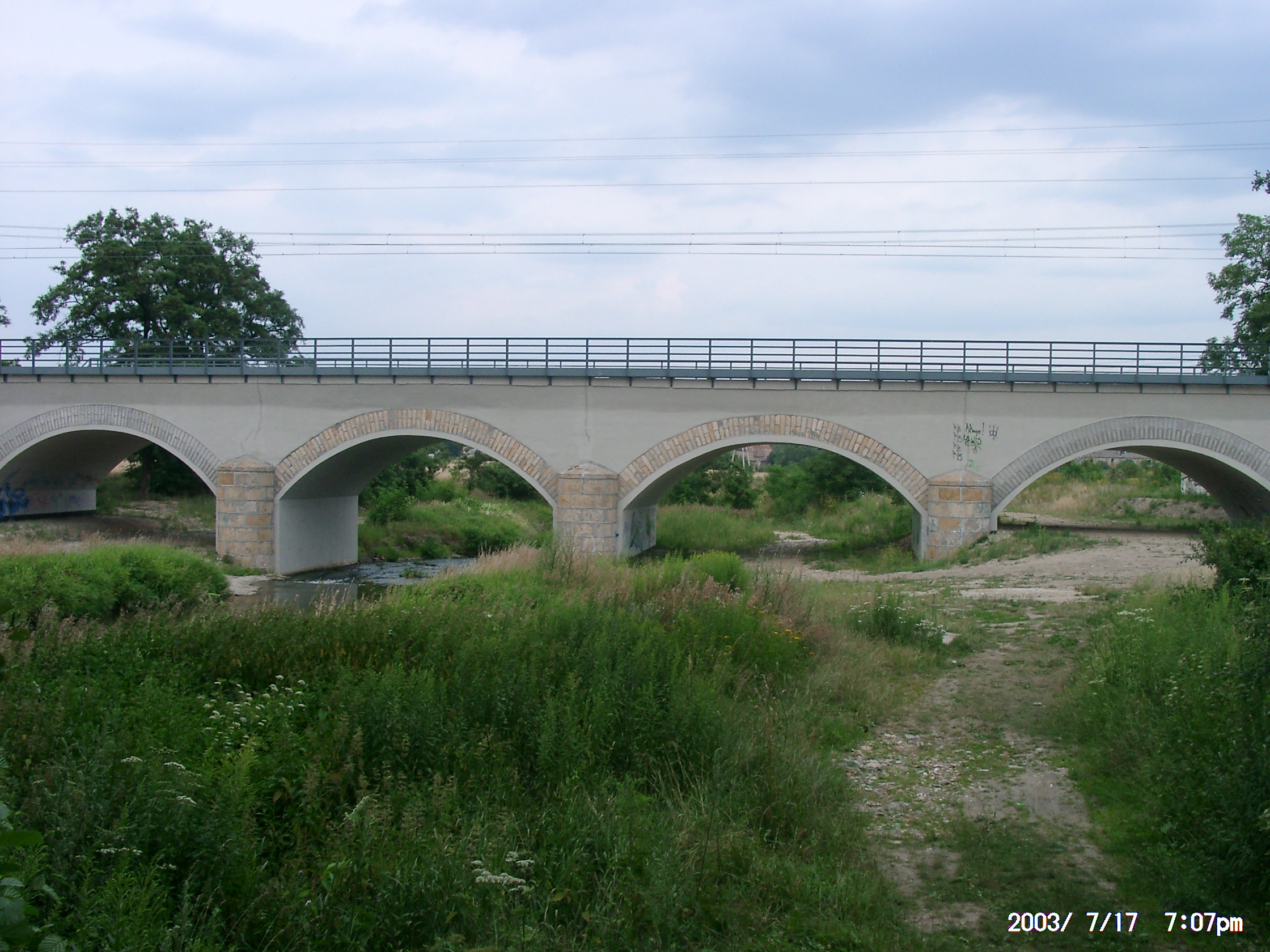
Railway bridge
