= Elisabeth Augusta Lindenov =

- Countess of Schleswig-Holstein
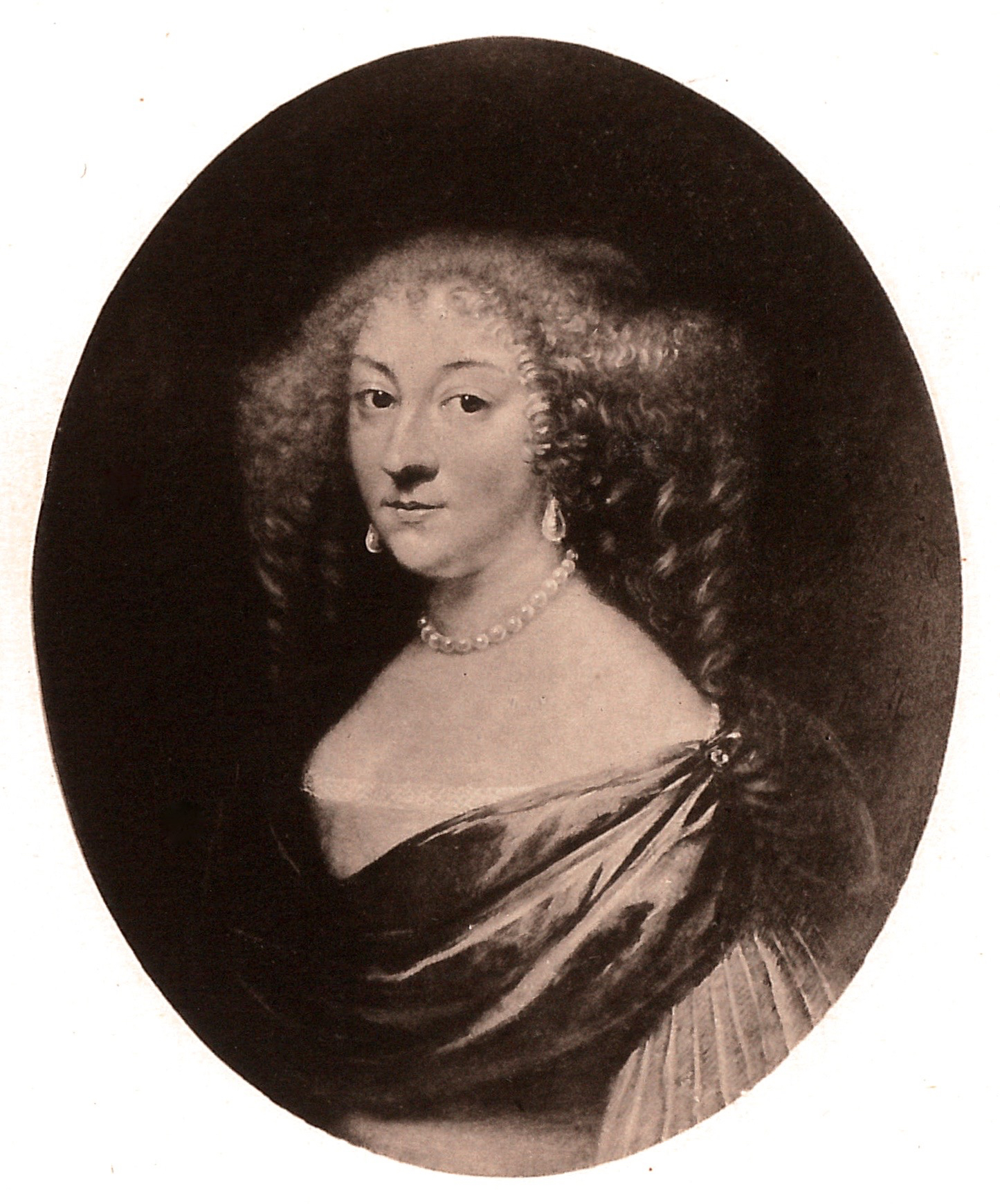
- Born: 28 December 1623
- Died: 9 August 1677 (aged 53)
- Spouse: Hans Lindenov
- Issue: Sophie Amalie Lindenov
- Father: Christian IV of Denmark
- Mother: Kirsten Munk

Elisabeth Augusta of Schleswig-Holstein (28 December 1623 – 9 August 1677) was the daughter of king Christian IV of Denmark and Kirsten Munk. She shared the title Countess of Schleswig-Holstein with her mother and siblings.

== Biography ==
As her siblings, she was raised by her grandmother Ellen Marsvin and the royal governess Karen Sehested, but spent 1628-29 at the Swedish court. She was married to Hans Lindenov (d. 1659) in 1639, and became the mother of Sophie Amalie Lindenov. She was described as a vulgar, constantly indebted gambler. She did not side with her sister Leonora Christina Ulfeldt during the conflict between Leonora and the king and was not close to her siblings. She was granted a royal pension in 1664, and was also granted many gifts by king Christian V, but continued to be haunted by debts during her life.

== Ancestry ==
Ancestors of Elisabeth Augusta Lindenov

16. Frederick I of Denmark
8. Christian III of Denmark
17. Anna of Brandenburg
4. Frederick II of Denmark
18. Magnus I, Duke of Saxe-Lauenburg
9. Dorothea of Saxe-Lauenburg
19. Catherine of Brunswick-Wolfenbüttel
2. Christian IV of Denmark
20. Albrecht VII, Duke of Mecklenburg
10. Ulrich, Duke of Mecklenburg
21. Anna of Brandenburg
5. Sophie of Mecklenburg-Güstrow
22. Frederick I of Denmark
11. Elizabeth of Denmark
23. Sophie of Pomerania
1. Elisabeth Augusta Lindenov
24. Mogens Olufsen Munk
12. Ludvik Mogensen Munk
25. Karen Ludvigsdatter Rosenkrantz
6. Ludvig Ludviksen Munk
26. Peder Hansen Lykke
13. Kirsten Pedersdatter Lykke
27. Kirsten Pedersdatter Høg; or Karen Pedersdatter Reventlow
3. Kirsten Munk
28. Peder Jørgensen Marsvin
14. Jørgen Pedersen Marsvin
29. Helle Tagesdatter Hollunger
7. Ellen Jørgensdatter Marsvin
30. Otte Henriksson Gyldenstierne
15. Karen Ottesdatter Gyldenstierne
31. Helvig Mogensdatter Gøye
