= Valdemar Christian of Schleswig-Holstein =

Danish noble

Valdemar Christian
- Count of Schleswig-Holstein
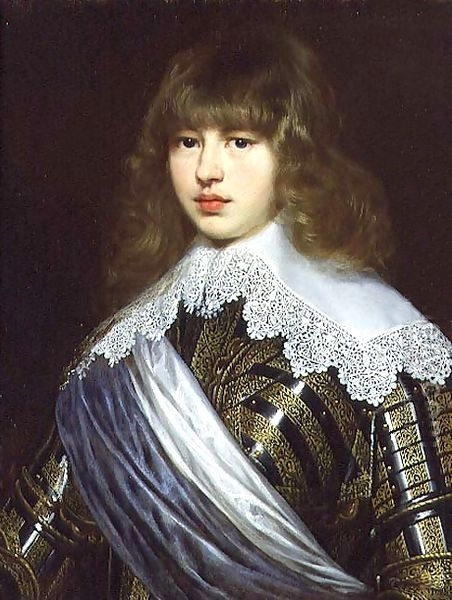
- Valdemar Christian of Schleswig-Holstein by Justus Sustermans
- Born: 26 June 1622; Frederiksborg Castle, Denmark
- Died: 29 February 1656 (aged 33); Lubin, Poland-Lithuania
- Noble family: Oldenburg
- Father: Christian IV of Denmark
- Mother: Kirsten Munk

Valdemar Christian of Schleswig-Holstein (Danish: Valdemar Christian til Slesvig og Holsten; 1622–29 February 1656) was the son of king Christian IV of Denmark and his morganatic spouse Kirsten Munk. He had the title Count of Schleswig-Holstein.

== Biography ==
Born as the youngest legitimate son of King Christian IV of Denmark, he had a tough childhood. His elder half-brother Ulrik had succeeded (under the name Ulrich III) his uncle as a bishop of Schwerin. He was raised under the supervision of the royal governess Karen Sehested. In 1643, he was sent to Russia to marry Irene of Russia, the daughter of Tsar Michael of Russia, but as he refused to convert to the Orthodox faith, he was kept prisoner until 1645. In 1648, he came into conflict with his half-brother Prince Frederik because of his wish to be elected king instead of Frederick, and after this, he lived abroad. He served in the Swedish army from 1655 and was killed in Poland in 1656.

== Ancestry ==
Ancestors of Valdemar Christian of Schleswig-Holstein

16. Frederick I of Denmark
8. Christian III of Denmark
17. Anna of Brandenburg
4. Frederick II of Denmark
18. Magnus I, Duke of Saxe-Lauenburg
9. Dorothea of Saxe-Lauenburg
19. Catherine of Brunswick-Wolfenbüttel
2. Christian IV of Denmark
20. Albrecht VII, Duke of Mecklenburg
10. Ulrich, Duke of Mecklenburg
21. Anna of Brandenburg
5. Sophie of Mecklenburg-Güstrow
22. Frederick I of Denmark
11. Elizabeth of Denmark
23. Sophie of Pomerania
1. Valdemar Christian of Schleswig-Holstein
24. Mogens Olufsen Munk
12. Ludvik Mogensen Munk
25. Karen Ludvigsdatter Rosenkrantz
6. Ludvig Ludviksen Munk
26. Peder Hansen Lykke
13. Kirsten Pedersdatter Lykke
3. Kirsten Munk
28. Peder Jørgensen Marsvin
14. Jørgen Pedersen Marsvin
29. Helle Tagesdatter Hollunger
7. Ellen Jørgensdatter Marsvin
30. Otte Henriksson Gyldenstierne
15. Karen Ottesdatter Gyldenstierne
31. Helvig Mogensdatter Gøye
