= Hedevig Ulfeldt =

Danish noble (1626–1678)

Hedwig of Schleswig-Holstein
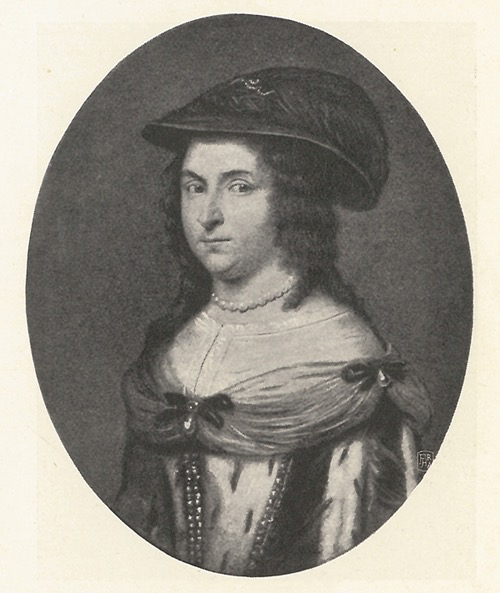
- Born: 15 June 1626; Denmark
- Died: 5 October 1678 (aged 52); Denmark
- Spouse: Ebbe Ulfeldt
- Parents: Christian IV of Denmark and Kirsten Munk

Hedwig of Schleswig-Holstein (15 July 1626 – 5 October 1678) was the daughter of king Christian IV of Denmark and Kirsten Munk. She was the twin of her sister Christiane Sehested. She shared the title Countess of Schleswig-Holstein with her mother and siblings.

As with her siblings, she was raised by her grandmother Ellen Marsvin and the royal governess Karen Sehested. She and her twin sister, Christiane, were both married in Copenhagen royal palace in 1642: she to the noble Ebbe Ulfeldt. She and her sister Leonora Christina Ulfeldt were the only siblings present at her father's deathbed in 1648. In 1652, her spouse was deposed from his position on Bornholm, and the couple left for the Swedish court. The marriage was unhappy: Ulfeldt abused her - she called him "the damned creature" - and she had an affair with his servant. She separated from him in 1655 and joined her sister Leonora in Pomerania. She was present at her mother's funeral in 1658. She was ruined by her husband's debts, and moved to his estate in Skåne in 1664 out of poverty. She visited her sister Leonora during her imprisonment, corresponded with her and worked for her release.

== Ancestry ==
Ancestors of Hedevig Ulfeldt

16. Frederick I of Denmark
8. Christian III of Denmark
17. Anna of Brandenburg
4. Frederick II of Denmark
18. Magnus I, Duke of Saxe-Lauenburg
9. Dorothea of Saxe-Lauenburg
19. Catherine of Brunswick-Wolfenbüttel
2. Christian IV of Denmark
20. Albrecht VII, Duke of Mecklenburg
10. Ulrich, Duke of Mecklenburg
21. Anna of Brandenburg
5. Sophie of Mecklenburg-Güstrow
22. Frederick I of Denmark
11. Elizabeth of Denmark
23. Sophie of Pomerania
1. Hedevig Ulfeldt
24. Mogens Olufsen Munk
12. Ludvik Mogensen Munk
25. Karen Ludvigsdatter Rosenkrantz
6. Ludvig Ludviksen Munk
26. Peder Hansen Lykke
13. Kirsten Pedersdatter Lykke
3. Kirsten Munk
28. Peder Jørgensen Marsvin
14. Jørgen Pedersen Marsvin
29. Helle Tagesdatter Hollunger
7. Ellen Jørgensdatter Marsvin
30. Otte Henriksson Gyldenstierne
15. Karen Ottesdatter Gyldenstierne
31. Helvig Mogensdatter Gøye
