= Sehested =

Sehested is a Danish surname, and may refer to:

== People ==
- Christen Thomesen Sehested, Danish Admiral
- Christian Christophersen Sehested, Danish politician
- Christiane Sehested, Danish royal
- Hannibal Sehested (council president), Danish politician
- Hannibal Sehested (governor), Danish statesman
- Hilda Sehested, Danish composer
- Karen Sehested, Danish court official
- Ove Ramel Sehested (1757–1838), Danish statesman

== Other ==
- Sehested Fjord, Greenland
- HDMS Sehested (P547), Danish ship
