= Dorothea Elisabeth Christiansdatter =

Dorothea Elisabeth of Schleswig-Holstein (1 September 1629 – 18 March 1687) was the daughter of king Christian IV of Denmark and his second morganatic wife, Kirsten Munk.

== Biography ==
As were her siblings, she was raised by her grandmother Ellen Marsvin. She was known as Miss leftover, as the king did not recognize her as his child, believing her to be the daughter of Rhinegrave Otto Ludwig of Salm-Kyrburg (1597–1634). Marsvin tried to have her recognized, but failed, and in 1637, she was sent to Hamburg and then to a convent school in Cologne. She converted to Roman Catholicism from Lutheranism, the religion of her parents, and became a nun there in 1646. She was legitimized in 1648.

== Ancestry ==
Ancestors of Dorothea Elisabeth Christiansdatter

16. Frederick I of Denmark
8. Christian III of Denmark
17. Anna of Brandenburg
4. Frederick II of Denmark
18. Magnus I, Duke of Saxe-Lauenburg
9. Dorothea of Saxe-Lauenburg
19. Catherine of Brunswick-Wolfenbüttel
2. Christian IV of Denmark
20. Albrecht VII, Duke of Mecklenburg
10. Ulrich, Duke of Mecklenburg
21. Anna of Brandenburg
5. Sophie of Mecklenburg-Güstrow
22. Frederick I of Denmark
11. Elizabeth of Denmark
23. Sophie of Pomerania
1. Dorothea Elisabeth Christiansdatter
24. Mogens Olufsen Munk
12. Ludvik Mogensen Munk
25. Karen Ludvigsdatter Rosenkrantz
6. Ludvig Ludviksen Munk
26. Peder Hansen Lykke
13. Kirsten Pedersdatter Lykke
27. Kirsten Pedersdatter Høg; or Karen Pedersdatter Reventlow
3. Kirsten Munk
28. Peder Jørgensen Marsvin
14. Jørgen Pedersen Marsvin
29. Helle Tagesdatter Hollunger
7. Ellen Jørgensdatter Marsvin
30. Otte Henriksson Gyldenstierne
15. Karen Ottesdatter Gyldenstierne
31. Helvig Mogensdatter Gøye
