= Christiane Sehested =

Daughter of king Christian IV of Denmark

Christiane Christiansdatter
- Countess of Schleswig-Holstein
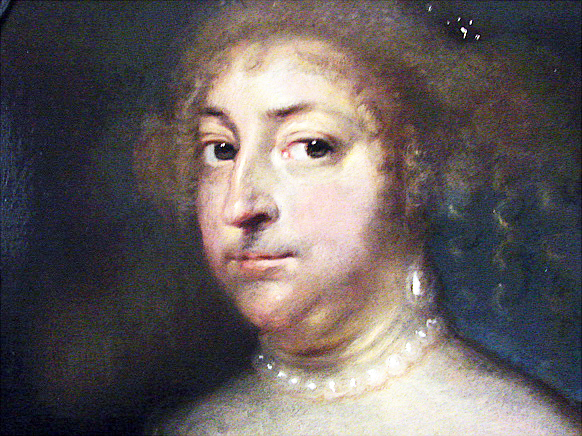
- Christiane Sehested, detail of painting by Abraham Wuchters, Frederiksborg castle
- Born: 15 July 1626
- Died: 1670 (aged 43–44)
- Spouse: Hannibal Sehested
- Father: Christian IV of Denmark
- Mother: Kirsten Munk

Christiane Christiansdatter Sehested (15 July 1626 – 1670) was the daughter of king Christian IV of Denmark and his morganatic spouse, Kirsten Munk. She shared the title Countess of Schleswig-Holstein with her mother and siblings. She was the twin of her sister Hedevig Ulfeldt.

== Biography ==
She was raised under the supervision of the royal governess Karen Sehested. Christiane was engaged by her father with the noble Hannibal Sehested, Viceroy of Norway, in 1636. She was married under great festivities in Copenhagen in 1642. She left for Norway with her spouse and lived with him in Akershus fortress in Oslo. Her father died in 1648. In 1651, her husband lost his position, and she was called to Copenhagen to sign a statement in which her spouse was deprived of his Norwegian estates. She also lost her status as countess. Her relationship with Sehested, and her siblings was not close, and in 1651–1658, she lived alone in poverty in Hamburg. She returned to Denmark in 1658 to side with the invading Swedes with her spouse to avenge the loss of her status; they joined the Swedish camp outside the sieged Danish capital. In 1660, Sehested regained the trust of the court, and in 1662, she was given back her personal status as countess. In 1666, she was widowed and retired to her estates.

She is known to have written several folk songs.

== Ancestry ==
Ancestors of Christiane Sehested

16. Frederick I of Denmark
8. Christian III of Denmark
17. Anna of Brandenburg
4. Frederick II of Denmark
18. Magnus I, Duke of Saxe-Lauenburg
9. Dorothea of Saxe-Lauenburg
19. Catherine of Brunswick-Wolfenbüttel
2. Christian IV of Denmark
20. Albrecht VII, Duke of Mecklenburg
10. Ulrich, Duke of Mecklenburg
21. Anna of Brandenburg
5. Sophie of Mecklenburg-Güstrow
22. Frederick I of Denmark
11. Elizabeth of Denmark
23. Sophie of Pomerania
1. Christiane Christiansdatter Sehested
24. Mogens Olufsen Munk
12. Ludvik Mogensen Munk
25. Karen Ludvigsdatter Rosenkrantz
6. Ludvig Ludviksen Munk
26. Peder Hansen Lykke
13. Kirsten Pedersdatter Lykke
3. Kirsten Munk
28. Peder Jørgensen Marsvin
14. Jørgen Pedersen Marsvin
29. Helle Tagesdatter Hollunger
7. Ellen Jørgensdatter Marsvin
30. Otte Henriksson Gyldenstierne
15. Karen Ottesdatter Gyldenstierne
31. Helvig Mogensdatter Gøye
