= Sophie Elisabeth Pentz =

Daughter of Christian IV of Denmark

- Countess of Schleswig-Holstein
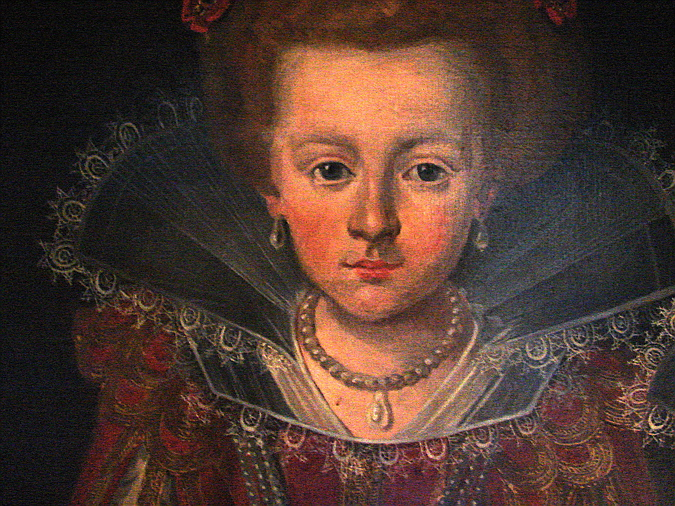
- Born: 20 September 1619; Skanderborg Castle, Denmark
- Died: 29 April 1657 (aged 37); Denmark
- Spouse: Christian von Pentz
- Issue: Armgaard Agnes von Pentz
- Father: Christian IV of Denmark
- Mother: Kirsten Munk

Sophie Elisabeth of Schleswig-Holstein (20 September 1619 – 29 April 1657) was a daughter of King Christian IV of Denmark and Kirsten Munk. She shared the title Countess of Schleswig-Holstein with her mother and siblings.

As were her siblings, she was raised by her grandmother Ellen Marsvin and then the supervision of the royal governess Karen Sehested. She was betrothed in 1620 and married on 10 October 1634 to Christian von Pentz, with whom she had one daughter Armgaard Agnes von Pentz.

She was her mother's favourite child, and her visits to her mother during her house arrest made her father prolong Kirsten's house arrest in 1646. Sophie Elisabeth sided with her sister Leonora Christina Ulfeldt in her conflict with the crown and took Leonora's son to her at the Swedish court in 1654. She returned to Denmark in 1656. Sophie Elisabeth is described as brutal and temperamental.
