= Music and Silence =

Historical novel by Rose Tremain

- First edition (publ. Chatto & Windus)
- Author: Rose Tremain
- Audio read by: Michael Praed, Clare Wille, and Alison Dowling
- Genre: Historical fiction
- Publication date: 1999
- ISBN: 978-0-701-17152-0

Music and Silence is a historical novel written by English author Rose Tremain. The audiobook, released in 2009, is narrated by Michael Praed, Clare Wille, and Alison Dowling.

Music and Silence is set in and around the court of Christian IV of Denmark in the years 1629 and 1630. The main historical event depicted is the end of Christian's second marriage, to Kirsten Munk, and the start of his third, to Vibeke Kruse. There are also numerous sub-plots and parallel stories, the main one being the love affair between two fictional characters, an English lutenist Peter Claire and Emilia Tilsen, a Danish servant of Kirsten's. In addition there are several references to Danish history and flashbacks to Christian's childhood and subsequent development.

== Reception ==
The book won the 1999 Whitbread Award for Novel.
