= Vibeke Kruse =

Mistress of Christian IV of Denmark

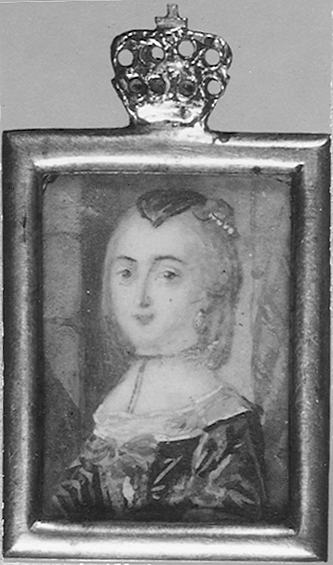
- Died: 1648
- Resting place: Kølstrup Church, Funen
- Partner: Christian IV of Denmark (1629–1648)
- Children: Ulrik Christian Gyldenløve; Elisabeth Sophie Gyldenløve

Vibeke Kruse (died 1648) was the official mistress of King Christian IV of Denmark between 1629 and 1648. They had two children: Ulrik Christian Gyldenløve(1630–1658) and Elisabeth Sophie Gyldenløve (November 26, 1633 – January 20, 1654). Christian openly acknowledged Kruse as his mistress and gave both of their children the surname Gyldenløve (lit. 'Golden Lion'), a naming practice used by Danish kings to acknowledge their illegitimate children.

She had particular influence over the king and as a result was the target of great criticism. Her two children were routinely pitted against the children of his second wife, Kirsten Munk.

== Relationship with Christian IV ==
Little is known of her background, but it is believed that Kruse's parents were from Holstein. She had been a servant of King Christian's second wife, Kirsten Munk. In 1628, Munk dismissed all of her servants in an effort to conceal her affair with Otto Ludwig von Salm. Following her dismissal, Kruse was employed by Munk's mother, Ellen Marsvin. In May 1629, Christian was invited by his mother-in-law to her estate, Kærstrup. While there he was introduced to Kruse, and she became the King's mistress after his separation from Munk the same year. It has been suggested that Marsvin encouraged this, perhaps to remain on good terms with the king. Others speculate that she plotted to use the affair to prevent her daughter's own infidelity from being blamed for the breakdown of their marriage.

Christian did not conceal his affair and openly acknowledged Kruse as his mistress. They had a very close relationship, with Kruse accompanying the king on his travels to Holstein and Norway. When the ship Trefoldigheden was being fitted for a journey in 1644, he had the room adjacent to his cabin furnished for her. When Christian was blinded in one eye at the Battle of Colberger Heide, Kruse kept the bloodstained pillow case that he had slept on the following night and had the cannon shot that wounded him turned into a pair of gold earrings.

As their relationship developed, the king granted her several properties. She was given an allowance of 500 rigsdaler in 1631, the estate Bramstedt in Holstein in 1633, a farm in Copenhagen in 1636, and a garden outside of Østerport in 1644. In 1645, the French ambassador reported that she had a great deal of influence on the King. In 1646, when the Crown Prince Frederick III asked his father for money, the king instructed his envoy to negotiate with Kruse.

== Conflict with Kirsten Munk ==
Kruse was blamed for having turned Christian against Munk, Marsvin, and his morganatic children. She was particularly despised by Corfitz Ulfeldt and his wife Leonora Christina Ulfeldt, who was one of his morganic children. Conflicts between Munk's children and the king boiled over in 1646, when Kruse's daughter Elizabeth Sophie was engaged to Claus von Ahlefeldt. Ahlefeldt was a powerful figure within the Danish nobility, and the engagement represented the elevation of the king's illegitimate line.

After the King's death in 1648, Corfitz Ulfeldt and Kirsten Munk tried to sue her. Although she was ill at time, they sealed her estates, turned her and her daughter out of the royal palace, and demanded an extrajudicial trial. The Riksråd denied their demands and the trial never occurred, but she died of natural causes shortly thereafter. The exact date of her death was not recorded, but she had certainly passed by 27 April 1648. Kruse's enemies saw to it that she was buried unnoticed and without ceremony. She was buried outside the city walls at a church near Nørreport on 3 May 1648. In 1652, her body was moved to Kølstrup Church on Funen.
