= Kirsten Munk =

Danish noble (1598–1658)

- Countess of Schleswig-Holstein
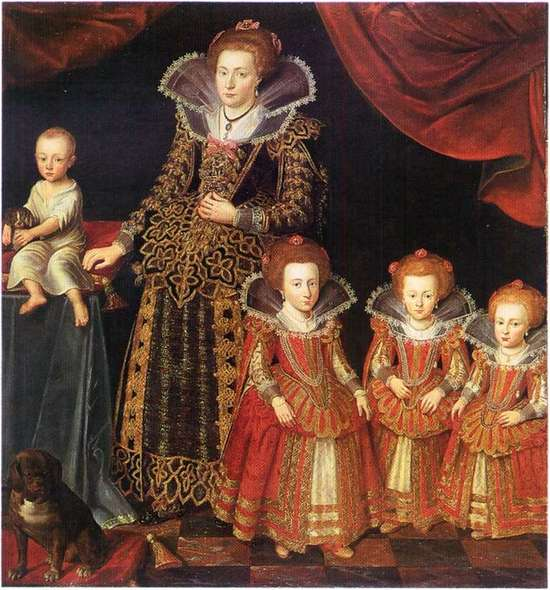
- Munk as portrayed by Jacob van Doordt in 1623
- Other names: Christina Munk
- Born: 6 July 1598
- Died: 19 April 1658 (aged 59)
- Noble family: Munk
- Spouse: Christian IV of Denmark (m. 1615; died 1648)
- Issue: Anne Cathrine of Schleswig-Holstein; Sophie Elisabeth of Schleswig-Holstein; Leonora Christina of Schleswig-Holstein; Valdemar Christian of Schleswig-Holstein; Elisabeth Auguste of Schleswig-Holstein; Friedrich Christian of Schleswig-Holstein; Christiane of Schleswig-Holstein; Hedwig of Schleswig-Holstein; Maria Katharina of Schleswig-Holstein; Dorothea Elisabeth of Schleswig-Holstein
- Father: Ludvig Munk
- Mother: Ellen Marsvin

Kirsten Munk (sometimes "Christina Munk"; 6 July 1598 – 19 April 1658) was a Danish noblewoman, who became the second spouse of King Christian IV of Denmark, and the mother of twelve of his children.

== Early life and morganatic marriage ==
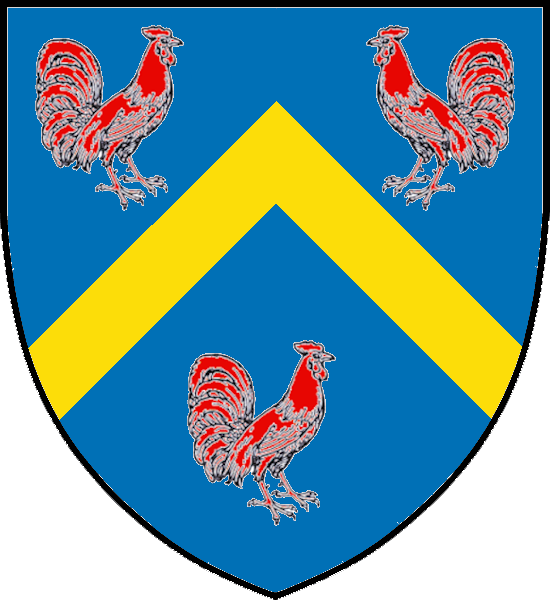
Coat of arms of the Munk noble family

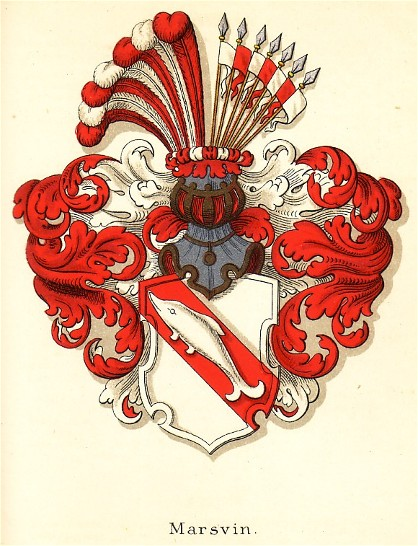
Coat of arms of the Marsvin family, Kirsten's maternal family

Kirsten Munk was the only surviving daughter of Ludvig Munk (1537–1602) and Ellen Marsvin (1572–1649), members of the wealthy, but untitled Danish nobility. Her mother, widowed a second time in 1611, was the greatest landowner on Funen.

Prior to yielding Kirsten to the evident desires of King Christian, her mother negotiated that, because Kirsten was a member of the nobility and not a commoner, she would become his wife rather than his mistress, and that she receive properties in her own name as tokens of the king's honourable intentions. On 31 December 1615, she was married morganatically to the widowed king, but not within a church. In 1627, she was given the title Countess of Schleswig-Holstein. Kirsten bore the king twelve children in just fourteen years, among them the countess Leonora Christina Ulfeldt.

== Children ==
Kirsten gave birth to 12 children, but only seven survived into mature adulthood. The youngest, Dorothea Elisabeth, was rumoured not to have been the king's child.

- Unnamed stillborn child (b. & d. 1615)
- Unnamed infant (b. & d. 1617)
- Countess Anne Cathrine of Schleswig-Holstein (10 August 1618 – 20 August 1633); married Frands Rantzau but died in adolescence.
- Countess Sophie Elisabeth of Schleswig-Holstein (20 September 1619 – 29 April 1657); married Christian von Pentz
- Countess Leonora Christina of Schleswig-Holstein (8 July 1621 – 16 March 1698); married Corfitz Ulfeldt
- Count Valdemar Christian of Schleswig-Holstein (1622 – 26 February 1656)
- Countess Elisabeth Auguste of Schleswig-Holstein (28 December 1623 – 9 August 1677); married Hans Lindenov
- Count Friedrich Christian of Schleswig-Holstein (26 April 1625 – 17 July 1627), died in early childhood.
- Countess Christiane of Schleswig-Holstein (15 July 1626 – 6 May 1670); married Hannibal Sehested
- Countess Hedwig of Schleswig-Holstein (15 July 1626 – 5 October 1678); married Ebbe Ulfeldt
- Countess Maria Katharina of Schleswig-Holstein (29 May 1628 – 1 September 1628), died in infancy.
- Countess Dorothea Elisabeth of Schleswig-Holstein (1 September 1629 – 18 March 1687)

Her children intermarried with the nobility of Denmark, Corfitz Ulfeldt and Hannibal Sehested being among her ambitious sons-in-law. From the king's death in 1648 to 1652, five of her daughters' husbands were known as the so-called Sons-in-law Party, wielding dominant influence in the Rigsråd. Previously, Kirsten's son Count Valdemar of Schleswig-Holstein, had shown promise, becoming engaged to Tsarevna Irina Mikhailovna Romanova, daughter of Michael I of Russia. The alliance was prevented by Danish objections to Valdemar's conversion to the Russian Orthodox Church, yet the king's disappointment on the betrothal's rupture was believed at the time to have hastened his death.

One of Kirsten's daughters, Countess Leonora Christina, distinguished herself with an international life, followed by imprisonment for decades in Denmark's royal dungeon and by the posthumous publication of her memoirs, still well-known both as Scandinavian prose and as early feminist literature.

Despite the turmoil of her parents' marriage and the conflicts between her brothers and brothers-in-law, according to her own writings Leonora Christina's youth and early married years at the Danish royal court were happy.

== Separation ==
As the king's health declined in 1625, so did his temperament and his marriage.

In 1627, Kirsten fell in love with a German cavalry captain in her husband's service, the Rhinegrave Otto Ludwig of Salm-Kyrburg (1597–1634). The couple are alleged to have had encounters at Funen, Kronborg, and Copenhagen. Eventually, word came to the king of his wife's affair. Supposedly, after seeing two maids sleeping outside her locked door, he got a footman to engrave the date on a stone and did not have sex with Kirsten again. Her last daughter was born 10 months after this and he refused to accept her as legitimate, instead calling her "Miss Leftover". In the end, he formally charged Kirsten with adultery, witchcraft, and consorting with a magician in Hamburg.

His mother-in-law sought to mitigate the king's indignation–several of her granddaughters were then engaged to marry Denmark's leading nobles–by encouraging him to engage in an affair with her daughter's lady-in-waiting, Vibeke Kruse. Although the king did father children with Kruse who later became political rivals of Kirsten Munck's children and in-laws, he continued with the divorce and exiled her to Jutland in 1629.

Kirsten herself refused to admit her adultery. After an interrogation, she was kept at Stjernholm in Horsens and then placed under house arrest in Boller in 1637. This confinement continued until 1647, allegedly owing to Vibeke Kruse's encouragement to the king to remain strict. However, Kirsten was never brought to trial despite repeated threats to that effect from the king and her good relationship with her children and in-laws led to their intercession with the king and the removal of her confinement.

== Later life ==
On his deathbed in 1648, her husband sent for her, but by the time she arrived he was already dead. Kirsten and her children then had Vibeke Kruse banished from court. She also had her marriage and children confirmed as legitimate, although morganatic.

The Sons-in-law Party spoke for her in the council 1648–51, and when it fell from power, she supported her son-in-law Corfitz Ulfeldt. Ulfeldt and her daughter Leonora sided with Sweden, and Kirsten Munk is alleged to have financed King Charles X of Sweden's invasion and occupation of Denmark-Norway. She died during the Swedish occupation and was given a grand funeral in Odense.

== Cultural references ==
The 2018 drama film Christian IV - Den sidste rejse describes the relationship between Christian IV (Bard Ove) and Kirsten Munk (Karen-Lise Mynster). The 1998 novel Music and Silence by Rose Tremain, is a fictionalized account of the disintegration of the relationship between Kirsten Munk and Christian IV, mirrored by a developing relationship between a young lady in waiting of Munk and a musician of the Royal Court.
