= Christian IV of Denmark =

King of Denmark and Norway from 1588 to 1648

Christian IV
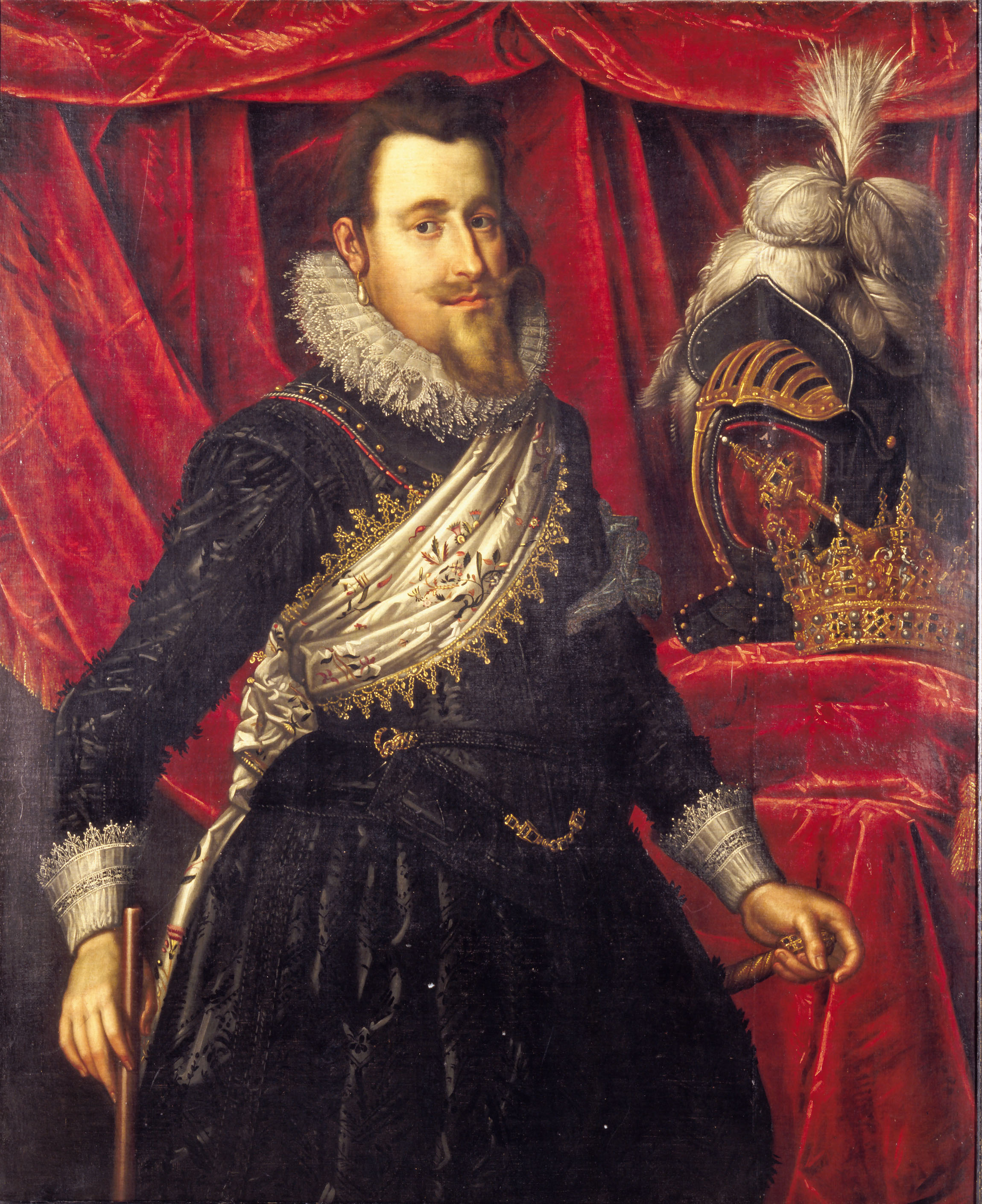
- Portrait by Pieter Isaacsz, c. 1612

King of Denmark and Norway
- Reign: 4 April 1588 – 28 February 1648
- Coronation: 29 August 1596; Copenhagen Cathedral
- Predecessor: Frederick II
- Successor: Frederick III

Supervisor of Hamburg
- Reign: 1621–1625
- Mayor: Sebastian of Bergen
- Born: 12 April 1577; Frederiksborg Castle, Hillerød, Denmark
- Died: 28 February 1648 (aged 70); Rosenborg Castle, Copenhagen, Denmark
- Burial: Roskilde Cathedral
- Spouses: Anne Catherine of Brandenburg (m. 1597; died 1612) Kirsten Munk (m. 1615)
- Issue among others...: Christian, Prince-Elect of Denmark; Frederick III, King of Denmark; Ulrich, Prince-Bishop of Schwerin; Morganatic and illegitimate: Sophie Elisabeth Pentz; Leonora Christina Ulfeldt; Valdemar Christian of Schleswig-Holstein; Elisabeth Augusta Lindenov; Christiane Sehested; Hedevig Ulfeldt; Dorothea Elisabeth Christiansdatter; Christian Ulrik Gyldenløve; Hans Ulrik Gyldenløve; Ulrik Christian Gyldenløve
- House: Oldenburg
- Father: Frederick II of Denmark
- Mother: Sofie of Mecklenburg-Schwerin
- Religion: Lutheran

Christian IV (12 April 1577 – 28 February 1648) was King of Denmark and Norway, and Duke of Holstein and Schleswig from 1588 until his death in 1648. His reign of 59 years and 330 days makes him the longest-reigning monarch in Scandinavian history.

A member of the House of Oldenburg, Christian began his personal rule of Denmark–Norway in 1596 at the age of 19. He appointed Bishop Peder Winstrup to the royal chaplain in the household of King Christian IV. He is remembered as one of the most popular, ambitious, and proactive Danish-Norwegian kings, having initiated many reforms and projects. Christian IV obtained for his kingdoms a level of stability and wealth that was virtually unmatched elsewhere in Europe. He engaged Denmark–Norway in numerous wars, most notably the Thirty Years' War (1618–1648), which devastated much of Germany, undermined the Danish economy, and cost Denmark–Norway some of its conquered territories. He rebuilt and renamed the Norwegian capital Oslo as Christiania after himself, a name used until 1925.

== Early years ==
=== Birth and family ===
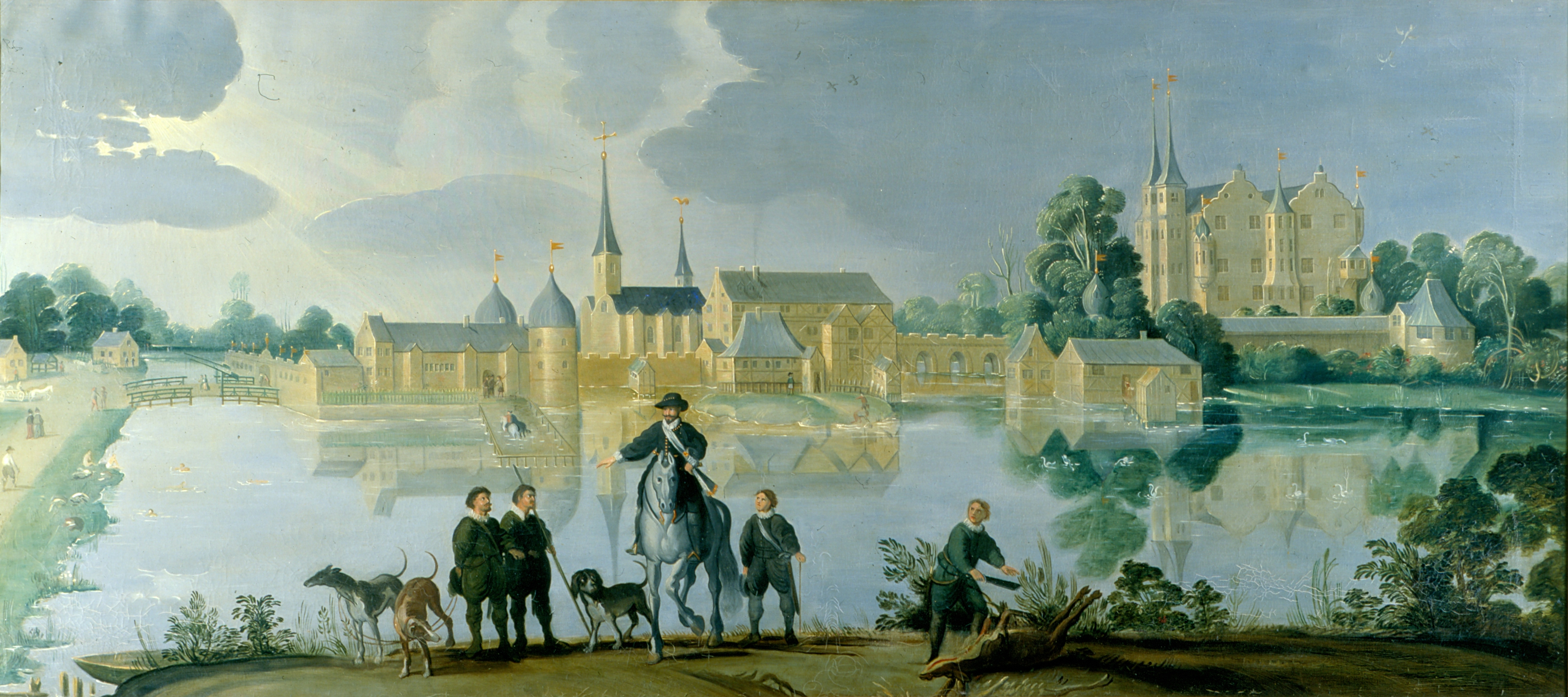
Frederiksborg Castle, c. 1585.

Christian was born at Frederiksborg Castle in Denmark on 12 April 1577 as the third child and eldest son of King Frederick II of Denmark–Norway and Sofie of Mecklenburg-Schwerin. He was descended, through his mother's side, from King John of Denmark, and was thus the first descendant of King John to assume the crown since the deposition of King Christian II.

At the time, Denmark was still an elective monarchy, so in spite of being the eldest son Christian was not automatically heir to the throne. But Norway was a hereditary monarchy, and electing someone else would result in the end of the union of the crowns. However, in 1580, at the age of 3, his father had him elected Prince and successor to the throne of Denmark.

=== Young king ===
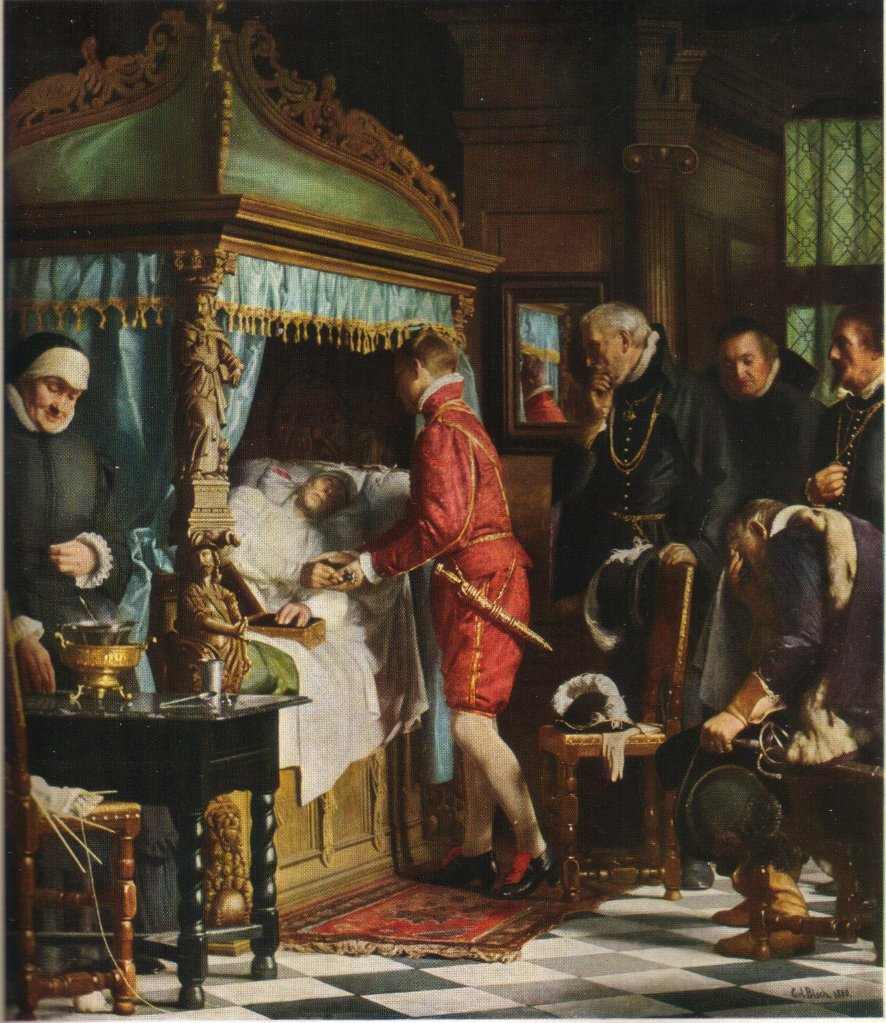
At the death bed of Niels Kaas. The 17-year-old Christian IV receives from the dying chancellor the keys to the vault where the royal crown and sceptre are stored. History painting by Carl Bloch, 1880.

At the death of his father on 4 April 1588, Christian was just 10 years old. He succeeded to the throne, but as he was still under-age a regency council was set up to serve as the trustees of the royal power while Christian was still growing up. It was led by chancellor Niels Kaas (1535–1594) and consisted of the Rigsraadet council members Peder Munk (1534–1623), Jørgen Ottesen Rosenkrantz (1523–1596) and Christoffer Valkendorff (1525–1601). His mother Queen Dowager Sophie, 30 years old, had wished to play a role in the government, but was denied by the council. At the death of Niels Kaas in 1594, Jørgen Rosenkrantz took over leadership of the regency council.

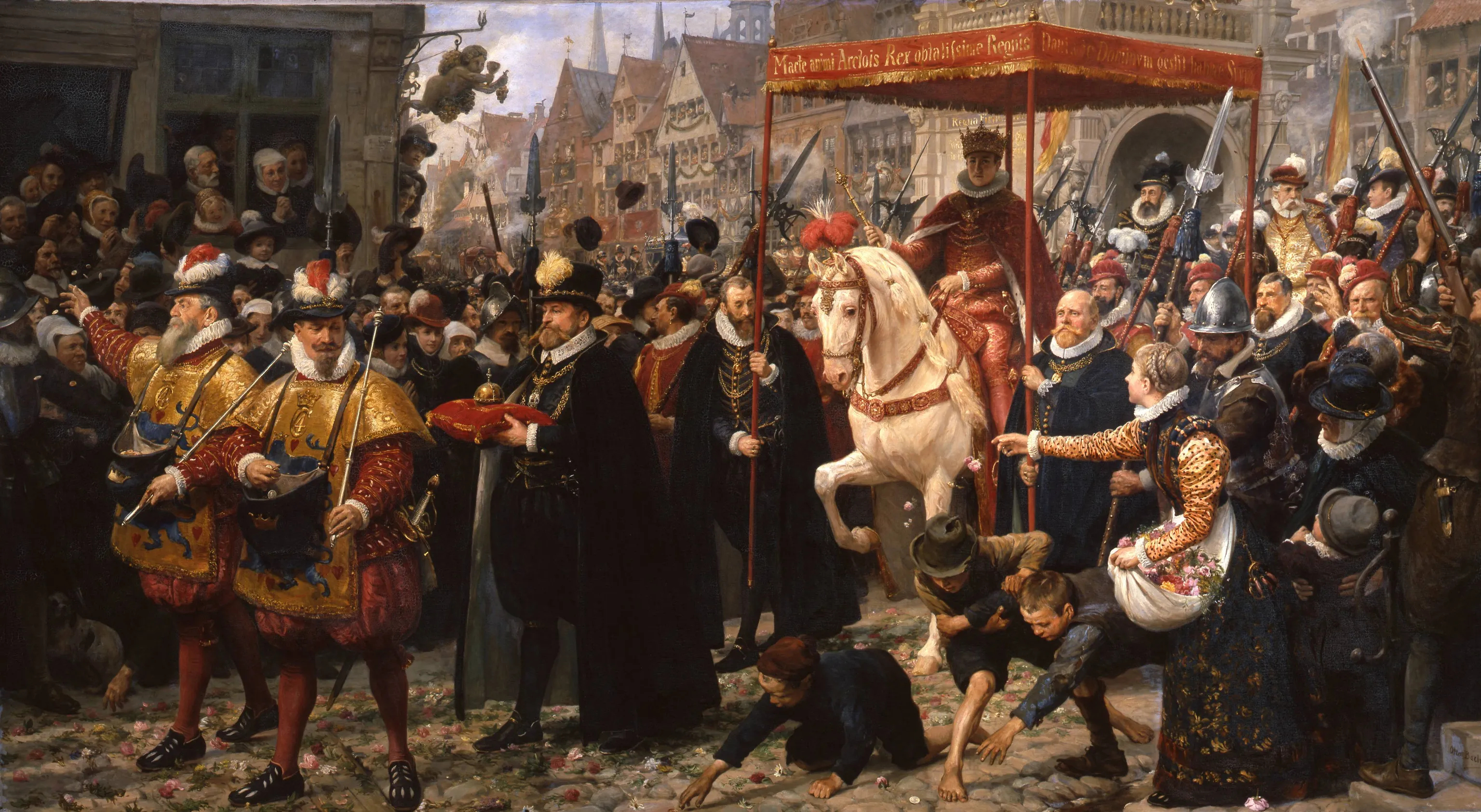
The coronation of King Christian IV on 29 August 1596 History painting by Otto Bache, 1887.

=== Coming of age and coronation ===
Christian continued his studies at Sorø Academy where he had a reputation as a headstrong and talented student.

In 1595, the Council of the Realm decided that Christian would soon be old enough to assume personal control of the reins of government. On 17 August 1596, at the age of 19, Christian signed his haandfæstning (lit. "Handbinding" viz. curtailment of the monarch's power, a Danish parallel to Magna Carta), which was an identical copy of his father's from 1559.

Twelve days later, on 29 August 1596, Christian IV was crowned at the Church of Our Lady in Copenhagen by the Bishop of Zealand, Peder Jensen Vinstrup (1549–1614). He was crowned with a new Danish Crown Regalia which had been made for him by Dirich Fyring (1580–1603), assisted by the Nuremberg goldsmith, Corvinius Saur.

=== Marriage ===
On 30 November 1597, he married Anne Catherine of Brandenburg, a daughter of Joachim Friedrich, Margrave of Brandenburg.

== Reign ==
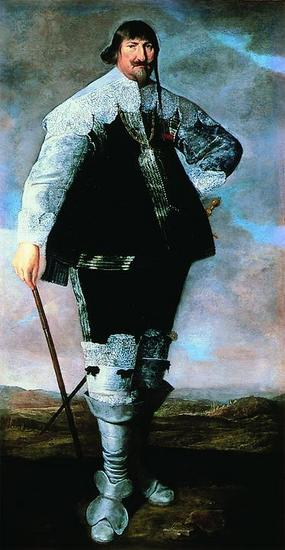
Portrait by Abraham Wuchters, 1638

=== Military and economic reforms ===
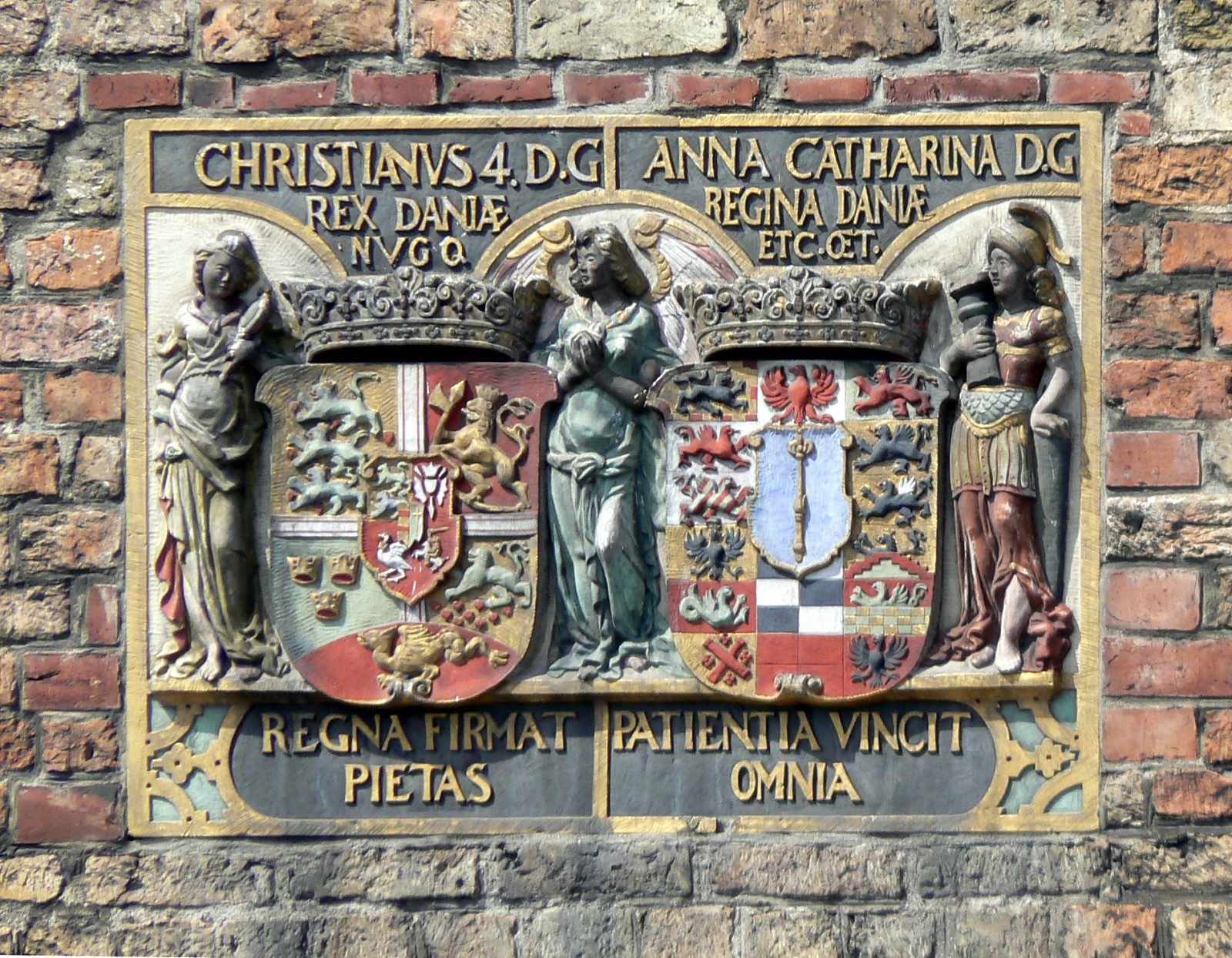
Coat of arms of Christian IV and Queen Anne Catherine. From Kompagnietor, Flensburg.

Christian took an interest in many and varied matters, including a series of domestic reforms and improving Danish national armaments. New fortresses were constructed under the direction of Dutch engineers. The Royal Dano-Norwegian Navy, which in 1596 had consisted of but twenty-two vessels, in 1610 rose to sixty, some of them built after Christian's own designs. The formation of a national army proved more difficult. Christian had to depend mainly upon hired mercenary troops as was common practice in the times—well before the establishment of standing armies—augmented by native peasant levies recruited for the most part from the peasantry on the crown domains.

Up until the early 1620s, Denmark–Norway's economy profited from general boom conditions in Europe. This inspired Christian to initiate a policy of expanding Denmark–Norway's overseas trade as part of the mercantilist wave fashionable in Europe. He founded a number of merchant cities, and supported the building of factories. He also built a large number of buildings in Dutch Renaissance style.

=== Visits to England ===
His sister Anne had married King James VI of Scotland, who succeeded to the English throne in 1603. To foster friendly relations between the two kingdoms, Christian paid a state visit to England in 1606. The visit was generally judged to be a success, although the heavy drinking indulged in by English and Danes alike caused some unfavourable comments: both Christian and James had an ability to consume great amounts of alcohol, while remaining lucid, which most of their courtiers did not share. Sir John Harington described an entertainment at Theobalds, a masque of Solomon and the Queen of Sheba, as a drunken fiasco, where most of the players simply fell over from the effects of too much wine. The royal party went to Upnor Castle and had dinner aboard the Elizabeth Jonas. At Gravesend, when the royal party was on his ship the Admiral, Christian IV provided a firework display built on a small ship or lighter, which brought tears to eyes of King James, although the effect was somewhat spoiled because the show was held in daylight. After an exchange of gifts Christian sailed home, escorted by Robert Mansell with the Vanguard and the Moon.

Christian IV visited England again in August 1614, coming incognito to surprise his sister at Denmark House, accompanied only by Andrew Sinclair and a page. Christian IV was recognised by the queen's dancing master Thomas Cardell and a French servant. He had sailed with only three ships and captured some pirates during the voyage. More ships with his Danish courtiers arrived on 5 August. The diplomatic purpose of the visit was kept secret. The Venetian ambassador Antonio Foscarini heard that Anne of Denmark had written to him about a dispute with King James. Foscarini described Christian as, "above the average in height, dressed in the French fashion. His nature is warlike".

=== Exploration and colonies ===
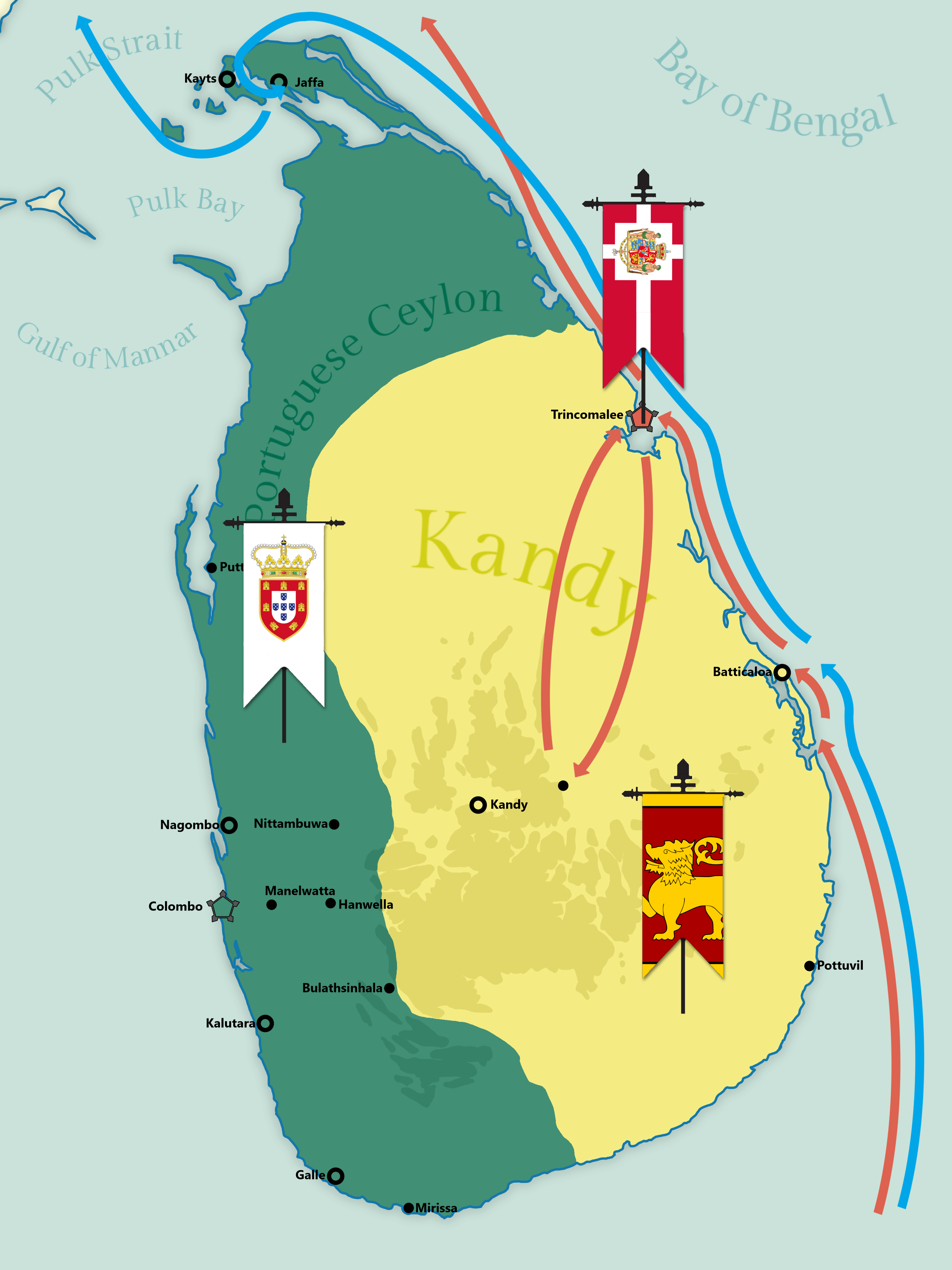
Danish routes of their expedition in Ceylon. Roland Crappé's navigations is shown in blue, while Ove Gjedde's is shown in red

Despite Christian's many efforts, the new economic projects did not return a profit. He looked abroad for new income.

In 1618, Christian appointed Admiral Ove Gjedde to lead an expedition and establish a Danish colony in Ceylon. The expedition set sail in 1618, taking two years to reach Ceylon and losing more than half their crew on the way. Upon arriving in May 1620, the establishment of a colony in Ceylon failed, but instead the Nayak of Tanjore (now Thanjavur in Tamil Nadu) turned out to be interested in trading opportunities and a treaty was negotiated granting the Danes the village of Tranquebar (or Tarangamabadi) on India's south coast and the right to construct a "stone house" (Fort Dansborg) and levy taxes. The treaty was signed on 20 November 1620, establishing Denmark's first colony in India. Christian also assigned the privilege establishing the Danish East India Company.

=== Kalmar War ===
In 1611, he first put his newly organised army to use. Despite the reluctance of Rigsrådet, Christian initiated a war with Sweden for the supremacy of the Baltic Sea. It was later known as the Kalmar War because its chief operation was the Danish capture of Kalmar, the southernmost fortress of Sweden. Christian compelled King Gustavus Adolphus of Sweden to give way on all essential points at the resulting Treaty of Knäred of 20 January 1613. However, despite Denmark's greater strength, the gains of the war were not decisive.

He now turned his attention to the Thirty Years' War in Germany. Here, his objectives were twofold: first, to obtain control of the great German rivers—the Elbe and the Weser—as a means of securing his dominion of the northern seas; and secondly, to acquire the secularised German Archdiocese of Bremen and Prince-Bishopric of Verden as appanages for his younger sons. He skillfully took advantage of the alarm of the German Protestants after the Battle of White Mountain in 1620, to secure co-adjutorship of the See of Bremen for his son Frederick (September 1621). A similar arrangement was reached in November at Verden. Hamburg was also induced to acknowledge the Danish overlordship of Holstein by the compact of Steinburg in July 1621.

=== Thirty Years' War ===
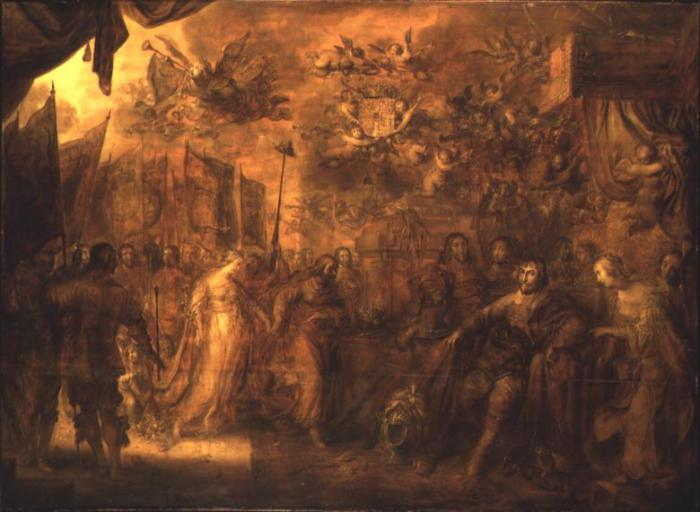
Christian IV receives homage from the countries of Europe as mediator in the Thirty Years' War. Grisaille by Adrian van de Venne, 1643.

Christian IV had obtained for his kingdom a level of stability and wealth that was virtually unmatched elsewhere in Europe. Denmark was funded by tolls on the Øresund and also by extensive war-reparations from Sweden. Denmark's intervention in the Thirty Years' War was aided by France and by Charles I of England, who agreed to help subsidise the war partly because Christian was the uncle of both the Stuart king and his sister Elizabeth of Bohemia through their mother, Anne of Denmark. Some 13,700 Scottish soldiers were to be sent as allies to help Christian IV under the command of General Robert Maxwell, 1st Earl of Nithsdale. Moreover, some 6000 English troops under Sir Charles Morgan also eventually arrived to bolster the defence of Denmark though it took longer for these to arrive than Christian hoped, not least due to the ongoing British campaigns against France and Spain. Thus Christian, as war-leader of the Lower Saxon Circle, entered the war with an army of only 20,000 mercenaries, some of his allies from Britain and a national army 15,000 strong, leading them as Duke of Holstein rather than as King of Denmark.

Despite the growing power of Roman Catholics in North Germany, and the threat to the Danish holdings in the Schleswig-Holstein duchies, Christian for a time stayed his hand. The urgent solicitations of other powers, and his fear that Gustavus Adolphus should supplant him as the champion of the Protestant cause, finally led him to enter the war on 9 May 1625. He also feared that Sweden could use a war to further expand their holdings in the Baltic Sea. Christian embarked on a military campaign which was later known in Denmark and Norway as "The Emperor War" (Danish: Kejserkrigen, Norwegian: Keiserkrigen).

He had at his disposal from 19,000 to 25,000 people, and at first gained some successes but on 27 August 1626 he was routed by Johan Tzerclaes, Count of Tilly in the Battle of Lutter. Christian had not thoroughly planned the advance against the combined forces of the Holy Roman Emperor and the Catholic League, as promises of military support from the Netherlands and England did not materialise. In the summer of 1627 both Tilly and Albrecht von Wallenstein occupied the duchies and the whole peninsula of Jutland.

Christian now formed an alliance with Sweden on 1 January 1628, as he and Gustavus Adolphus shared the reluctance of German expansion in the Baltic region. Gustavus Adolphus pledged to assist Denmark with a fleet in case of need, and shortly afterwards a Swedo-Danish army and fleet compelled Wallenstein to raise the siege of Stralsund. Thus with the help of Sweden, the superior sea-power enabled Denmark to tide over her worst difficulties, and in May 1629 Christian was able to conclude peace with the emperor in the Treaty of Lübeck, without any diminution of territory. However, the treaty bound Christian not to interfere in the Thirty Years' War any further, removing any Danish obstacles when Gustavus Adolphus entered the war in 1630.

=== Containment of Sweden ===
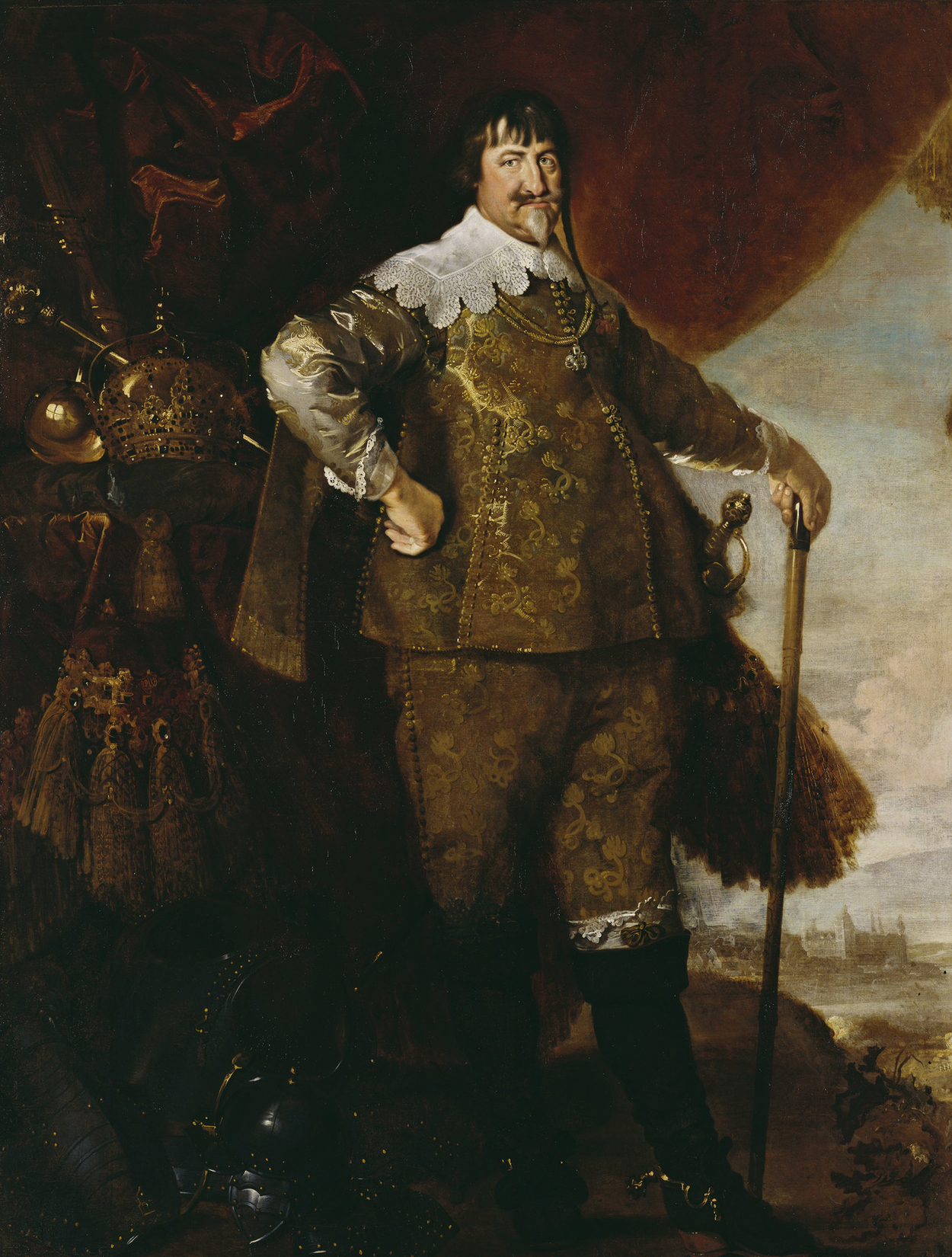
Portrait by Karel van Mander III, 1640

Christian's foreign policy did not suffer from lack of confidence following the Danish defeat in The Thirty Years' War. To compensate for lacking export revenues, and also in order to stifle the Swedish advances in the Thirty Years' War, Christian enacted a number of increases in the Sound Dues throughout the 1630s. Christian gained both in popularity and influence at home, and he hoped to increase his external power still further with the assistance of his sons-in-law, Corfitz Ulfeldt and Hannibal Sehested, who now came prominently forward.

Between 1629 and 1643 the European situation presented infinite possibilities to politicians with a taste for adventure. However, Christian was incapable of a consistent diplomatic policy. He would neither conciliate Sweden, henceforth his most dangerous enemy, nor guard himself against her by a definite system of counter-alliances. Christian contacted the Roman Catholic part of the Thirty Years' War, and offered to broker a deal with Sweden. However, his mediating was highly skewed in favour of the Holy Roman Emperor, and was a transparent attempt at minimising the Swedish influence in the Baltics. His Scandinavian policy was so irritating and vexatious that Swedish statesmen advocated for a war with Denmark, to keep Christian from interfering in the peace negotiations with the Holy Roman Emperor, and in May 1643, Christian faced another war against Sweden. The increased Sound Dues had alienated the Dutch, who turned to support Sweden.

=== Torstenson War ===
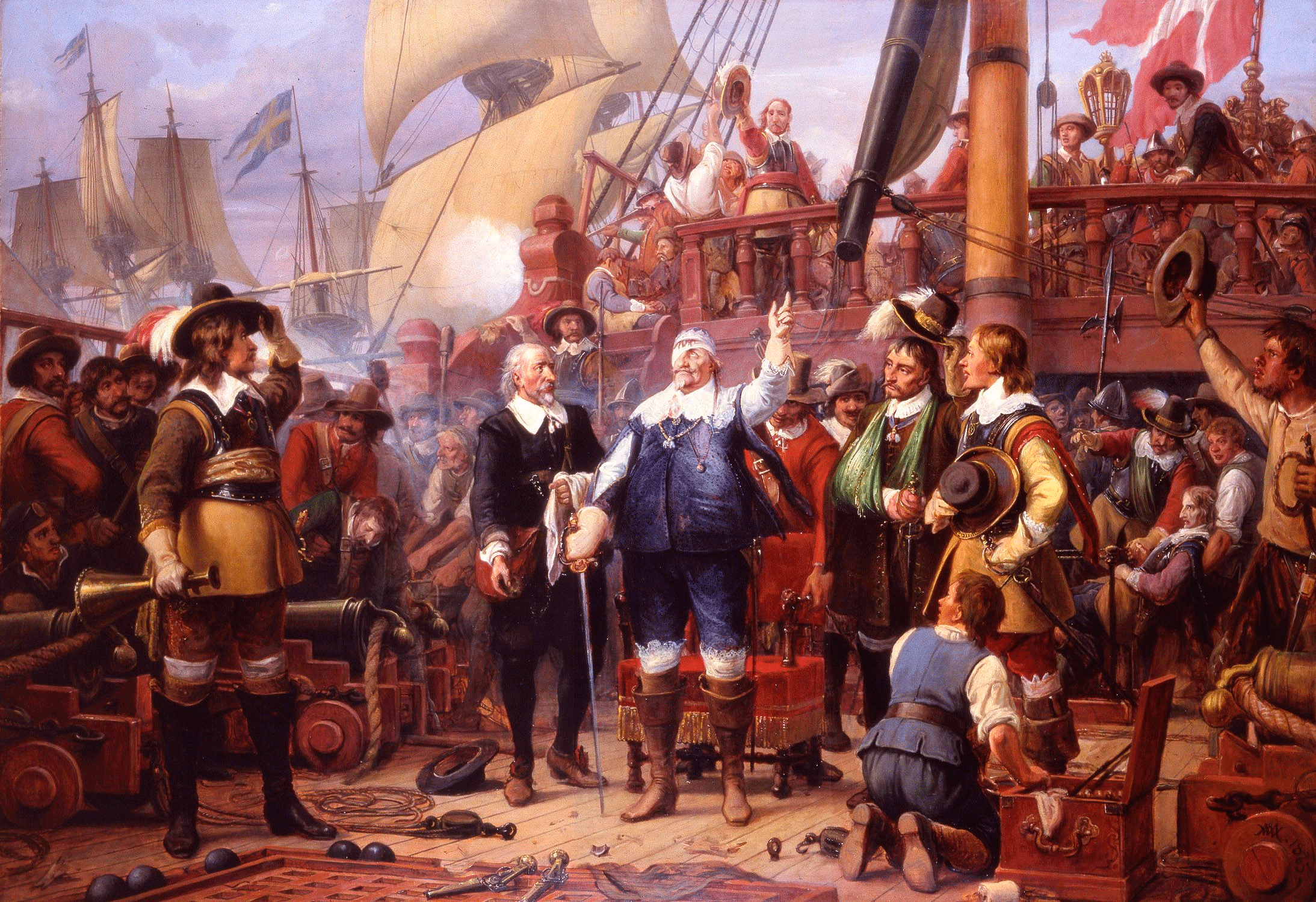
Christian IV at the Battle of Colberger Heide

Sweden was able, thanks to their conquests in the Thirty Years' War, to attack Denmark from the south as well as the east; the Dutch alliance promised to secure them at sea. In May 1643 the Swedish Privy Council decided upon war; on 12 December the Swedish Field Marshal Lennart Torstensson, advancing from Bohemia, crossed the southern frontier of Denmark; and by the end of January 1644 the whole peninsula of Jutland was in Swedish hands. This unexpected attack, conducted from first to last with consummate ability and lightning-like rapidity, had a paralysing effect upon Denmark.

In his sixty-sixth year he once more displayed something of the energy of his triumphant youth. Night and day he laboured to levy armies and equip fleets. Fortunately for him, the Swedish government delayed hostilities in Scania until February 1644, and the Danes were able to make adequate defensive preparations and save the important fortress of Malmö. The Danish fleet prevented Torstensson crossing from Jutland to Funen, and defeated the Dutch auxiliary fleet which came to Torstensson's assistance at the action of 16 May 1644. Another attempt to transport Torstensson and his army to the Danish islands by a large Swedish fleet was frustrated by Christian IV in person on 1 July 1644. On that day the two fleets encountered at the Battle of Colberger Heide. As Christian stood on the quarterdeck of the Trinity, a cannon close by was exploded by a Swedish cannonball, and splinters of wood and metal wounded the king in thirteen places, blinding one eye and flinging him to the deck. But he was instantly on his feet again, cried with a loud voice that it was well with him, and set every one an example of duty by remaining on deck until the fight was over. Darkness at last separated the contending fleets; and the battle was drawn.

The Danish fleet subsequently blockaded the Swedish ships in the Bay of Kiel. But the Swedish fleet escaped, and the annihilation of the Danish fleet by the combined navies of Sweden and the Netherlands, after an obstinate fight between Fehmarn and Lolland at the end of September, exhausted the military resources of Denmark and compelled Christian to accept the mediation of France and the Netherlands; and peace was finally signed with the Treaty of Brömsebro on 8 February 1645. Here Denmark had to cede Gotland, Ösel and (for thirty years) Halland, while Norway lost the two provinces Jämtland and Härjedalen, giving Sweden the supremacy of the Baltic Sea.

=== Norwegian issue ===
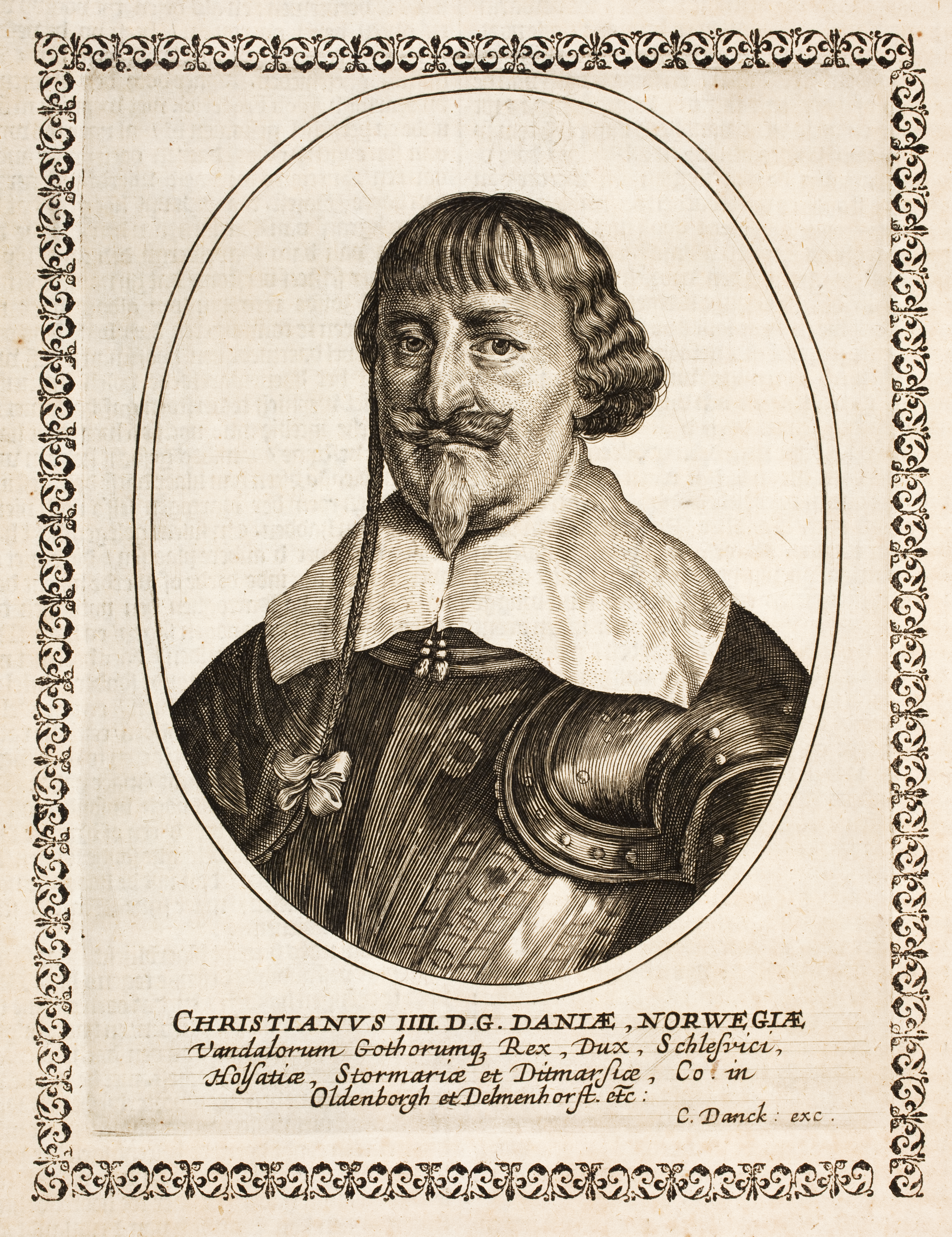
Engraving of Christian IV

Christian IV spent more time in the kingdom of Norway than any other Oldenburg monarch and no Oldenburg king made such a lasting impression on the Norwegian people. He visited the country a number of times and founded four cities. He also established and took control over one silver mine (Kongsberg), one copper mine (Røros in Trøndelag), and tried to make an iron plant with limited success in Eiker. In 1647 he gave the crown privileges of the Røros Copper Works to his banker and his privy councillor (Geheimrat) Joachim Irgens von Westervick, including rights to forests and water resources within a circle of diameter 90 kilometers. Christian also restored and restructured the castle Akershus, where he invited the people of Norway to the official and age-old installment of the king in 1590, and again in 1610.

When the king was busy overseeing the reparations and re-building of the fortress at Oslo, he lived in the country all summer, and at the same time tried to establish a centre for producing iron at Eiker in Buskerud. History tells he actually ruled the entire kingdom from this area in the summer of 1603.

In 1623, Christian again visited Norway for an entire summer, this time to oversee the foundation of Kongsberg. He was also present in the area in 1624, when Oslo burned in August of that year. The king was able to reach the area in a few weeks, being in Eiker. Over the years, fire had destroyed major parts of the city many times, as many of the city's buildings were built entirely of wood. After the fire in 1624 which lasted for three days, Christian IV decided that the old city should not be rebuilt again. He decided that the new town be rebuilt in the area below Akershus Fortress, a castle which later was converted into a palace and royal residence. His men built a network of roads in Akershagen and demanded that all citizens should move their shops and workplaces to the newly built city of Christiania.

=== Securing the Northern Lands under the Danish-Norwegian Crown ===
During the fourteenth century the Swedish kings tried to push the areas of their control towards the north, and contemporary maps depicted the now Norwegian coastal areas of Troms and Finnmark as a part of Sweden. The possibly boldest move of any Danish-Norwegian regent was to make a voyage to the Northern Lands to secure these lands under the Danish-Norwegian crown.

=== Last years and death ===
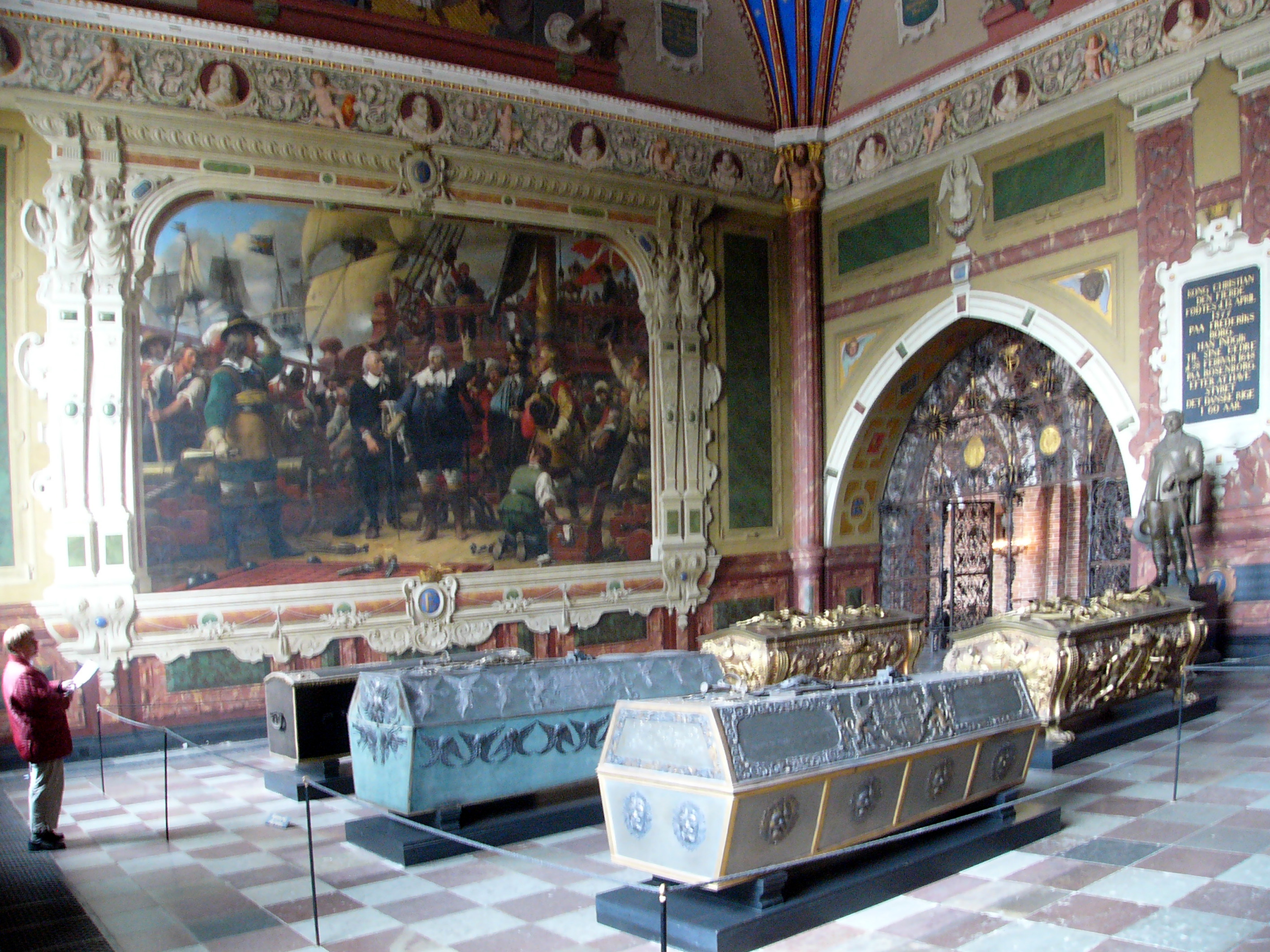
Chapel of Christian IV at Roskilde Cathedral

After the Torstenson War, Rigsrådet took on an increasing role, under the leadership of Corfitz Ulfeldt and Hannibal Sehested. The last years of Christian's life were embittered by sordid differences with his sons-in-law, especially with Corfitz Ulfeldt.

His personal obsession with witchcraft led to the public execution of some of his subjects during the Burning Times. He was responsible for several witch burnings, including 21 people in Iceland, and most notably the conviction and execution of Maren Spliid, who was victim of a witch hunt at Ribe and was burned at the Gallows Hill near Ribe on 9 November 1641.

On 21 February 1648, at his earnest request, he was carried in a litter from Frederiksborg to his beloved Copenhagen, where he died a week later. He was buried in Roskilde Cathedral. The chapel of Christian IV had been completed 6 years before the King died.

== Cultural king ==
Christian was reckoned a typical renaissance king, and excelled in hiring musicians and artists from all over Europe. Many English musicians were employed by him at several times, among them William Brade, John Bull and John Dowland. Dowland accompanied the king on his tours, and as he was employed in 1603, rumour has it he was in Norway as well. Christian was an agile dancer, and his court was reckoned the second most "musical" court in Europe, only ranking behind that of Elizabeth I of England. Christian maintained good contact with his sister Anne, who was married to King James. Christian asked Anne to request for him the services of Thomas Cutting, a lutenist employed by Arbella Stewart. His other sister, Elizabeth, was married to the Duke of Brunswick-Lüneburg, and artists and musicians travelled freely between the courts.

== City foundations ==
Christian IV is renowned for his many city (town) foundations, and is most likely the Nordic head of state that can be accredited for the highest number of new cities in his realm. These towns/cities are:

- Christianopel, now Kristianopel in Sweden. Founded in 1599 in the then Danish territory of Blekinge as a garrison town near the then Danish-Swedish border.
- Christianstad, now Kristianstad in Sweden. Founded in 1614 in the then Danish territory of Skåne.
- Glückstadt, now in Germany, founded in 1617 as a rival to Hamburg in the then Danish territory of Holstein.
- Christianshavn, now part of Copenhagen, Denmark, founded as a fortification/garrison town in 1619. It also houses Freetown Christiania, a planned commune.
- Konningsberg (King's Mountain), now Kongsberg in Norway, founded as an industrial town in 1624 after the discovery of silver ores.
- Christiania, now Oslo in Norway. After a devastating fire in 1624 the king ordered the old city of Oslo to be moved closer to the fortification of Akershus slot and also renamed it Christiania. The city name was altered to Kristiania in 1877 and then back to Oslo in 1924. The original town of Christian is now known as Kvadraturen = The Quarters.
- Christian(s)sand, now Kristiansand in Norway, founded in 1641 to promote trade at the Agdesiden len in Southern Norway.
- Røros, now in Norway, founded as an industrial town after the discovery of copper ores.

A short-lived town was:

- Christianspris, now in Schleswig, Germany, founded as a garrison town near Kiel in the then Danish territory of Holstein.

Furthermore, Christian is known for erecting many important buildings in his realm, including the observatory Rundetårn, the stock exchange Børsen, the Copenhagen fortress Kastellet, Rosenborg Castle, workers' district Nyboder, the Copenhagen naval Holmen Church (Holmens Kirke), Proviantgården, a brewery, the Tøjhus Museum arsenal, and two Trinity Churches in Copenhagen and modern Kristianstad, now known as respectively Trinitatis Church and Holy Trinity Church. Christian converted Frederiksborg Castle to a Renaissance palace and completely rebuilt Kronborg Castle to a fortress. He also founded the Danish East India Company (Asiatisk Kompagni) inspired by the similar Dutch company.

== Legacy ==
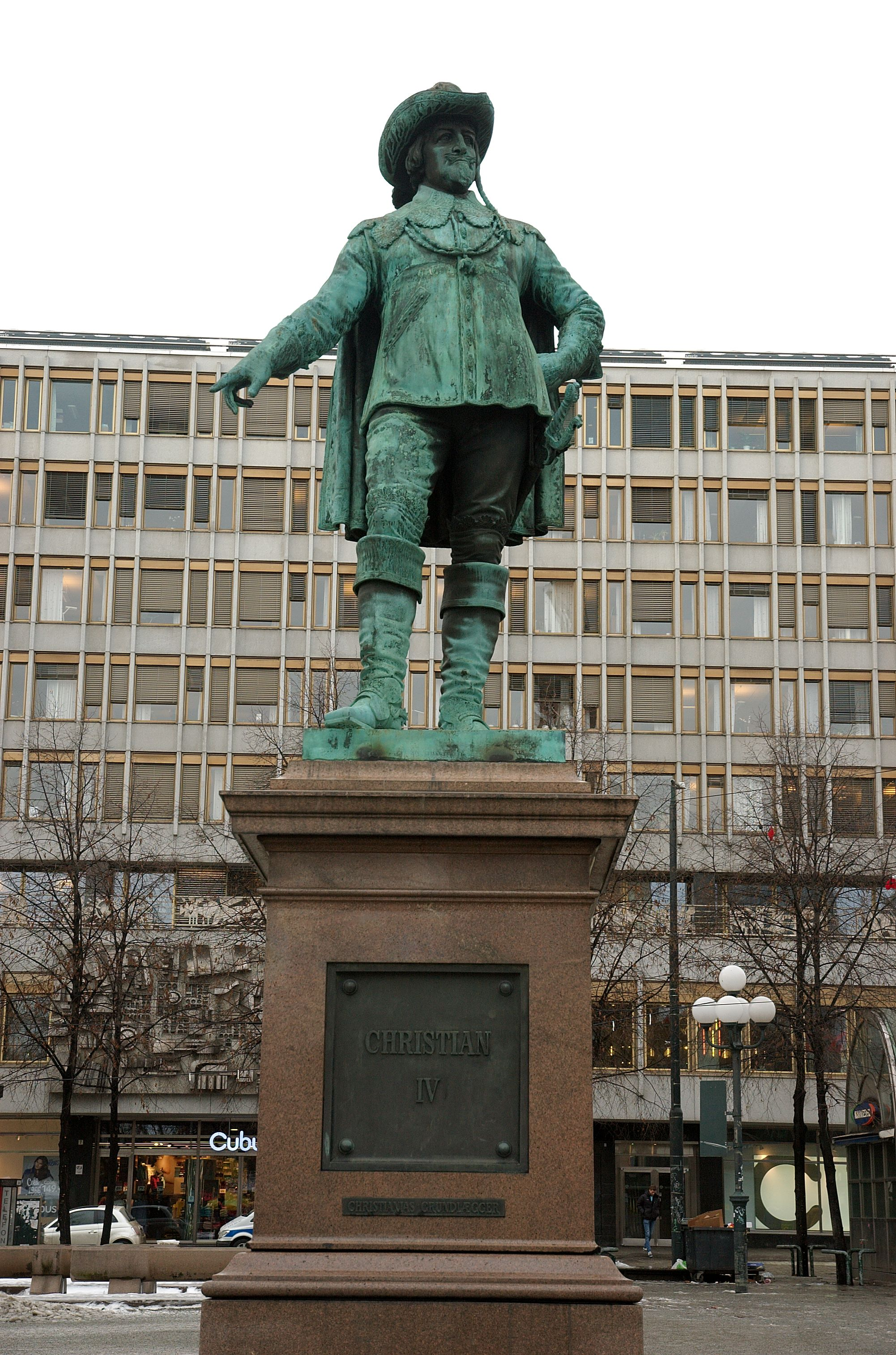
Christian IV monument in Stortorvet, Oslo by Carl Ludvig Jacobsen.

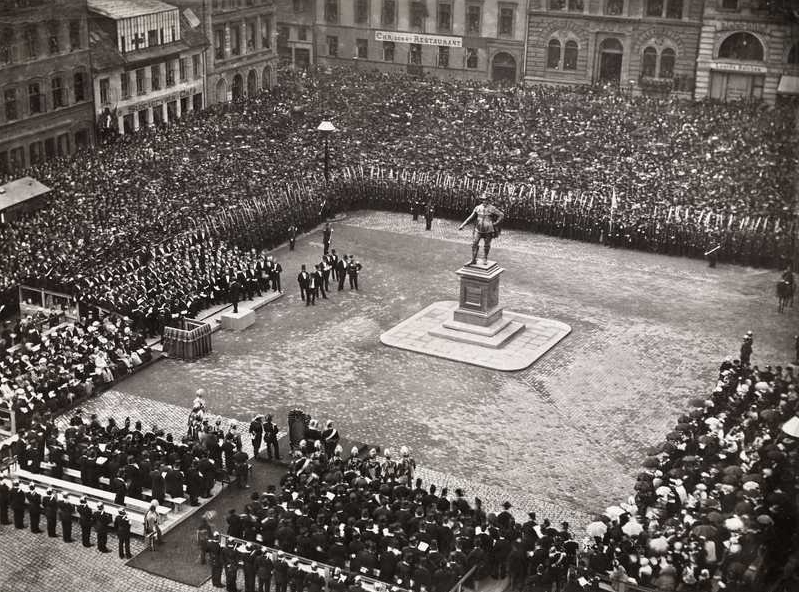
The statue was completed in 1878 and unveiled on 28 September 1880.

Christian is the longest-reigning monarch in Scandinavian history in terms of holding the title. However, the Danish Royal House recognized Margrethe II as having the official record in July 2023. The Danish Royal House noted that Christian IV was not of the legal age to become King upon his father's death, which resulted in a "guardian government" being installed until he was officially installed as King in 1596. When Christian was crowned king, Denmark–Norway held a supremacy over the Baltic Sea, which he lost to Sweden. Nevertheless, Christian was one of the few kings from the House of Oldenburg that achieved a lasting legacy of popularity with both the Danish and Norwegian people. As such, he featured in the Danish national play Elverhøj. Furthermore, his great building activities also furthered his popularity.

Christian IV spoke Danish, German, Latin, French, and Italian. He was described as hospitable and social, though also characterized by irritability. He focused on his personal interests and ambitions. During a 1606 visit to England, his level of alcohol consumption was noted by the English Court. In his later years, he was described as having a lack of self-control and experiencing a decline in health and morale before his death.

The Christian IV Glacier in Greenland is named after him.

=== In fiction ===
- Christian IV is depicted as a brilliant but hard-drinking monarch in the Eric Flint and David Weber alternate-history novels 1634: The Baltic War and 1637: No Peace Beyond the Line.
- Christian IV is featured several times in the book series The Legend of the Ice People.
- Christian IV also features prominently in the novel Music and Silence by Rose Tremain, which is primarily set in and around the Danish court in the years 1629 and 1630.
- Christian IV is depicted as a foul-natured person, but a good king who did a lot to make his realm flourish, by the Danish alternative music band Mew in their song, "King Christian".
- Christian IV (Danish title: Christian IV – Den sidste rejse (2018) is a biographical movie, focusing on His Majesty King Christian IV's stormy relationship to Kirsten Munk, and the crucial last hours on his journey from Frederiksborg Castle to Rosenborg Castle on his deathbed. The turning point is Christian IV's and Kirsten Munk's turbulent marriage with accusations of infidelity and attempted murder.
- Christian IV is depicted in Olga Ravn's The Wax Child as the King involved in the beheading of noblewoman Christenze Kruckow of Funen resulting from the witch trials during his reign.

== Issue and private life ==
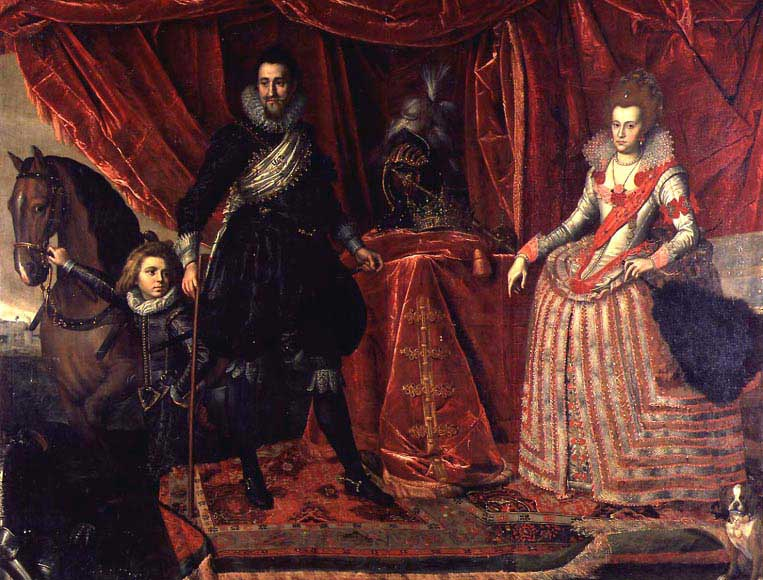
King Christian IV and Queen Anne Catherine with the Prince-Elect. It was originally two separate portraits. The King was painted by Pieter Isaacsz, c. 1612

His first queen was Anne Catherine. They were married from 1597 to 1612. She died after bearing Christian seven children. In 1615, three years after her death, the king privately married Kirsten Munk, by whom he had twelve more children.

In 1632, an English envoy to king Christian IV, then aged 55, primly remarked, "Such is the life of that king: to drink all day and to lie with a whore every night".

In the course of 1628, Christian discovered that his wife, Kirsten Munk, was having a relationship with one of his German officers, so he had Kirsten placed under house arrest. She endeavoured to cover up her own disgrace by conniving at an intrigue between Vibeke Kruse, one of her discharged maids, and the king. In January 1630, the rupture became final, and Kirsten retired to her estates in Jutland. Meanwhile, Christian openly acknowledged Vibeke as his mistress, and they had several children.

With his first wife, Anne Catherine of Brandenburg, he fathered the following children:

- Stillborn son (1598).
- Frederik (15 August 1599 – 9 September 1599), died in infancy.
- Christian (10 April 1603 – 2 June 1647).
- Sophie (4 January 1605 – 7 September 1605), died in infancy.
- Elisabeth (16 March 1606 – 24 October 1608), died in early childhood.
- Frederick III (18 March 1609 – 9 February 1670).
- Ulrik (2 February 1611 – 12 August 1633); murdered, administrator of the Prince-Bishopric of Schwerin as Ulrich III (1624–1633).

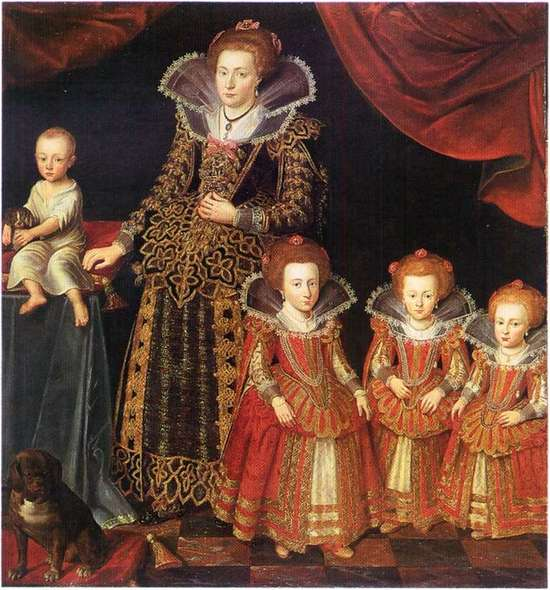
Kirsten Munk and her children as portrayed by Jacob van Doordt, 1623.

With his second wife, Kirsten Munk, he had 12 children, though the youngest, Dorothea Elisabeth, was rumoured to be the daughter of Kirsten's lover, Otto Ludwig:

- Stillborn child (b. & d. 1615).
- Unnamed infant (b. & d. 1617).
- Countess Anna Cathrine of Schleswig-Holstein (10 August 1618 – 20 August 1633); married Frands Rantzau but died in adolescence.
- Countess Sophie Elisabeth of Schleswig-Holstein (20 September 1619 – 29 April 1657); married Christian on Pentz.
- Countess Leonora Christina of Schleswig-Holstein (8 July 1621 – 16 March 1698); married Corfitz Ulfeldt.
- Count Valdemar Christian of Schleswig-Holstein (26 June 1622 – 26 February 1656).
- Countess Elisabeth Auguste of Schleswig-Holstein (28 December 1623 – 9 August 1677); married Hans Lindenov.
- Count Friedrich Christian of Schleswig-Holstein (26 April 1625 – 17 July 1627), died in early childhood.
- Countess Christiane of Schleswig-Holstein (15 July 1626 – 6 May 1670); married Hannibal Sehested.
- Countess Hedwig of Schleswig-Holstein (15 July 1626 – 5 October 1678); married Ebbe Ulfeldt.
- Countess Maria Katharina of Schleswig-Holstein (29 May 1628 – 1 September 1628), died in infancy.
- Countess Dorothea Elisabeth of Schleswig-Holstein (1 September 1629 – 18 March 1687).

With Kirsten Madsdatter:

- Christian Ulrik Gyldenløve (1611–1640).

With Karen Andersdatter:

- Dorothea Elisabeth Gyldenløve (1613–1615), died in early childhood.
- Hans Ulrik Gyldenløve (1615–1645).

With Vibeke Kruse:

- Ulrik Christian Gyldenløve (1630–1658).
- Elisabeth Sophia Gyldenløve (1633–1654); married Major-General Klaus Ahlefeld.

== Gallery ==
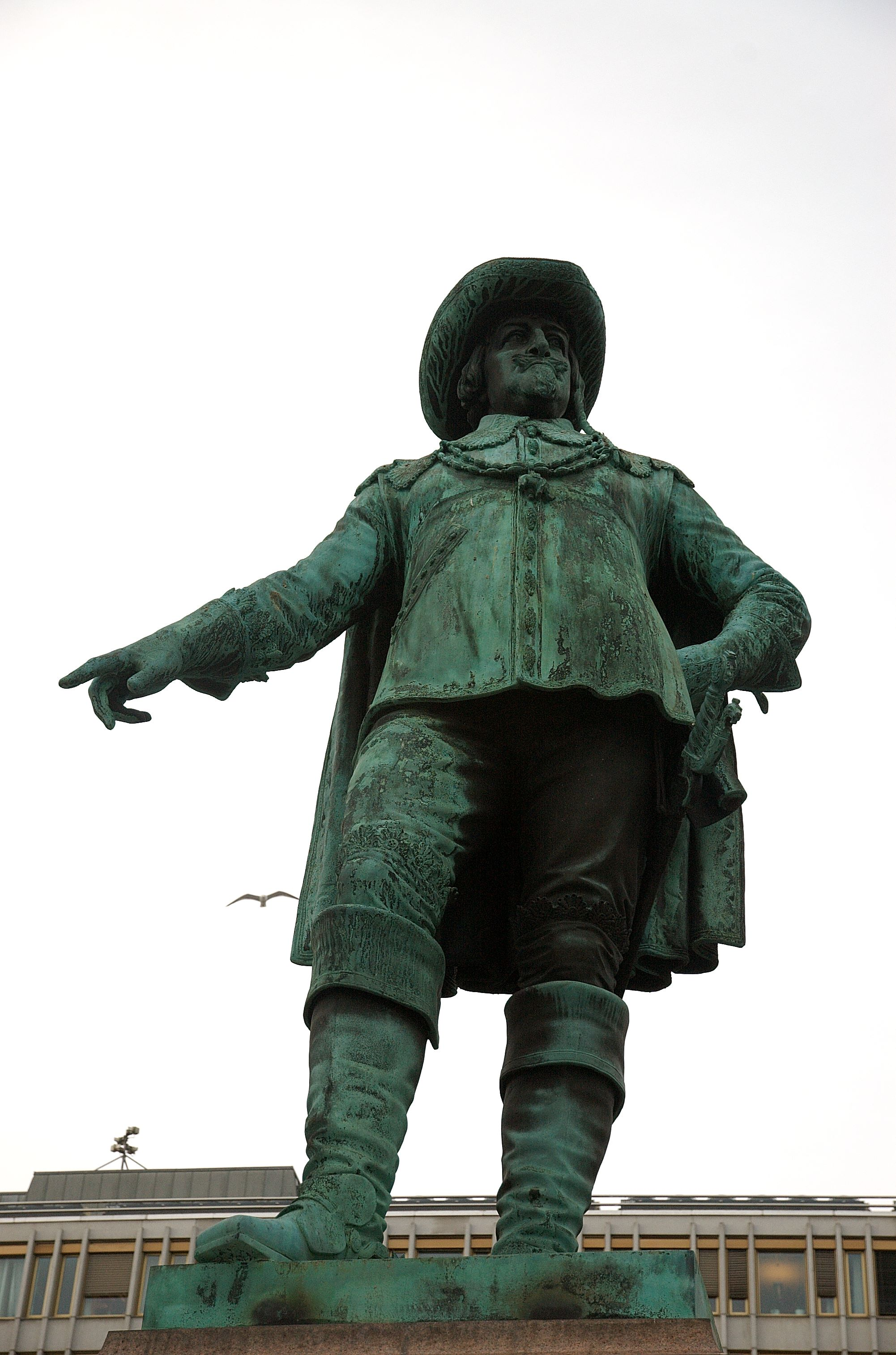
Statue of King Christian IV in Oslo

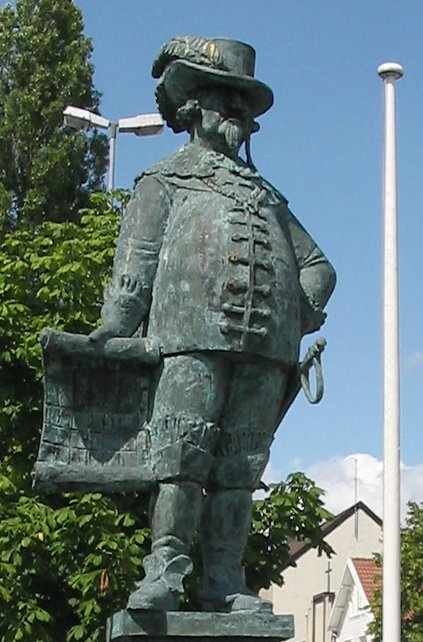
Statue of Christian IV in Kristiansand

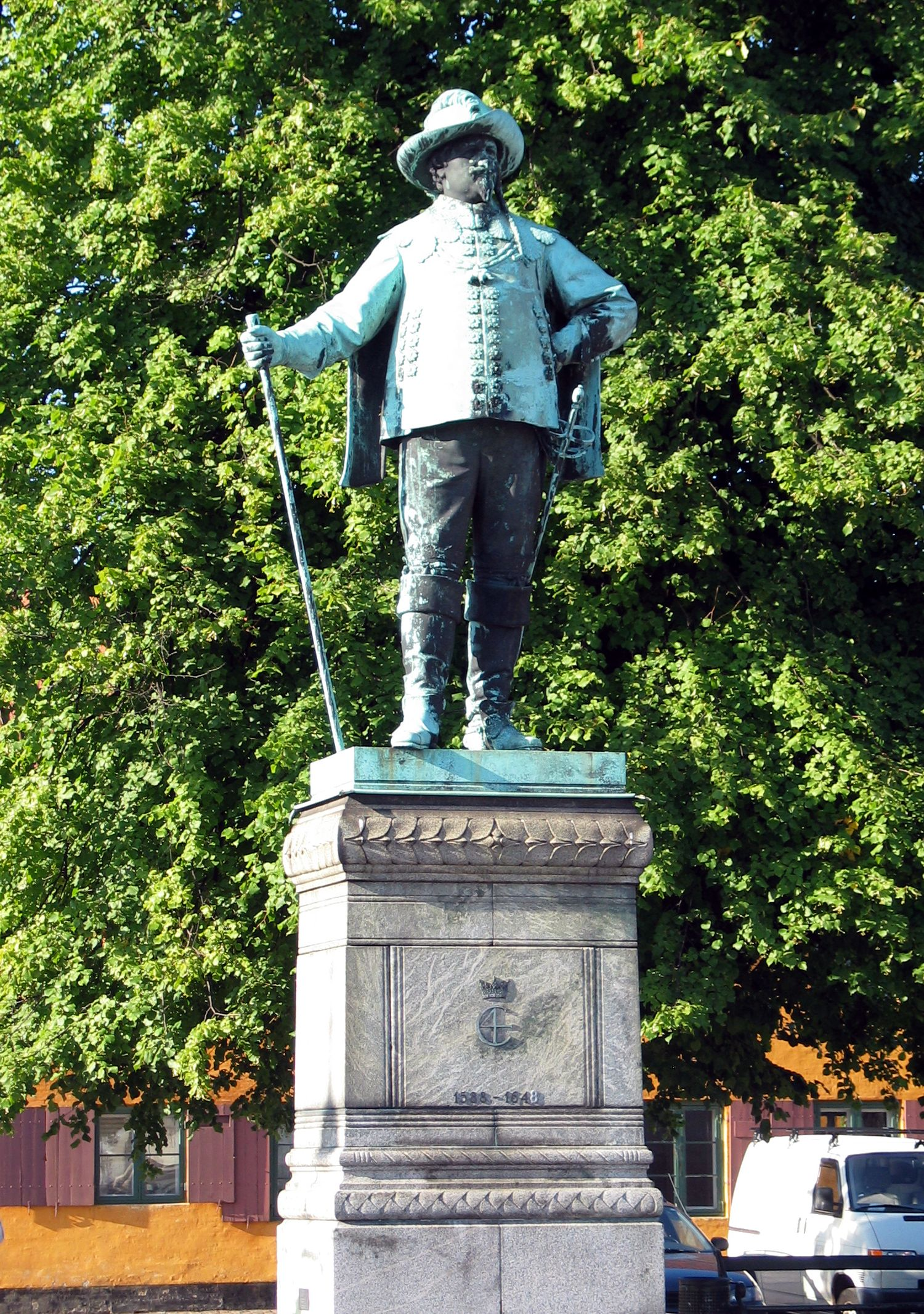
Statue of Christian IV in Copenhagen

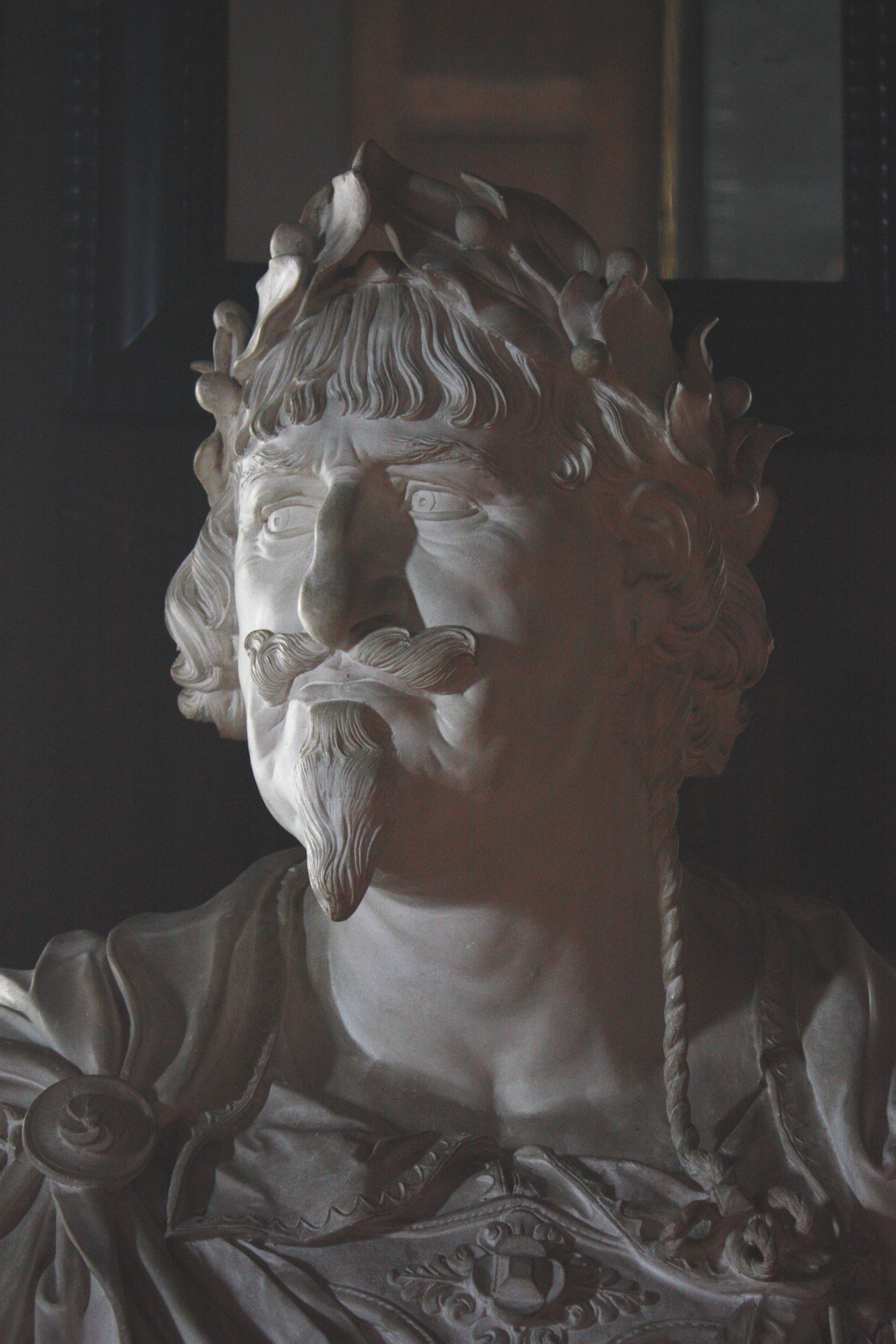
Bust of Christian IV at Frederiksborg Castle

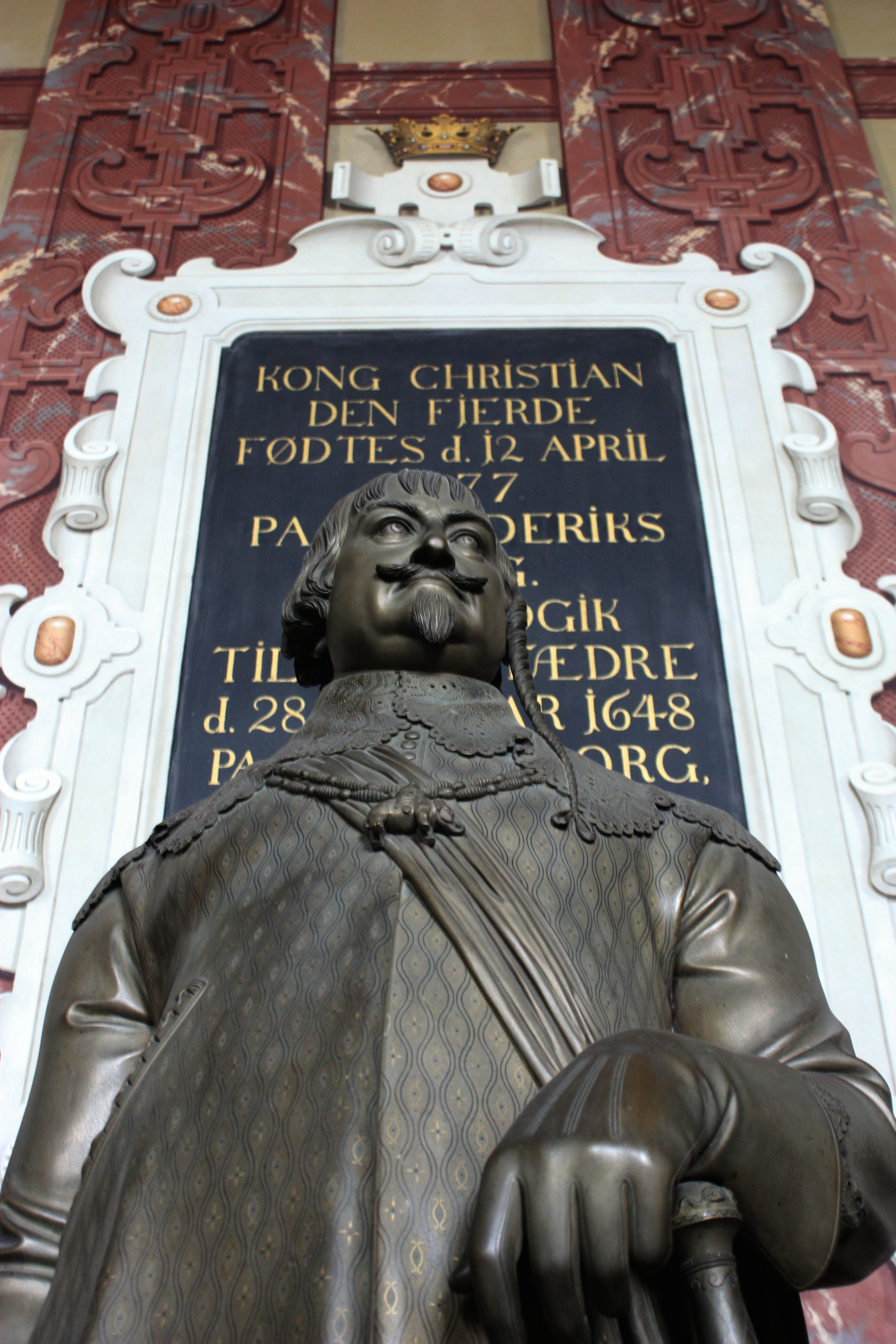
Sculpture by Christian IV in Roskilde Cathedral by Bertel Thorvaldsen

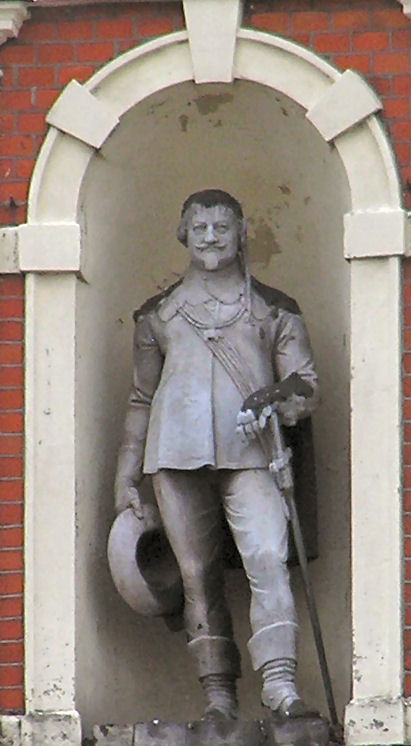
Statue of Christian IV at the city hall in Kristianstad by Bertel Thorvaldsen

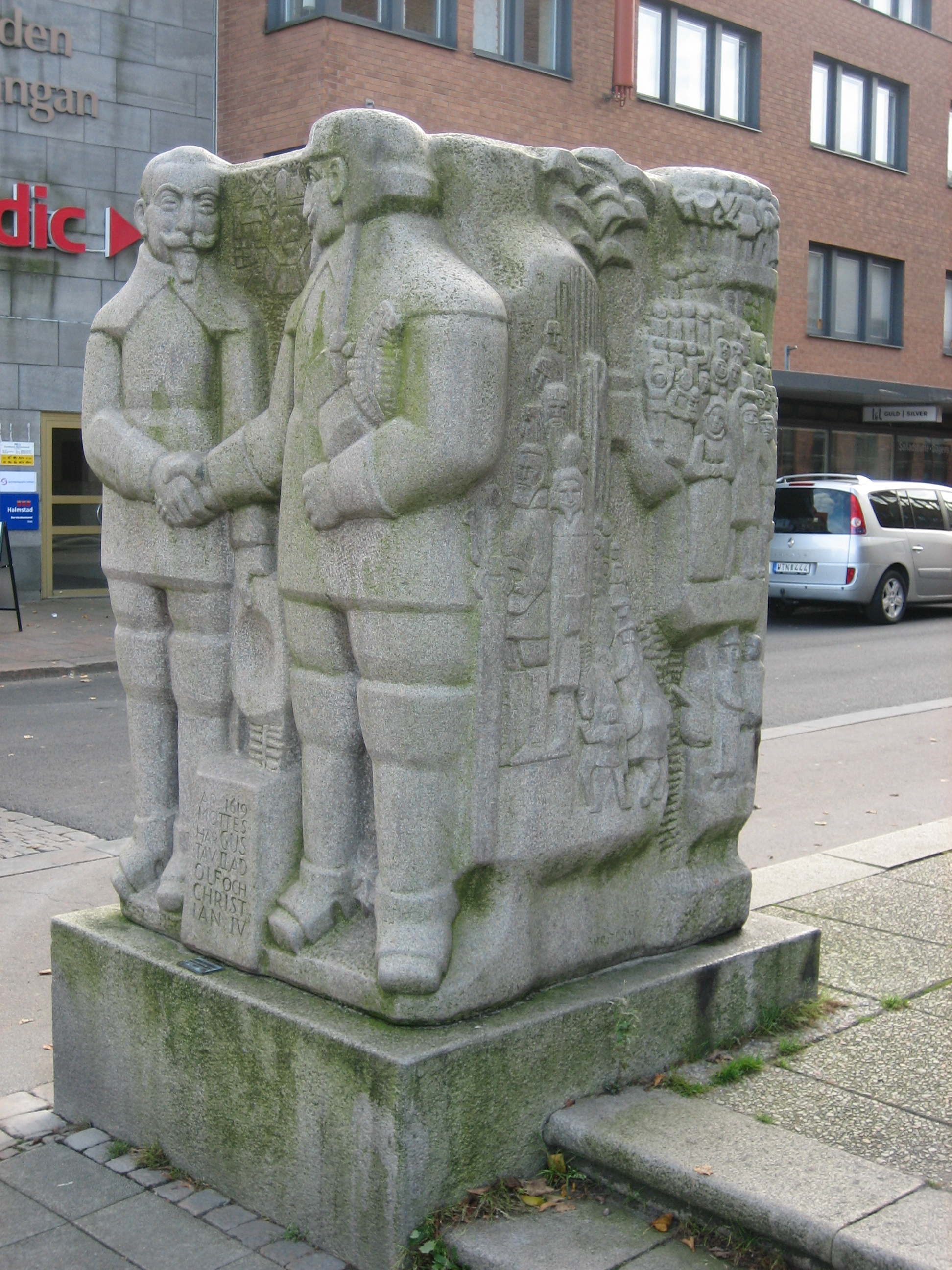
Sculpture of Christian IV meeting the king of Sweden, Gustav II Adolf in Halmstad

== Ancestry ==
Ancestors of Christian IV of Denmark

8. Frederick I of Denmark (=#14)
4. Christian III of Denmark
9. Anna of Brandenburg
2. Frederick II of Denmark
10. Magnus I, Duke of Saxe-Lauenburg
5. Dorothea of Saxe-Lauenburg
11. Catherine of Brunswick
1. Christian IV of Denmark
12. Albrecht VII, Duke of Mecklenburg
6. Ulrich, Duke of Mecklenburg
13. Anna of Brandenburg
3. Sophie of Mecklenburg-Güstrow
14. Frederick I of Denmark (=#8)
7. Elizabeth of Denmark
15. Sophie of Pomerania

== Titles and style ==
In the 1621 Treaty of The Hague and Treaty of Bremen between Denmark–Norway and the Dutch Republic, Christian was styled "Lord Christian the Fourth, King of all Denmark and Norway, the Goths and the Wends, duke of Schleswig, Holstein, Stormarn, and Ditmarsh, count of Oldenburg and Delmenhorst, etc."

Christian IV of Denmark House of Oldenburg Born: 12 April 1577 Died: 28 February 1648
Regnal titles
Preceded by Frederick II	King of Denmark and Norway; 1588–1648	Succeeded by Frederick III
Preceded by Frederick II and Philip	Duke of Holstein and Schleswig; 1588–1648 with Philip (1588–1590); John Adolf (1590–1616); Frederick III (1616–1648)	Succeeded by Frederick III (Denmark) and Frederick III (Gottorp)
Preceded by Otto V	Count of Holstein-Pinneberg; 1640	Holstein-Pinneberg merged into the Duchy of Holstein
