= Ludvig Munk =

Danish official and Count

Ludvig Ludvigsen Munk
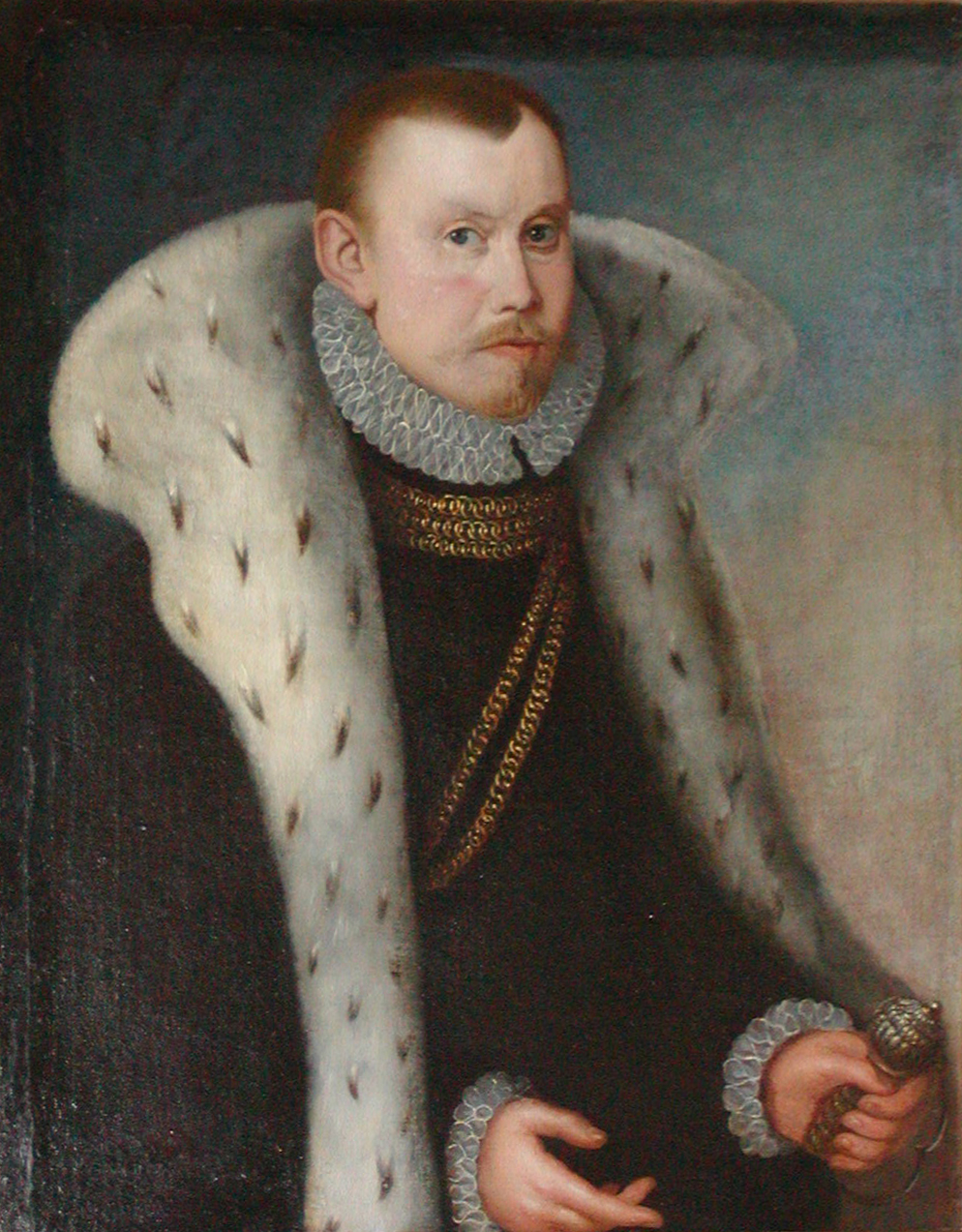
- A 16th-century portrait of Ludvig Monk (oil), in the Portrait Collection at Frederiksborg Palace

Governor-general of Norway
- In office 1577–1583
- Monarch: Frederick II
- Preceded by: Povel Huitfeldt
- Succeeded by: Axel Gyldenstjerne

Personal details
- Born: 1537 (exact date unknown) Vejle, Denmark
- Died: 8 April 1602 Funen, Denmark
- Occupation: Junker
- Known for: Nobleman

Ludvig Ludvigsen Munk (1537 in Vejle – 8 April 1602 at Nørlund castle, Funen) was a Danish official and Count. He was also referred to as Ludvig Ludvigsen Munk von Schleswig-Holstein and Ludvig Munk til Nørlund.

== Career ==
He was a Junker at the royal court in 1561. Subsequently, he served in the Navy and participated in the Northern Seven Years' War (1563–70) both at sea and on land. Along with his stepfather Christoffer Sydney, he was taken prisoner in the Battle of Axtorna (in Halland) on 20 November 1565, but soon regained his liberty. He moved to Trondheim, Norway in 1571, and served there as the Lord of Trøndelag, Jemtland and Herjedalen until 1577. Then he relocated to Akershus Fortress in Oslo and served as Governor-general of Norway from 1577 to 1583. After 1583 he became the District Governor and feudal overlord of: Hedmark (1587), then Lister (1588–89) and Trøndelag (1589–96).

His service as a feudal overlord was noted for controversy. While he served as Lord of Trøndelag in 1573, he and his officials exceeded their rights and collected taxes or appropriated lands beyond that allowed by law. The residents sent a committee led by Rolv Halvardsson to Copenhagen to appeal Munk's judgments to King Frederick II, as was their ancient right. Although Munk's judgments were overturned, Munk ignored the king's written direction to redress the grievances and instead imprisoned and hanged all members of the committee. During King Christian's tour of Norway in 1596, this and other abuses were reported to the king, who dismissed Munk from office, banished him to his estates in Jutland and forced him to pay a heavy fine. Lockhart indicates Ludvig Munk's Jutland estates were forfeited to the king posthumously.

== Personal life ==
At the approximate age of 52, he married the 17-year-old Ellen Marsvin (1572–1649) of Lundegaard and Ellensborg on 29 June 1589. He and Ellen had a daughter, Kirsten Munk. in 1615 Kirsten entered into a morganatic marriage with the widowed King Christian IV of Denmark. She had twelve children with Christian IV, among them the famous Countess Leonora Christina Ulfeldt.
