= Karen Sehested =

Danish court official and landowner

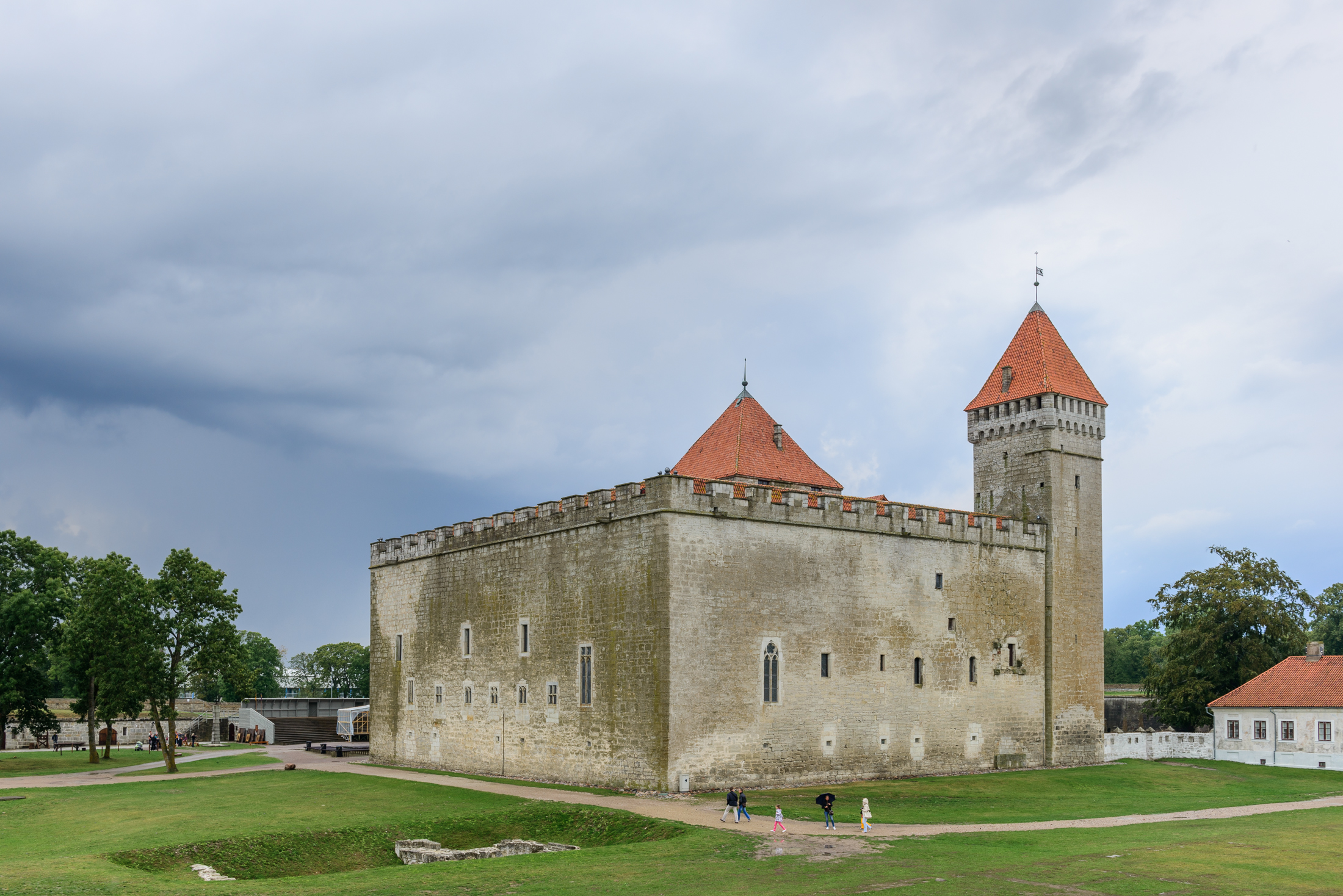
Arensborg Castle on Øsel

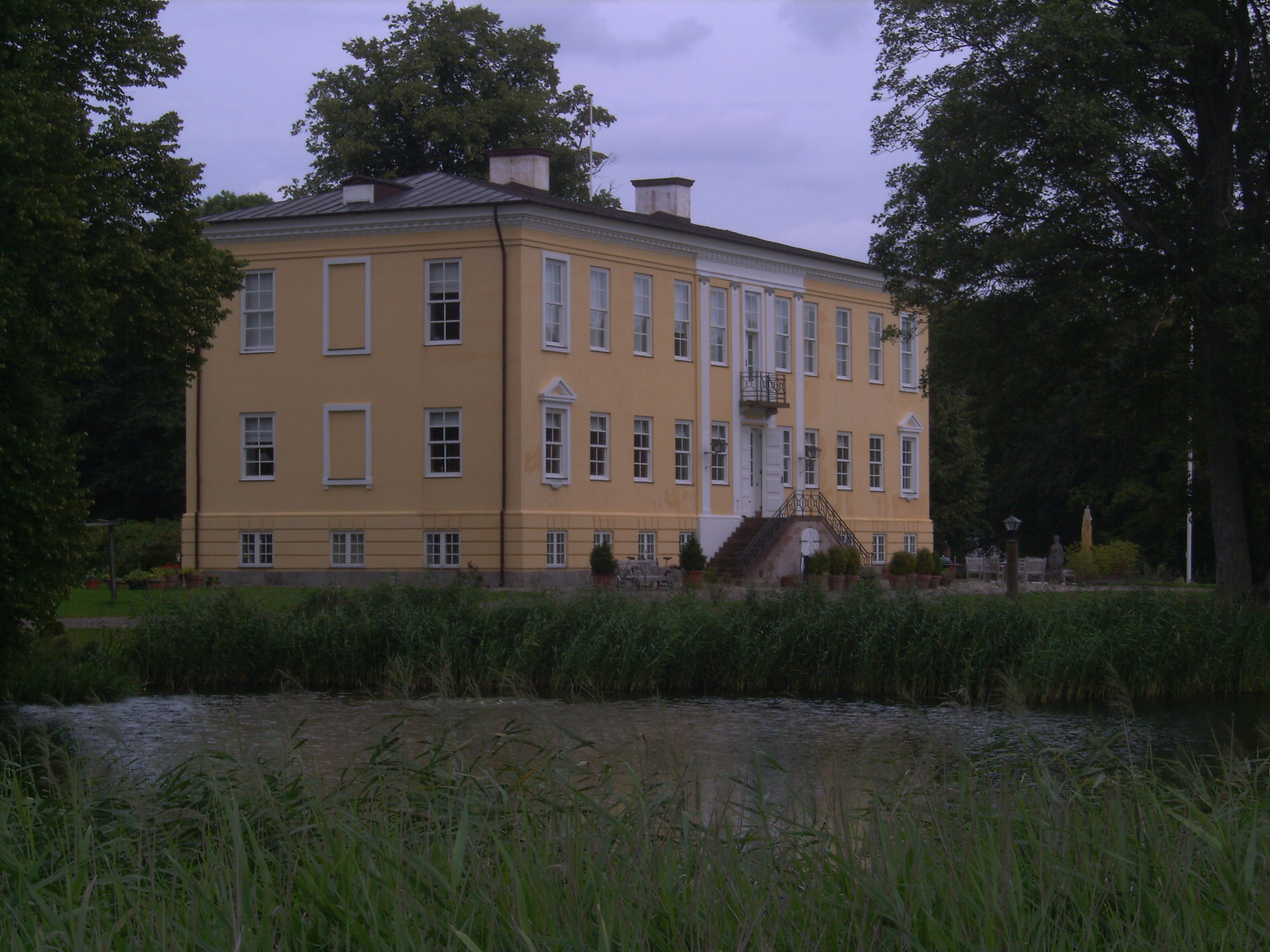
Stenalt at Ørsted in Randers

Karen Sehested (1606–1672) was a Danish court official and landowner. She served as principal lady-in-waiting and royal governess for the children of King Christian IV of Denmark and Kirsten Munk from 1631 to 1634. She was portrayed in the famous memoirs of Leonora Christina Ulfeldt, Jammers Minde (1674).

== Biography ==
Karen Sehested was born at Arensborg Castle on Øsel. At that time, this portion of Estonia was under the rule of Magnus, Duke of Holstein (1540–1583), younger son of King Christian III of Denmark. She was the daughter of nobleman Claus Maltesen Sehested (1558–1612) and Anne Nielsdatter Lykke (1568–1645). She was sister of Hannibal Sehested (1609–1666) as well as Sophie Sehested (b. 1594) and Malte Sehested (b. 1596). She married Tyge Kruse of Stenalt (1604-1629) in 1628 and Jørgen Seefeld of Visborg (1606-1666) in 1641.

In 1631 she was made governess of the king's morganatic children. The task was difficult because of the stormy morganatic marriage. She was fired by the king since his children had complained about her extreme severity and physical discipline. Her later relationship one of her former wards, King Frederick III of Denmark, was however a good one. She resided at the Stenalt estate in the parish of Ørsted in Randers. From 1635 to 1642, she became the foster mother of her nephew, admiral and naval hero, Niels Juel (1629-1697).
