= Ellen Marsvin =

Danish noble, landowner and county administrator

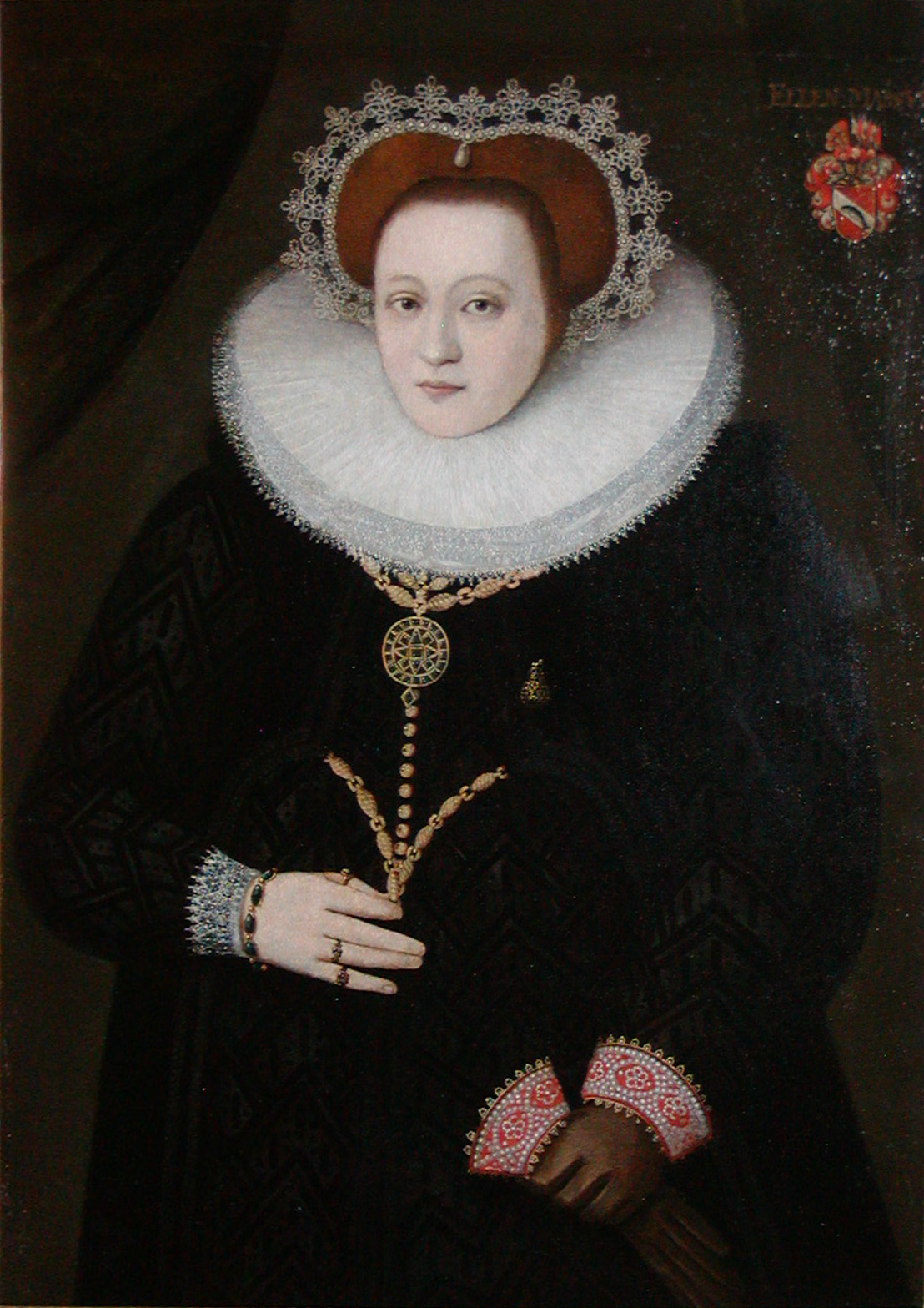
- Born: 1 February 1572; Landskrona Citadel, Scania, Denmark-Norway
- Died: 11 November 1649 (aged 77)
- Spouse(s): Ludvig Munk; Knud Rud
- Children: Kirsten Munk

Ellen Marsvin (1 February 1572 – 11 November 1649) was a Danish noble, landowner and county administrator. She was the mother-in-law of King Christian IV of Denmark-Norway, the mother of Kirsten Munk (1598–1658) and grandmother of Leonora Christina Ulfeldt (1621–1698).

== Biography ==
She was born at Landskrona Citadel in Scania (Skåne), a part of Denmark that was conquered by Sweden in 1658 and has been Swedish since. She was the daughter of the noble, council and governor Jørgen Marsvin (ca. 1527–81) and Karen Gyldenstierne (ca. 1542–89). She was married to Count Ludvig Munk (1537–1602) in 1589. Widowed in 1602, she married the governor and noble Knud Rud (1556–1611) in 1607. She was widowed for a second time in 1611.

In 1615 her only child, Kirsten, married King Christian IV of Denmark-Norway. Ellen had demanded that her daughter be married rather than be mistress to the king; she also formed the marriage contract, in which it was stated that Kirsten should be the legal spouse of the king and receive a county as widow pension. Ellen was made the guardian of her daughter's children with the king, the trustée for her grandchildren's' allowances, and was made responsible for their fortune. From 1620 until 1639, she was administrator of Dalum Kloster manor on the island of Funen. Marsvin was one of the most successful landowners in Denmark. Through her inheritance, money and connections, she bought, sold and built large estates with great success. In 1625 she was one of the richest landowners in Denmark.

In 1629 when her daughter was accused of adultery, she introduced the king to his next lover Vibeke Kruse; to justify Kirsten's adultery, or to keep her personal influence over the monarch. The king respected her for her skill as a businessperson. In 1639, however, the king grew tired of her persistent demand that he recognize his wife's youngest daughter Dorothea Elisabeth, (her own youngest grandchild) as his, and as a result, he fired her as county administrator. In the middle of the 1640s, she retired to her manorial estate Ellensborg, the present Holckenhavn on Funen and lived the rest of her life at her estate.
