= Dina Vinhofvers =

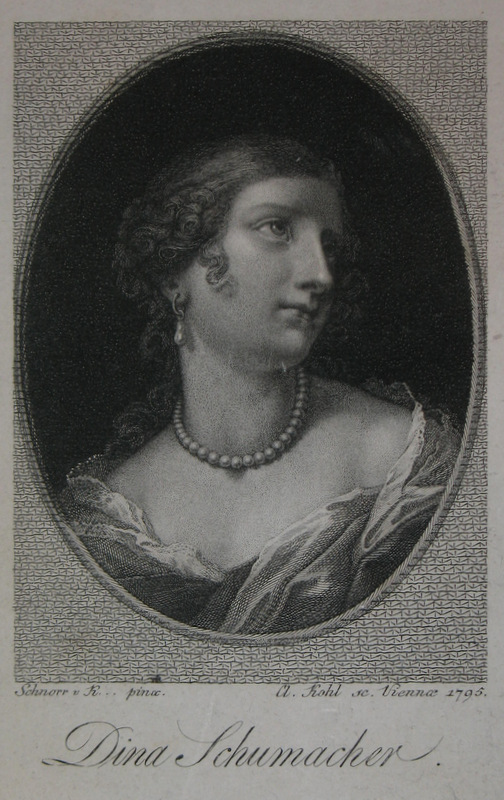
Fantasy illustration of Dina Vinhofvers from 1795

Dina Vinhofvers (1620 – 7 July 1651) was a Danish silk worker who became famous because of her involvement in an alleged conspiracy of Danish statesman Corfitz Ulfeldt (1606–1664) against King Frederick III of Denmark in 1650–51.

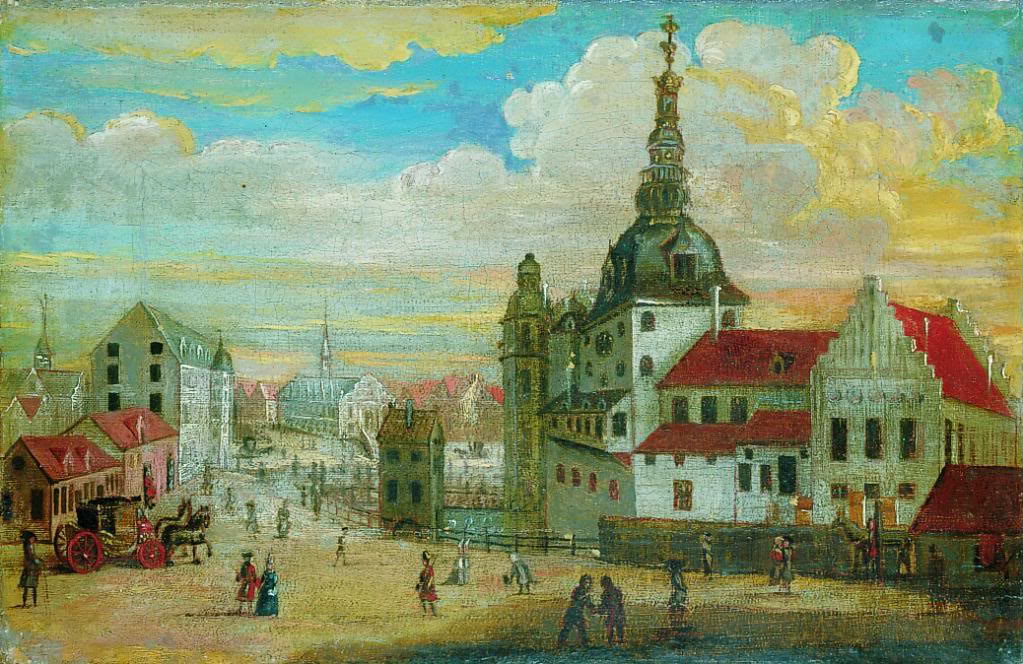
Copenhagen Castle

== Background ==
She was born in Copenhagen to German parents. Her mother, Margrethe Vinhofvers, is known to have had a position at the work house's staff. She married David Schumacher (d. 1650) in Holstein, had a daughter in 1640 and returned to Denmark in the late 1640s with her lover Lieutenant Jørgen Walter (d. 1670). She, her mother and daughter lived with the silk manufacturer Samson Gertzen and supported herself by silk ironing, but was also pointed out as a prostitute.

== Corfitz affair ==
In 1650, she reported a plan to assassinate the king. She pointed out Corfitz Ulfeldt as the father of the child she expected. She also claimed to have overheard a conversation between Ulfeldt and his wife Leonora Christina Ulfeldt (1621–1698) in which them reportedly spoke of their plans to poison King Frederick III (1609–1670). Leonora Christina Ulfeldt was an illegitimate daughter of King Christian IV of Denmark (1577–1648), and half-sister of Frederick III.

Jørgen Walter, the probable father of her child, who had become a favorite of the king and became ennobled in 1649, presented her accusations before the monarch. Walter is also believed to have been the one who instigated her to put forward her accusation to limit the influence of Ulfeldt, whose position was already risky because of his tense relationship with the king: Walter was close to the Danish-Holstein nobleman Christian Rantzau (1614–1663), who was an opponent of Ulfeldt. The accusation was put forward at a point when Ulfeldt's professional conduct was already under investigation. However, the accusations were kept secret by the king, who wished to examine them quietly.

In 1651, Walter was appointed councillor, which can be seen as a sign that the king had taken the accusations seriously. Vinhofvers now met Leonora Christina and Ulfeldt's priest and confessor Simon Hennings (d. 1661) and told them that Walter had plans to assassinate the Ulfeldt couple. Ulfeldt informed the king, who had Vinhofvers imprisoned at Copenhagen Castle and made the affair public. She retracted her former accusation against Ulfeldt during questioning, and claimed that the accusations had been fabricated by Walter. Ulfeldt was freed by the court and secretly left Denmark (14 July 1651) with his family. But Dina Vinhofvers was sentenced to death for her first accusation. She was decapitated in the summer of 1651 outside Copenhagen Castle.

== In literature ==
The entire affair is the subject of Maria Edgeworth's story "The Conspiracy," first published in her Tales of Real Life (1810). Dina Vinhofvers was the subject of Dina, a tragic play written in 1842 by Adam Oehlenschläger (1779–1850). Danish author Ebbe Kløvedal Reich (1940-2005) also included portions of her story in his publication Rejsen til Messias (Copenhagen: Gyldendal. 1974).

== Related reading ==
- Leonora Christina Ulfeldt, translated by F. E. Bunnètt (1872) Memoirs of Leonora Christina: Daughter of Christian IV. of Denmark; Written During Her Imprisonment in the Blue Tower at Copenhagen 1663-1685 (London:Henry S. King & Co.)
