= List of field marshals of the Holy Roman Empire =

This is a list of those who were granted the rank of Feldmarschall by the Holy Roman Emperor of the Holy Roman Empire of the German Nation, 1512–1806.

== 16th century ==
- 1542 – Johann Hilchen von Lorch (1484–1548)
- 1557 – Adam von Trott († 1564)

== 17th century ==
- 1610 – Michael Adolph von Althann (1574–1638)
- 1618 – Johann Tserclaes, Count of Tilly (1559–1632)
- 1618 – Charles Bonaventure de Longueval, Count of Bucquoy (1571–1621)
- 1621 – Tommaso Caracciolo (1572–1631)
- 1625 – Ramboldo, Count of Collalto (1575–1630)
- 1625 – Albrecht von Wallenstein (1583–1634) – general Wallenstein
- 1626 – Baltasar von Marradas (1560–1638)
- 1627 – Hans Georg von Arnim-Boitzenburg (1583–1641)
- 1627 – Heinrich, Graf Schlick (Schlik zu Bassano und Weißkirchen) († 1650)
- 1629 – Johann Jakob, Count of Bronckhorst and Anholt († 1630)
- 1629 – Torquato Conti Marchese di Guadagnolo († 1636)
- 1629 – John VIII, Count of Nassau-Siegen (1583–1638)
- 1631 – Gottfried Graf von Pappenheim (1594–1632)
- 1631 – Rudolf von Tiefenbach (Teuffenbach zu Mayerhofen) (1582–1653)
- 1632 – Wolfgang von Mansfeld (1575–1638)
- 1632 – Johann von Aldringen (1588–1634)
- 1632 – Matthias Gallas (1584–1647)
- 1632 – Heinrich von Holk (1599–1633)
- 1632 – Hannibal von Schauenburg (Schaumberg) (1582–1634)
- 1633 – Christian von Ilow (1585–1634) (or Illo)
- 1633 – Philipp Graf von Mansfeld (1657)
- 1634 – Archduke Ferdinand of Austria (1608–1657) – Supreme Commander after the death of Wallenstein; 1637 Holy Roman Emperor
- 1634 – Rudolf Hieronymus Eusebius von Colloredo-Waldsee († 1657)
- 1634 – Ottavio Piccolomini (1599–1656)
- 1634 – Melchior, Graf Hatzfeld von Gleichen (1593–1658)
- 1636 – Charles, Duke of Lorraine-Elboeuf († 1656)
- 1637 – Matthias, Prinz von Toscana († 1667)
- 1638 – Friedrich, Duke von Savelli († 1649)
- 1639 – Archduke Leopold Wilhelm of Austria (1614–1662)
- 1639 – Francesco Marchese Carretto de Grana († 1652)
- 1639 – Gottfried, Count Huyn, Freiherr von Geleen Amstenraedt und Wachtendonck († 1657)
- 1641 – Francis Albert of Saxe-Lauenburg († 1642)
- 1642 – Peter, Graf Holzapfel (Melander) (1589–1648)
- 1644 – Johann von Götzen (1599–1645)
- 1645 – Guillaume de Lamboy (1590–1659)
- 1647 – Wenzel, Fürst Lobkowitz, Herzog von Sagan († 1677)
- 1648 – Jakob, Marchese Monterosa († 1648)
- 1648 – Hans Christoph von Puchheim († 1657)
- 1648 – Johann, Baron von Reuschenberg († 1657)
- 1649 – Alessandro Marchese del Borro († 1656)
- 1650 – Walter, Count Leslie (1607–1667)
- 1653 – Alexander Graf von Velen (1599–1675)
- 1655 – Adam, Count Forgach de Ghymes († 1681)
- 1658 – Raimondo Montecuccoli 1609–1680
- 1658 – Adrian von Enkevort (1603–1663)
- 1658 – Don Hannibal, Prince Gonzaga (1602–1668) – City commander of Vienna
- 1664 – Leopold Wilhelm of Baden-Baden (1626–1671)
- 1664 – Philipp Florinus, Pfalzgraf bei Rhein (1630–1703)
- 1664 – Jean-Louis Raduit de Souches († 1683)
- 1664 – Otto Christoph von Sparr († 1668)
- 1667 – Paul I, Prince Esterházy (1635–1713)
- 1672 – Alexander von Bournonville († 1690), entered in Spanish service in 1676
- 1675 – Charles V, Duke of Lorraine (1634–1690), lifted the Siege of Vienna in 1683
- 1676 – Johann Adolf, Duke zu Holstein († 1704)
- 1676 – Friedrich, Markgraf von Baden-Durlach (1617–1677)
- 1682 – Ernst Rüdiger von Starhemberg (1638–1701), defender of Vienna 1683
- 1682 – Prince Georg Friedrich of Waldeck (1620–1692)
- 1683 – Hermann, Markgraf von Baden-Baden († 1691)
- 1683 – Kaspar Zdeněk Kaplíř von Sulevic (1611–1686), logistic organizer of Vienna's defense 1683
- 1683 – Count Aeneas Sylvius de Caprara (1631–1701)
- 1683 – Othon Henri del Caretto, Marquis of Savona (1629–1685)
- 1683 – Jakob, Graf Leslie († 1692)
- 1683 – Julius Franz Herzog zu Sachsen-Lauenburg (1641–1689)
- 1686 – Louis William, Margrave of Baden-Baden (1655–1707) – der Türkenlouis
- 1687 – Rudolf Graf Rabatta zu Dornberg († 1686)
- 1687 – Carl Theodor Otto Fürst Salm, Wildgraf zu Daun und Kyburg, Rheingraf zum Stein († 1710)
- 1688 – Johann Heinrich von Dünewald (1617–1691)
- 1688 – Antonio Graf Caraffa († 1693)
- 1688 – Charles Eugène de Croÿ (1651–1702)
- 1689 – Heinrich Franz von Mansfeld, Fürst zu Fondi (1641–1715)
- 1689 – Johann Carl Graf Serény († 1690)
- 1689 – Maximilian Lorenz von Starhemberg († 1689)
- 1689 – Christian Louis, Count of Waldeck († 1706)
- 1690 – Walrad, Prince of Nassau-Usingen († 1702)
- 1691 – Christian Ernst, Margrave of Brandenburg-Bayreuth (1644–1712)
- 1693 – Prince Eugene of Savoy (1663–1736), Prinz Eugen
- 1694 – Johann Wilhelm Anton Reichsgraf von und zu Daun (1706)
- 1694 – Johann Carl Graf Pálffy († 1694)
- 1694 – Ferdinand Freiherr von Stadl († 1696)
- 1694 – Francis Viscount Taafe Earl of Carlingford († 1704)
- 1694 – Friedrich Ambros Graf Veterani (1650–1695)
- 1694 – Frederick Charles, Duke of Württemberg-Winnental (1652–1698)
- 1696 – Charles III Philip, Elector Palatine (1661–1742)
- 1696 – Hermann Otto II of Limburg Stirum (1646–1704)
- 1696 – Leopold Philipp Reichsfürst von Montecuccoli (1663–1698)
- 1696 – Donat John, Count Heissler of Heitersheim (1648–1696)
- 1696 – Charles of Lorraine, Prince of Commercy (1661–1702)
- 1696 – Carlo di San Martino, Marchese di Parella († 1710)
- 1696 – Friedrich von Schleswig-Holstein-Wiesenburg (1651–1724)
- 1696 – Hans Carl Freiherr von Thüngen (1648–1709)
- 1697 – Franz Sigismund von Thun und Hohenstein (1639–1702)
- 1699 – George of Hesse-Darmstadt (1669–1705)

== 18th century ==
- 1701 – Ferdinand Marchese Degli Obizzi († 1710)
- 1701 – Don Cesare Angelo Marchese Del Vasto und Pescara, Fürst von Francavilla († 1701)
- 1704 – Ludwig Johann Graf Bussy-Rabutin (de) (1642–1717)
- 1704 – Sigbert von Heister (1646–1718)
- 1704 – Guidobald Graf von Starhemberg (1657–1737)
- 1704 – Charles Thomas de Lorraine-Vaudemont (1670–1704)
- 1704 – John Ernst of Nassau-Weilburg (1664–1719)
- 1704 – Johann Franz Graf Gronsfeld zu Bronkhorst und Eberstein († 1719)
- 1704 – Ludwig Graf Herbeville (de) († 1709)
- 1704 – Henri de Massue, Marquis de Ruvigny, Earl of Galway (1648–1720) – a Frenchman in British service, allied commander in Spain
- 1704 – Siegmund Joachim Graf von Trauttmannsdorff-Weinsberg (de) (1636–1706)
- 1705 – Don Juan Tomaso Enriquez Cabrera Duke of Riosecco (1652–1705), Supporter of the Habsburgs in the War of Spanish Succession
- 1705 – Friedrich Magnus Graf von Castell-Remlingen († 1717)
- 1706 – Jacques-Louis Comte de Noyelles († 1708), a Walloon who fought for the Dutch Republic in the Iberian theatre of war
- 1707 – Leo Graf Uhlefeld (or Ulfeldt) (1651–1716)
- 1707 – Leopold Graf Schlik zu Bassano und Weisskirchen (1663–1723)
- 1707 – Maximilian Wilhelm of Brunswick-Lüneburg (1666–1726), son of Duke Ernst August
- 1707 – Frederick William, Prince of Hohenzollern-Hechingen (1663–1735)
- 1707 – Maximilian Ludwig Graf Breuner († 1716)
- 1707 – Leopold Graf von Herberstein († 1728), Adjutant to Prince Eugene
- 1707 – Eberhard Ludwig, Duke of Württemberg (1676–1733) – fought in the Battle of Blenheim
- 1707 – Leopold Wirich Graf von Daun (1669–1741)
- 1708 – Johann Martin Freiherr Gschwindt von Pöckstein († 1721)
- 1708 – Johann Josef Graf Huyn († 1719)
- 1708 – Philip of Hesse-Darmstadt (1736)
- 1709 – Johann Graf Pálffy ab Erdöd (1664–1751), Maria Theresia's Vater Pálffy
- 1713 – George William, Margrave of Brandenburg-Bayreuth (1678–1726)
- 1713 – Albrecht Ernst Fürst von Öttingen (1669–1731)
- 1715 – Francisco Colmenero Conde de Vaderios († 1715)
- 1715 – Charles III William, Margrave of Baden-Durlach (1679–1738)
- 1716 – Tobias Freiherr von Hasslingen († 1716)
- 1716 – Scipione Bagni (it) († 1721)
- 1716 – Annibale Visconti (it) († 1747)
- 1717 – Jean-Philippe-Eugène de Mérode-Westerloo (1674–1732)
- 1717 – Eberhard von Neipperg († 1717)
- 1717 – Franz Sebastian Graf Thürheim († 1726)
- 1717 – Karl Alexander, Duke of Württemberg (1684–1737)
- 1717 – Alexander Otto Graf Velen († 1727)
- 1717 – Stephan Graf Stainville († 1720)
- 1717 – Carl Ernst von Rappach († 1719)
- 1717 – Don Luis de Borza Marques de Tarrazena († 1717)
- 1718 – Nikolaus VI Graf Pálffy ab Erdöd (1667–1732)
- 1720 – Don Fernando Pignatelli VI consort-Duke of Híjar († 1729)
- 1723 – Ferdinand Albert II, Duke of Brunswick-Lüneburg (1680–1735)
- 1723 – Johann Heinrich Bürkli (1647–1730), Freiherr von Hohenburg, from Switzerland
- 1723 – Adam Graf Kollonits († 1726)
- 1723 – Ladislaus Freiherr von Ebergényi († 1724)
- 1723 – Johann Graf Caraffa († 1743)
- 1723 – Maximilian Adam Graf Starhemberg († 1741)
- 1723 – Herkules Graf von Montecuccoli († 1729)
- 1723 – Count Claude Florimond de Mercy (1666–1734)
- 1723 – Hermann Graf von Hohenzollern (1665–1733)
- 1723 – Antonio Conte Sormani († 1723)
- 1723 – Dominik von Königsegg-Rothenfels (1673–1751)
- 1723 – Hubert Dominik Du Saix d'Arnant († 1728)
- 1723 – Johann Damian Philipp Freiherr von und zu Sickingen († 1732)
- 1723 – Johann Hieronymus Freiherr von und Zum Jungen († 1732)
- 1723 – Johann Philipp Joseph Graf Harrach zu Rohrau (1678–1764)
- 1723 – Don Antonio Conde Puebla de Portugalo († 1723)
- 1723 – Heinrich Wilhelm Graf Wilczek († 1739)
- 1723 – Josep Antoni de Rubí i de Boixadors († 1723)
- 1724 – Don Giuseppe Boneo Conte della Caromina († 1724)
- 1726 – Fabian Graf Wrangel (1651–1737)
- 1729 – Carl Rudolf, Duke of Württemberg-Neuenstadt (1667–1742)
- 1734 – Dom Emanuel Infante of Portugal († 1766)
- 1736 – Theodor Fürst Lubomirski († 1745)
- 1737 – Leopold Philippe d'Arenberg (1690–1754)
- 1737 – Friedrich Graf von Seckendorf (1673–1763)
- 1737 – George Olivier Graf Wallis (1673–1744)
- 1737 – Ferdinand Maria Innocenz of Bavaria (1699–1738), a son of Maximilian II Emanuel, Elector of Bavaria
- 1737 – Viktor Graf Philippi (1739)
- 1737 – Ludwig Andreas von Khevenhüller (1683–1744)
- 1737 – Johann Christian Freiherr Seherr von Thoss († 1743)
- 1737 – Francis Stephen, Duke of Lorraine (1708–1765), married Maria Theresia, Holy Roman Emperor in 1745
- 1740 – Prince Charles Alexander of Lorraine (1712–1780)
- 1741 – Gundacker von Althan (de) (1665–1747)
- 1741 – Heinrich Joseph Graf Daun (1678–1761)
- 1741 – Kaspar Graf Cordova († 1765)
- 1741 – Johann Hermann Graf Nesselrode († 1751)
- 1741 – Maximilian of Hesse-Kassel (1689–1753), son of Charles I, Landgrave of Hesse-Kassel
- 1741 – Louis VIII, Landgrave of Hesse-Darmstadt (1691–1768)
- 1741 – Frederick Louis, Prince of Hohenzollern-Hechingen (1688–1750)
- 1741 – Johann Jakob de Vasquez y de la Puente, Conde de Vasquez de Pinos (1681–1754)
- 1741 – Otto Ferdinand Graf von Abensberg und Traun (1677–1748)
- 1741 – Wilhelm Reinhard von Neipperg (1684–1774)
- 1741 – Johann Georg Christian, Prince of Lobkowicz (1686–1753) – Imperial commander in Italy, Governor of Sicily
- 1741 – Prince Joseph of Saxe-Hildburghausen (1702–1787)
- 1741 – Joseph Graf Esterházy de Galantha († 1748)
- 1741 – Georg Emmerich Graf Csáky de Körösszegh († 1741)
- 1741 – Alexander Graf Károlyi de Nagy-Károly († 1743)
- 1741 – Samuel von Schmettau (1684–1751), joined the Prussian Army
- 1744 – Francesco Cavaliere Marulli († 1751)
- 1745 – Josef Wenzel, Prince of Liechtenstein (1696–1772), Reorganized the Artillery
- 1745 – Karl Fürst Batthyany (1697–1772)
- 1745 – Francisco Marqués de Los Rios († 1775)
- 1745 – Hermann Carl von Ogilvy († 1751)
- 1745 – Franz Rudolf Graf von Hohen-Ems (1686–1756)
- 1745 – Ernst Hartmann Freiherr von Diemar († 1754)
- 1746 – Karl August, Prince of Waldeck and Pyrmont (1704–1763)
- 1750 – Duke Louis Ernest of Brunswick-Lüneburg (1718–1788)
- 1751 – Franz Graf Esterházy de Galantha (1683–1754)
- 1751 – Claudius Fürst de Ligne (1685–1766)
- 1754 – Ägydius Marchese de Roma († 1761)
- 1754 – Ferdinand Prinz de Ligne († 1766)
- 1754 – Franz Wenzel, Count Wallis (1696–1774)
- 1754 – Anton Otto Marchese Botta d'Adorno (1688–1774)
- 1754 – Wolfgang Siegmund Freiherr von Damnitz († 1755)
- 1754 – Carl Urban Graf Chanclos († 1761)
- 1754 – Johann August Herzog zu Sachsen-Gotha (1704–1767)
- 1754 – Paul Carl Graf Pálffy ab Erdöd († 1774)
- 1754 – Philipp Ludwig Freiherr von Moltke († 1780)
- 1754 – Leopold Graf von Daun (1705–1766)
- 1754 – Niklas Leopold Rheingraf von Salm-Salm (1770)
- 1754 – Franz Ludwig Graf Sallaburg (Salburg) († 1758)
- 1754 – Maximilian Ulysses Reichsgraf von Browne (1705–1757)
- 1754 – Siegmund Friedrich Graf Gaisruck († 1769)
- 1754 – Ferdinand Charles, comte d'Aspremont-Lynden (1689–1772)
- 1754 – Giovanni Luca Conte di Pallavicini († 1773)
- 1754 – Ascanio Marchese Guadagni († 1759)
- 1754 – Wilhelm Pfalzgraf zu Birkenfeld († 1760)
- 1755 – Francesco III d'Este, Duke of Modena (1698–1780)
- 1758 – Count Palatine Frederick Michael of Zweibrücken (1724–1767)
- 1758 – Christian Moritz Graf Königsegg und Rothenfels († 1778)
- 1758 – Kajetan Graf Kolowrat-Krakowsky († 1769)
- 1758 – Carl Gustav Graf Kheul († 1758)
- 1758 – Franz Leopold von Nádasdy (1708–1783)
- 1758 – Ernst Graf Marschall auf Burgholzhausen († 1771)
- 1758 – Johann Baptist Graf Serbelloni († 1778)
- 1758 – Paul Anton Fürst Esterházy de Galantha (1711–1762)
- 1760 – Anton Ignaz, Count Mercy d'Argenteau († 1767)
- 1760 – Leopold, Count Pálffy-Daun von Erdöd (1716–1773)
- 1760 – Anton, Count Colloredo-Waldsee (1785)
- 1765 – Prince Albert of Saxony, Duke of Teschen (1738–1822), son-in-law of Maria Theresia
- 1766 – Carl Raimund Duke of Arenberg († 1778)
- 1766 – Franz Moritz von Lacy (1725–1801)
- 1766 – Archduke Leopold of Austria (1747–1792), Grand Duke of Tuscany, in 1790 Holy Roman Emperor
- 1766 – Ercole III d'Este, Duke of Modena (1727–1803)
- 1768 – August Georg, Markgraf von Baden-Baden (1706–1771)
- 1769 – Christoph, Prinz zu Baden-Durlach (1717–1789)
- 1770 – Nikolaus Joseph Esterházy von Galántha (1714–1790)
- 1772 – Archduke Ferdinand of Austria-Este (1754–1806)
- 1774 – Andreas Hadik von Futak (1710–1790), took Berlin on Oktober 16 1757
- 1778 – Friedrich Georg Heinrich, Count von Wied-Runkel († 1779)
- 1778 – Ernst Gideon von Laudon (1717–1790), General Laudon
- 1778 – Franz Ulrich, Fürst Kinsky zu Wchinic und Tettau († 1792)
- 1778 – Franz Ludwig, Count Thürheim († 1782)
- 1785 – Joseph Maria Carl, Fürst Lobkowitz († 1802)
- 1788 – Carl, Count Pellegrini († 1795)
- 1788 – Carl Borromäus Joseph, Fürst Liechtenstein († 1789)
- 1789 – Prince Josias of Saxe-Coburg (1737–1815)
- 1789 – Michael Johann Ignatz, Count Wallis (1731–1798)
- 1789 – Joseph, Count Colloredo-Waldsee († 1818)
- 1790 – Jakob Marchese Botta d’Adorno († 1803)
- 1790 – Blasius Columban, Baron von Bender (1713–1798)
- 1790 – Friedrich August, Duke von Nassau-Usingen († 1816)
- 1792 – Archduke Ferdinand of Austria, Grand Duke of Tuscany (1769–1824)
- 1795 – François Sebastien Charles Joseph de Croix, Count of Clerfayt
- 1795 – Dagobert Sigmund von Wurmser (1724–1797)
- 1796 – Friedrich Moritz, Count Nostitz-Rieneck († 1796)
- 1796 – Joseph, Count Kinsky zu Wchinic und Tettau († 1804)
- 1799 – Prince Alexander Suvorov (1729–1800)

== 19th century ==
- 1801 – Archduke Charles of Austria (1771–1847)

== See also ==
- List of Austrian field marshals
- List of German field marshals

== Sources ==
- Kaiserliche und k.k. Generale (1618-1815), by Dr. Antonio Schmidt-Brentano (München). Österreichisches Staatsarchiv
