= Jammers Minde =

17th century autobiography by Leonora Christina

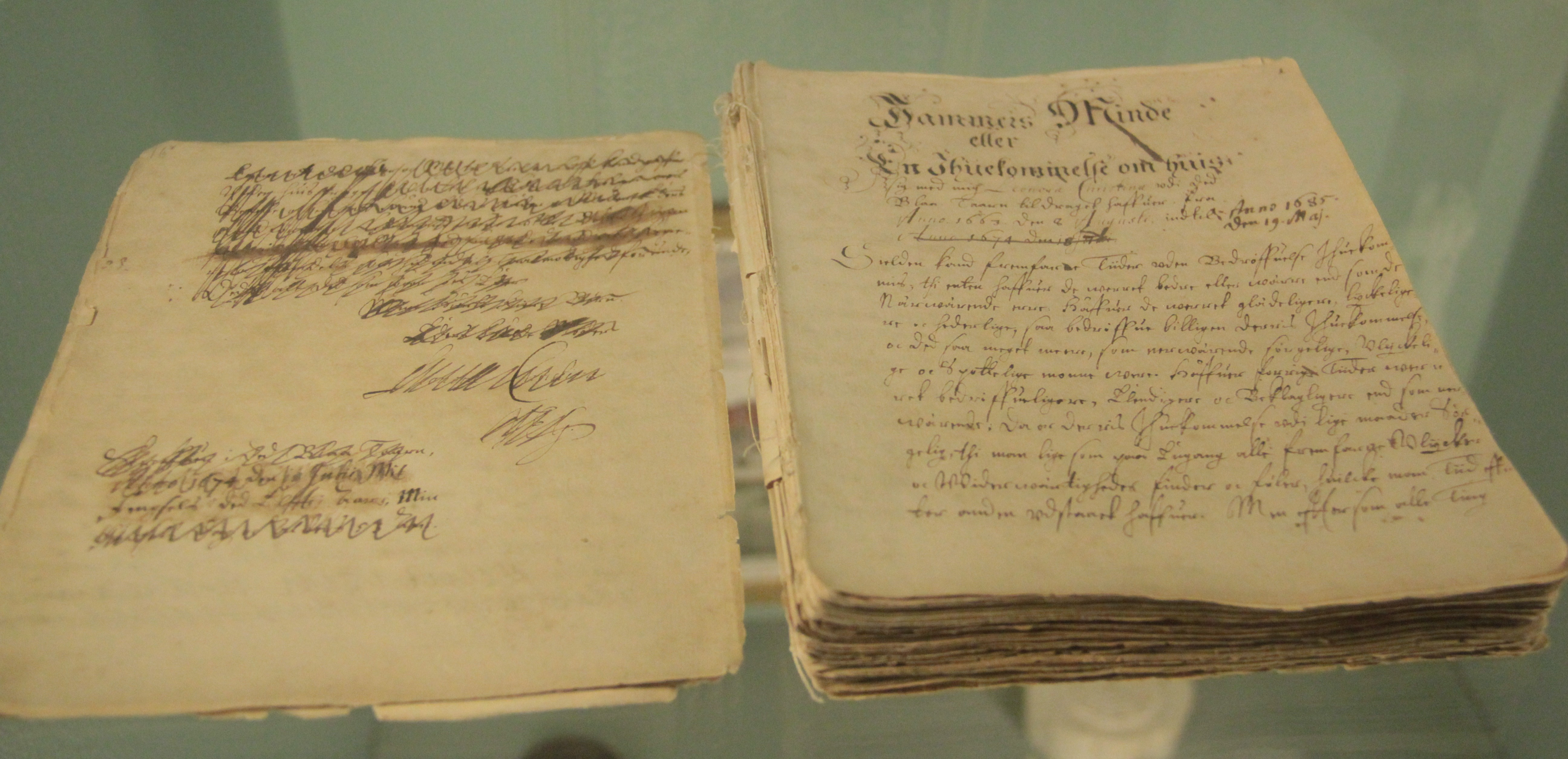
Jammers Minde

Jammers Minde (literally A Memory of Lament), translated into English as Memoirs of Leonora Christina, is an autobiography completed in 1674 by Leonora Christina, daughter of Christian IV of Denmark and Kirsten Munk. The work, first published in 1869, is included in the Danish Culture Canon. It is considered to be the finest piece of prose work written in 17th-century Denmark. It relates a partly fictionalized account of Christina's time during captivity, with a detailed personal account of prison life, often drawing upon biblical references and black humour, and contrasting the comical with the macabre. Radical for its period in its personal account, it is considered an existential religious writing.

== Background ==
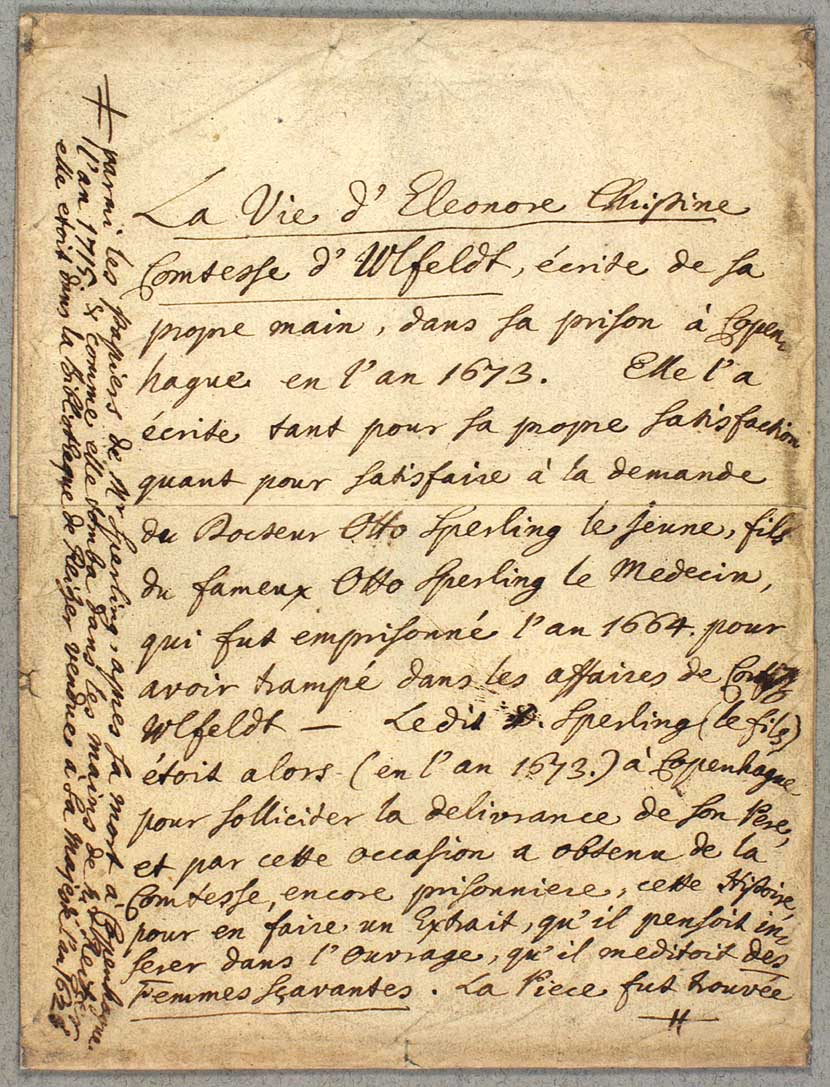
First page of Leonora's autobiography in French (1673)

Married to Corfitz Ulfeldt, Leonora Christina was imprisoned from 1663 to 1685 in the Blue Tower of Copenhagen Castle for presumed knowledge of her husband's treachery. When Christian V came to the throne in 1670, the conditions of her imprisonment were improved and she was given books and writing materials.

After writing a short autobiography in French in 1673, she embarked on Jammers Minde which she completed after her release from prison in 1685. After Leonora Christine's death, her son Leo Ulfeldt took the manuscript to Austria, where it was passed down univestigated to his descendants. It was only first investigated and published in 1869, attracting considerable attention.

== The work ==
Considered to be Denmark's most important 17th-century prose work, Jammers Minde is a defensive, intimate and dramatic account, which brings back to life the painful years of Leonora's imprisonment. It was written with a political and tactical purpose and is considered an existential religious writing, radical for its time in its reporting of personal confession and crisis. Leonora knew that the work would be more successful if it came across as an authentic account of her time within the prison walls so it displays many of her real experiences, but which are dramatized and fictionalized, and vividly and fully so.

Jammers Minde conveys the woman's conscious will to describe her experience without succumbing to her fate. It contains a host of vivid details: sights, smells and sounds, often conveyed with loathing — but also frequently juxtaposed with a grotesque twist of humour which only serves to make it all the more moving. Leonora's ability to describe the appearance and behaviour of those she was forced to come into contact with has left a picture of a series of insignificant figures, mainly women, who would otherwise have been forgotten. One of the reasons the work has become a literary masterpiece is that the author manages to couch her account in a fine, dignified style, giving elegance and shine to even the most lurid details. According to her account, her female attendants appeared to suffer more than she did; they felt the effects of anxiety, fever and alcoholism, while she remained in good health during her time in captivity, apart from a single case of gallstones.

Leonora frequently draws upon biblical stories and characters and God in her depiction of prison life, recreating the prison in part as a scene in the Bible and her jailors and enemies into characters in her Christian Passion. Sophie Amalie for instance is portrayed as Salome, stepdaughter of Herod Antipas, who called for John the Baptist to be beheaded. Languages also play an important and complex role in Jammers Minde. It is mainly written in Danish, and Leonora translates much of the Low German, High German and French dialogue into Danish, but later on in the story adds more depth to her characters by writing in the original language, and demonstrates her superior knowledge of languages by often replying in a language they cannot understand. Leonora's allies are usually French-speaking, sending her letters or conversing intimately with her. Anne-Marie Mai highlights the psychological meaning of the autobiography and how the account can be viewed as a "monument for her spiritual and moral triumph over her adversaries, the evil agents of power, the flesh ungodly."
