= Leonora Christina =

Leonora Christina may refer to:

- Leonora Christina Ulfeldt (1621–1698), Danish author of Jammers Minde
- Leonora Christina (ship), a ferry of BornholmerFærgen which is called after Leonora Christina Ulfeldt
