= List of governors of Luxembourg =

The following is a list of governors of Luxembourg.

From the 15th to the 19th centuries, the Duchy (later Grand-Duchy) of Luxembourg was ruled by the French, the Burgundians, the Spanish and Austrian Habsburgs, and the Dutch.

From 1848 onwards, when Luxembourg received its first constitution, it started to be administered, by a government in the modern sense of the word, one which was accountable to an elected Luxembourgish legislature.

Start date	End date	Name	Notes
French Governors
1 September 1542	10 September 1542	Claude de Lorraine, Duke of Guise (1496-1550)	
12 September 1543	1544	François d'Anglure (died 1544)	
1544	6 August 1544	Francis I, Duke of Nevers (1516-1562)	
Spanish Governors and Captains-General
2 July 1545	23 May 1604	Peter Ernst I von Mansfeld-Vorderort (1517-1604)	(French prisoner from 22 June 1552 to 18 May 1557)
1552	1553	Lamoral, Count of Egmont	Representing Mansfeld
1553	7 June 1555	Martin van Rossem (1490-1555)	Representing Mansfeld
7 June 1555	September 1556	Charles de Brimeu, Count of Megen	Representing Mansfeld
September 1556	February 1557	Johann von Naves, sieur de Sivry	Provisionally for Mansfeld
June 1604	1627	Florent, comte de Berlaimont (died 1627)	
April 1627	1636	Christopher of East Frisia (1569–1636)	
1636	18 January 1642	Philipp Dietrich von Manderscheid-Blankenheim (1596-1653)	Andrea Cantelmo (August 1637 to November 1637)
18 January 1642	30 August 1648	Johann von Beck (1588-1648)	The first Luxembourger
15 January 1646	November 1646	Alonso, marchese Strozzi	(Provisionally for Beck)
1648	19 June 1650	Philippe François de Croy, Duke of Havré (1610–1650)	
19 June 1650	August 1650	Gilles, marquis de Mollinguin	(Provisionally)
August 1650	1652	Alonso, marchese Strozzi	(Provisionally)
1652	24 January 1654	Francesco Sanchez de Pardo	(Provisionally)
24 January 1654	12 January 1675	Philippe de Ligne-Arenberg, prince de Chimay et de Croy d'Arenberg (1619-1675)	(a Duke from 9 June 1645)
1675		Jean-Charles-Chrétien de Sandas et Louvegnies, Baron de Grandcourt	(Provisionally)
1676		Jean Charles de Watteville Marquis de Conflans	(Provisionally)
1675	1680	John Francis Desideratus, Prince of Nassau-Siegen (1626-1699)	
1680	1684	Ernest-Alexandre Dominique de Ligne-Arenberg Croÿ, prince de Chimay et de Croÿ d'Arenberg (1643-1686)	
French Governors
12 June 1684	July 1686	Henri de Lambert, marquis de Lambert et de Saint Bris, Baron de Citry (1631-1686)	Lieutenant-General
10 August 1686	July 1687	Louis François, duc de Boufflers (1644-1711)	
25 July 1687	1690	Nicolas Catinat (1637-1712)	(a Lieutenant-General from March 1690)
1690	1697?	Henri d'Harcourt (1654-1718)	
1697	15 November 1697	Louis-François du Parc, Marquis de Locmaria (1647-1709)	
Spanish Governors and Captains-General
15 November 1697	1713	Graf Jean-Frédéric d'Autel (1645-1716)	The second Luxembourger
Hessian Governors
1713	1714	Reinhardt Vincent von Hompesch (1660-1733)	
1714	1715?	Johann Rabo van Keppel (1671?- 1733)	
Austrian Governors
5 January 1715	4 December 1716	Bertram Anton Freiherr von Wachtendonk	
4 December 1716	17 April 1719	Johann Franz von Bronkhorst zu Gronsveld und Eberstein (d. 1719)	
1719	July 1720	Maximilien de Pasqualini (died 1720)	
1720	1722	Adolf Christian Freiherr von Galen (died 1722)	
March 1722	27 April 1727	Johann Wilhelm Freiherr von Unruhe (died 1727)	
29 May 1727	October 1729	Graf Franz Anton Paul von Wallis (1677-1737)	
October 1729	7 May 1730	Philippe Henri de Magawly, Baron de Cabry (1675–1756)	1st time Provisionally
7 May 1730	22 May 1731	Wilhelm Reinhard von Neipperg (1684-1774)	1st time
22 May 1731	22 February 1732	Philippe Henri de Magawly, Baron de Cabry	2nd time, Provisionally
22 February 1732	5 May 1733	Adam Sigismund Freiherr von Thüngen (1687-1745)	1st time Provisionally Fort Thüngen
5 May 1733	22 June 1734	Wilhelm Reinhard von Neipperg	2nd time
22 June 1734	30 July 1736	Sigismund Freiherr von Thüngen	2nd time (provisionally)
30. July 1736	January 1737	Wilhelm Reinhard von Neipperg	3rd time
January 1737	April 1737	Georges Adolphe d'Olizy (died 1739)	1st time (provisionally) Fort Olizy
April 1737	May 1737	Antoine de Peissant, comte de Rumigny (died 1748)	(Provisionally)
May 1737	January 1738	Wilhelm Reinhard von Neipperg	4th time
January 1738	16 May 1739	Georges Adolphe d'Olizy	2nd time (Provisionally)
1739	17 September 1742	Karl Urban, Count of Chanclos (1686-1761)	Provisionally
17 September 1742	1743	Holtzapfel	Provisionally
1743	March 1744	Melligny	Provisionally
March 1744	1753	Wilhelm Reinhard von Neipperg	5th time
1753	20 October 1755	Eberhard von Gemmingen-Hornberg (died 1767)	1st time (provisionally)
20 October 1755	1766	Ernst Dietrich Marschall von Burgholzhausen (1692-1771)	
1756	1763	Eberhard Freiherr von Gemmingen	2nd time, provisionally for Marschall von Biberstein
1766	May 1773	Maximilian Friedrich Ernst forst von Salm-Salm (1732 -1773)	
2 January 1767	1785	Christian Jakob Freiherr von Vogelsang	Provisionally for Salm-Salm until May 1773
1 September 1785	7 June 1795	Blasius Columban von Bender (1713–1798)	(in Opposition 15 December 1792 until 28 April 1793)
French Republic and Empire Governors
1800	1800	Johann Birnbaum	
1800	1808	Jean-Baptiste Lacoste	
1808	1814	André Joseph Jourdan	
Dutch Governors
2 September 1815	31 December 1830	Jean Georges Othon Victorin M. Zacharie Willmar (1763-1831)	Provisionally until 29 May 1817; his son Jean-Jacques Willmar later became prime minister
Dutch Governors-General
1 January 1831	5 March 1831	Jean Leclerc (1765-1836)	Provisionally
5 March 1831	27 May 1831	Prince Bernhard of Saxe-Weimar-Eisenach (1792–1862)	
Belgian Governors (in Arlon)
5 October 1830	16 October 1830	François d'Hoffschmit (1797-1854)	(commissioner-general)
16 October 1830	1832	Jean Baptiste Thorn (1783-1841)	
19 April 1832	21 September 1834	Jean N. Rossignon	
21 September 1834	10 December 1834	Feuillien-Charles-Marie-Joseph de Coppin (1800-1887)	
10 December 1834	19. January 1839	Victorin Jean François, baron de Steenhault (1791-1841)	
Head of the government commission (in Luxembourg)
27 May 1831	18 June 1839	Friedrich Wilhelm von Goedecke (1771-1857)	
Head of the civil administration
16 June 1839	21 October 1840	Hans Daniel Ludwig Friedrich Hassenpflug (1794-1862)	
21 October 1840	1 January 1842	Jean Baptiste Gellé (1777-1847)	
Governor
1 January 1842	1 August 1848	Gaspar-Théodore-Ignace de la Fontaine (1787-1871)	Provisionally until 6 June 1842

== See also ==
- List of prime ministers of Luxembourg
