= Sophie Amalie Lindenov =

Danish noblewoman and landowner

Suo jure Baroness of Lindenborg
- Reign: 1681 - 4 August 1688
- Predecessor: Title established
- Successor: Christian Gyldenløve
- Born: 4 July 1649; Kalundborg Castle, Zealand, Denmark
- Died: 4 August 1688 (aged 39)
- Noble family: Lindenov
- Spouse: Claus Daa
- Issue: Hans Daa
- Father: Hans Lindenov
- Mother: Elisabeth Augusta of Schleswig-Holstein

Sophie Amalie Lindenov, Baroness of Lindenborg (4 July 1649 – 4 August 1688) was a Danish noblewoman and landowner. She was Baroness of Lindenborg and the owner of Lindenborg Castle.

== Biography ==
Lindenov was born at Kalundborg Castle ( Kalundborg Slot) on Zealand, Denmark. Her parents were Hans Lindenov, a nobleman of Bavarian origins who had been made a Knight of the Order of the Elephant in 1648 and was a member of the Danish Council of State, and Countess Elisabeth Augusta af Schleswig-Holstein, a morganatic daughter of King Christian IV of Denmark and Kirsten Munk.

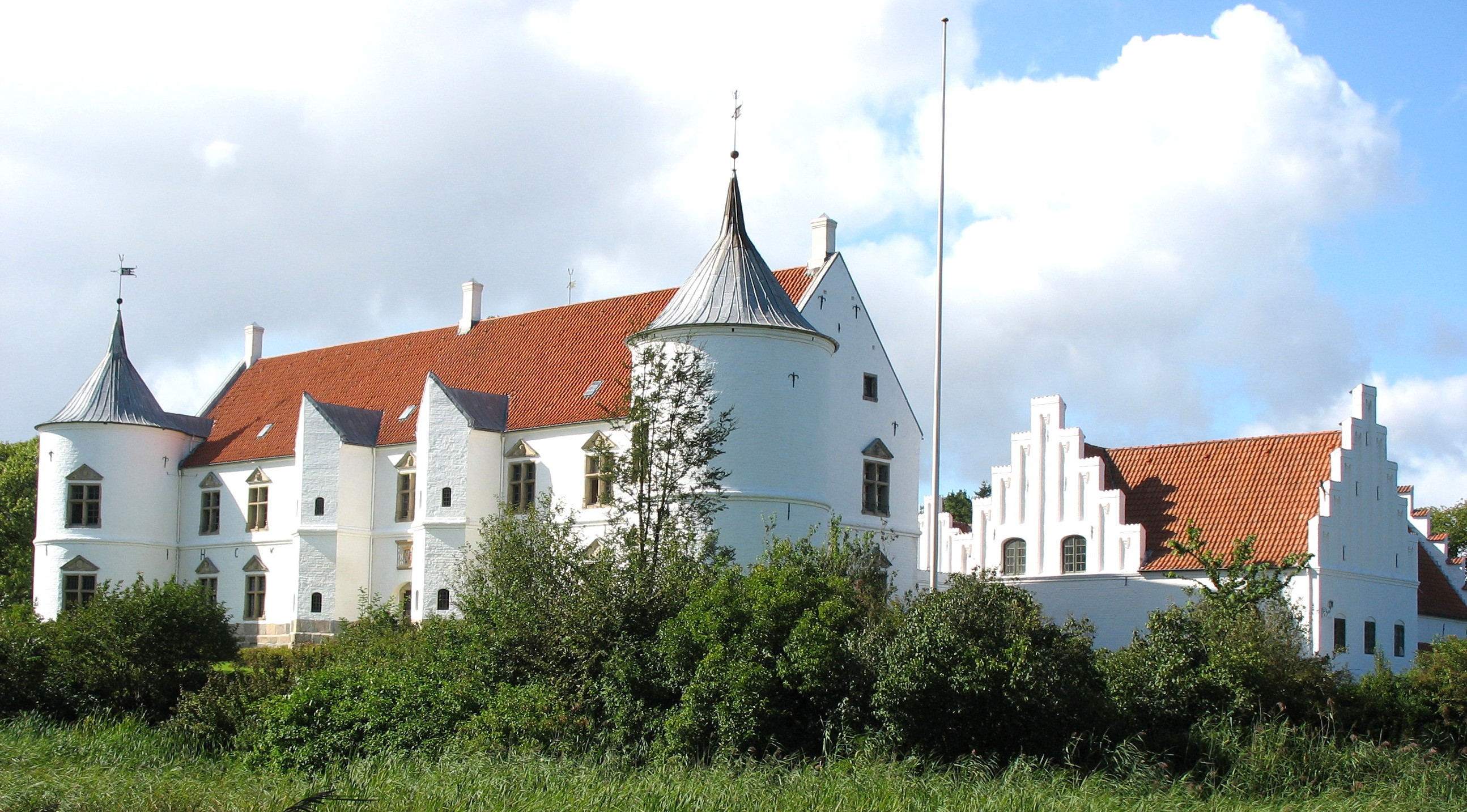
Lindenborg Castle

In 1674 she married nobleman Claus Daa (1640-1678) owner of the estates Krengerup and Brahesholm on Funen. Their only child, a son named Hans after his maternal grandfather, was born in Aalborg on 5 December 1677. One year later, on 8 December 1678, her husband was murdered, and three months later, on 26 March 1679, her son also died. Now a very wealthy widow, she became famous for her extravagant lifestyle, living—it was said—"blindly according to passion, promiscuity and greed".

In 1679, she sold the Funen properties and in 1681 acquired Lindenborg Castle (Lindenborg Slot) on Himmerland in northeastern Jutland. In 1681, King Christian V of Denmark created her Baroness of Lindenborg (Baroniet Lindenborg). She received this title and fief suo jure on the condition that she not marry again and that she made the King's brother, Christian Gyldenløve (1674-1703), her heir.

At 10 o'clock on 19 May 1685, she was sent to release her maternal aunt Leonora Christina, Countess Ulfeldt from the Blåtårn, where Leonora had been imprisoned for over two decades. In 1688, Sophie Lindenov took ill with some sort of extremely painful illness. On her deathbed she confessed to the murder of her late husband.

The Baroness became a legend in the local folklore.
