= Leo Ulfeldt =

Count Leo Ulfeldt (also spelled Uhlefeld) (Copenhagen, 22 March 1651 – Vienna, 11 April 1716), was a Danish nobleman who fled to Austria, where he became a Field Marshal of the Holy Roman Empire and Viceroy of Catalonia.

== Family and Origin ==
His mother was Leonora Christina, daughter of King Christian IV of Denmark, who married Corfitz Ulfeldt at the age of 15. His father soon rose to become the most powerful man in Denmark and, as Steward of the Realm, guided the country's fortunes.
Soon after the King's death, however, he fell out of favor with his successor, Frederick III and the family was forced to leave the country.
The deposed politician, who continued to strive for influence and power, became entangled in various intrigues, which escalated to treason. This did not diminish Leonora's love, and she traveled to England to reclaim a sum of money he had once lent to King Charles II of England. The King evaded his obligation to pay, had Leonora arrested and extradited to Denmark. There, she was held as a state prisoner under degrading conditions in the "Blue Tower" in Copenhagen for 22 years, from 1663 to 1685. Her husband drowned near Basel in 1664.

Their son, Leo however, found refuge in Austria and entered imperial service – initially under a false name.

== In Austrian Service ==
In 1682, Leo Ulfeldt was given command of a company of infantry under Field Marshal Raimondo Montecuccoli. Not long thereafter, he was entrusted with the command of a cavalry regiment. With this regiment, he distinguished himself in battle against the Turks, particularly when, with 80 Cuirassiers, he successfully defended a pass against 2,000 Tatars. He was subsequently promoted to Major general. In 1702, he participated in the Battle of Luzzara and in 1703, under Count Guido Starhemberg, he decisively defeated the enemy at Bormio.
When the future Emperor Charles VI asserted his claim to the Spanish throne, Ulfeldt accompanied him to Spain as a troop commander, where they landed in Barcelona in 1704. In the ensuing War of the Spanish Succession, he rendered such outstanding service to Charles's cause that he was promoted to field marshal and appointed Viceroy of Catalonia in 1706.
In the same year, he also participated in the successful Defense of Barcelona. The fighting dragged on for many years. But when Spain finally was lost for the House of Habsburg in 1714 and Barcelona had to be evacuated, he also returned to Austria. There, he was appointed captain of the Hartschier lifeguard and privy councillor by Emperor Charles, positions he held until his death in Vienna at the age of 65.

== Ancestry ==
Ancestors of Leo Ulfeldt

16. Knud Ebbesen Ulfeldt
8. Jacob Ulfeldt Sr.
17. Anne Eriksdatter Hardenberg
4. Jacob Ulfeldt Jr.
18. Jacob Hermansen Fleming
9. Anne Jakobsdatter Flemming
19. Maren Mogensdatter Juel
2. Corfitz Ulfeldt
20. Frands Mikkelsen Brockenhuus
10. Laurids Brockenhuus
21. Anne Lauridsdatter Tinhuus
5. Birgitte Brockenhuus
22. Peder Christiernsen Skram
11. Karen Pedersdatter Skram
23. Elsebet Tygesdatter Krabbe
1. Leo Ulfeldt
24. Christian III of Denmark
12. Frederick II of Denmark
25. Dorothea of Saxe-Lauenburg
6. Christian IV of Denmark
26. Ulrich, Duke of Mecklenburg
13. Sophie of Mecklenburg-Güstrow
27. Elizabeth of Denmark
3. Leonora Christina Ulfeldt
28. Ludvik Mogensen Munk
14. Ludvig Ludviksen Munk
29. Kirsten Pedersdatter Lykke
7. Kirsten Munk
30. Jørgen Pedersen Marsvin
15. Ellen Jørgensdatter Marsvin
31. Karen Ottesdatter Gyldenstierne

=== Marriage and children ===
In 1697, he married Countess Anna Maria Sinzendorf and had two sons :

- Anton Corfiz Ulfeldt (1699–1769), became an Austrian politician and diplomat.
- Franz Anton Ulfeldt (1711–1741/43), became a Privy Councilor and Sergeant Major in 1736.
