= Portrait of a Gentleman (Mellin) =

Painting by Charles Mellin

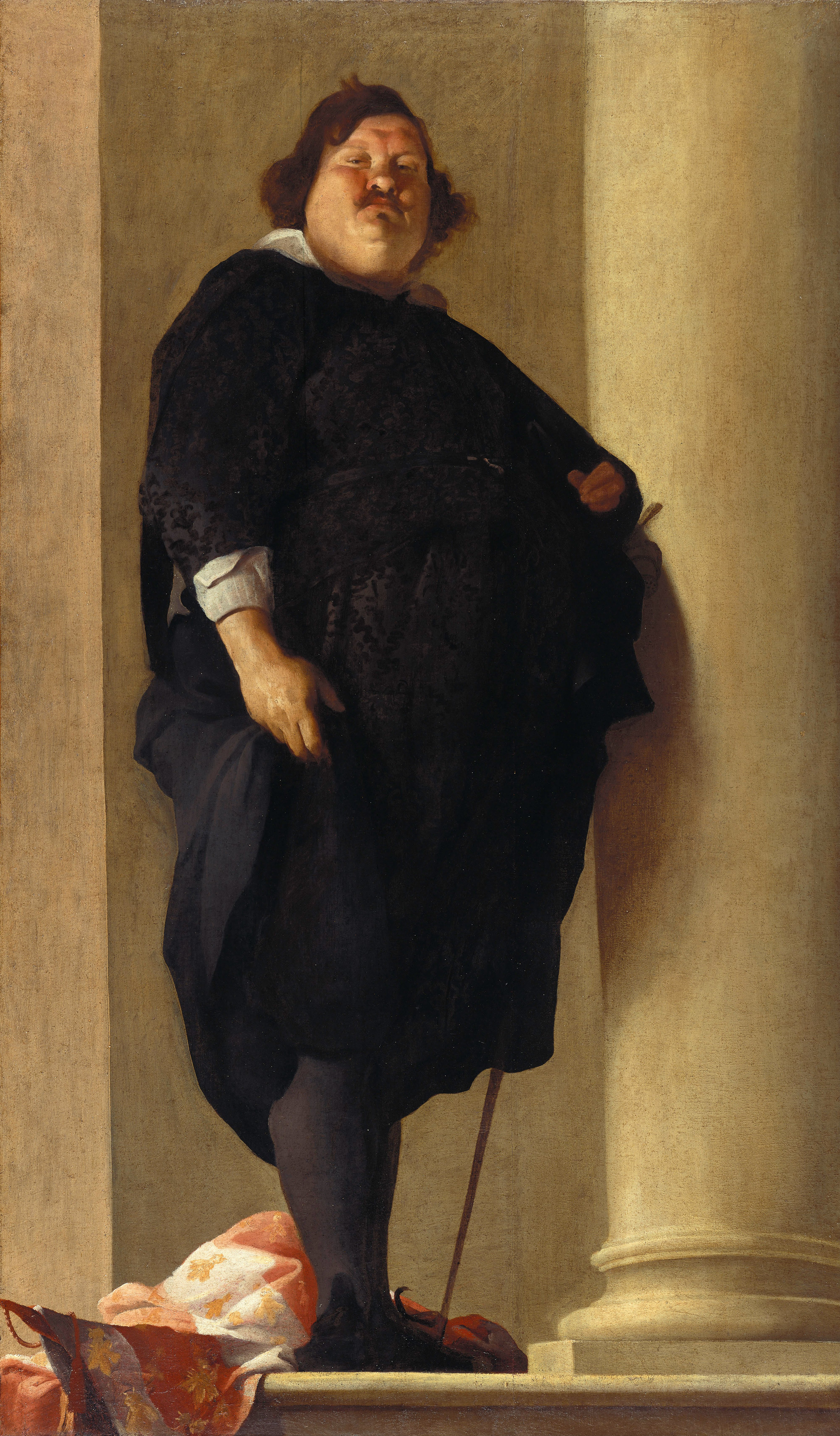
Portrait of a Gentleman, c. 1645, Attributed to Charles Mellin. Oil on canvas, 203 x 121 cm. Staatliche Museen, Berlin

Portrait of a Gentleman (or sometimes The Tuscan General Alessandro dal Borro) is a c. 1645 oil-on-canvas painting usually attributed to the French Baroque artist Charles Mellin. It is in the collection of the Gemäldegalerie, Berlin.

== Background and description ==
It is believed, but not established for certain, that it was commissioned by Alessandro dal Borro (1600–56), a Tuscan general, who fought with Mattias de' Medici in the Castro war against Pope Urban VII. Proud of his career and character, presumably dal Borro asked that the painter to do his likeness not shy away from depicting his stout build. As such, the work is highly regarded for its amusing geniality. It is noted for being frank and striking, and as one of the earliest honest depictions of obesity.

The portrait shows the man in full profile, standing next to a stone pillar, looking to his right, with a banner at his feet, bearing a coat of arms thought to be of Barberini family. He has thick red hair, a double chin and round, pudgy cheeks.

It has been attributed to a number of artists over the centuries, including Velázquez, Bernini and Andrea Sacchi. Today it is generally thought to be the work of Mellin, although there is no definitive evidence.

== Sources ==
- Power, Michael; Schulkin, Jay. The Evolution of Obesity. Johns Hopkins University Press, 2013. ISBN 978-1-4214-0960-3
- Laveissière, Sylvain. "The "Master of Pseudo-Borro": Charles Mellin?". Jahrbuch der Berliner Museen, 32. Bd, 1990 (in French)
- Vigarello, Georges. The Metamorphoses of Fat: A History of Obesity. Columbia University Press, 2013. ASIN: B00APDGH0Y
