= Alessandro dal Borro =

Marchese Alessandro dal Borro
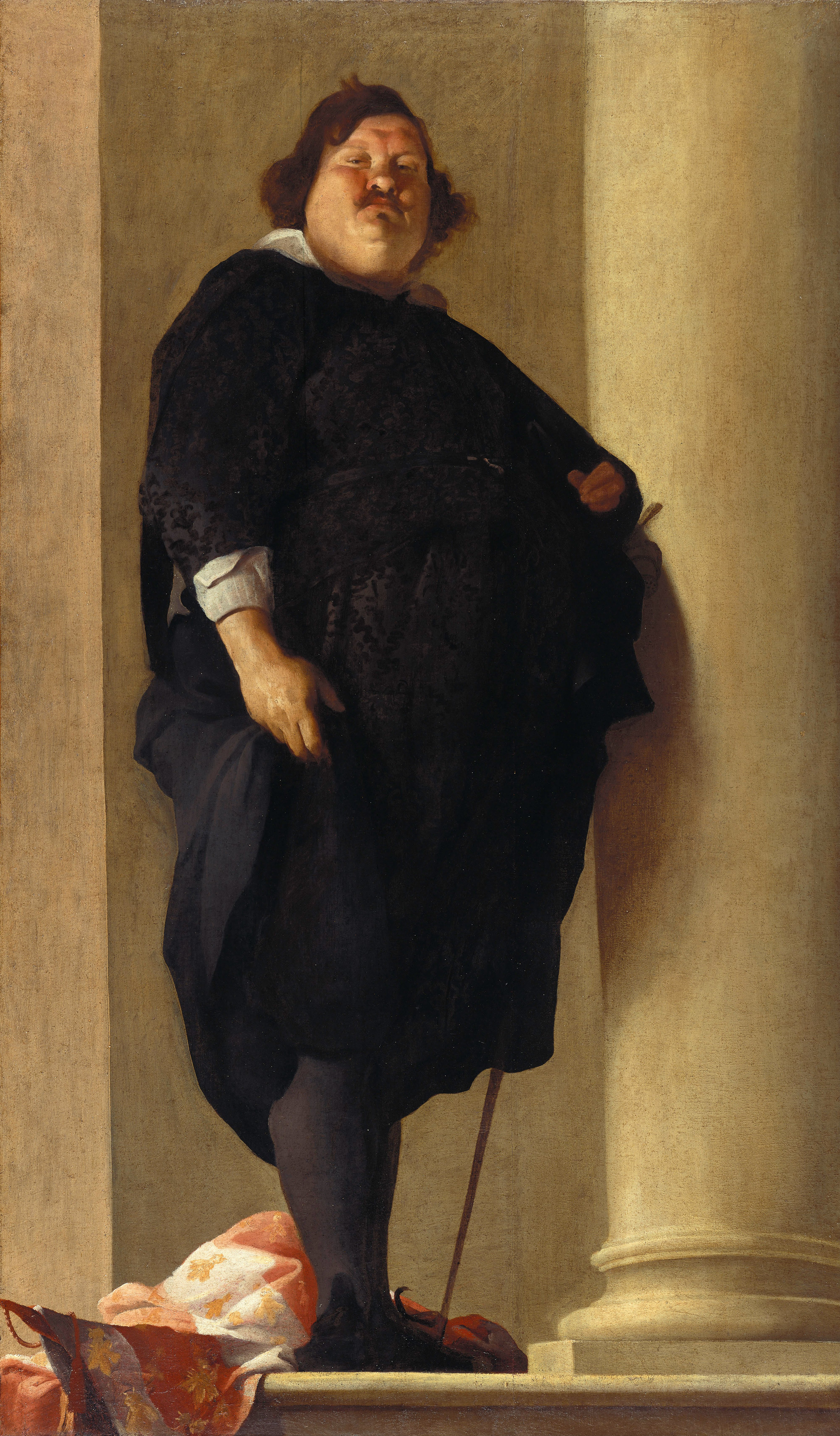
- Portrait of a Gentleman. Alessandro dal Borro was known for his obesity
- Born: April 22, 1600; Arezzo
- Died: December 2, 1656 (aged 56); Corfu
- Occupations: Tuscan nobleman, general and military engineer
- Known for: Field Marshal of the Holy Roman Empire

Marchese Alessandro dal Borro (22 April 1600 – 2 December 1656, Corfu) was a Tuscan nobleman, general and military engineer. He became a Field Marshal of the Holy Roman Empire amongst other honours. He is now most famous for his possible depiction in the painting Portrait of a Gentleman, often discussed in relationship to the history of obesity, though debates over the sitter's identity and the artist continue.

== Early life, family and education ==
Alessandro dal Borro was born in Arezzo, the son of Girolamo dal Borro, a military leader and poet from a noble family. Alessandro studied mathematics and engineering in Florence with the architect and designer Giulio Parigi.

== Career ==
Destined for a military career, he took part in the Thirty Years' War in the ranks of the company of captain Ottavio Piccolomini, who the Grand Duke of Tuscany, Cosimo II de Medici, sent to Germany to help his brother-in-law, emperor Ferdinand II. Dal Borro gained many victories on the battlefield, and received for this two baronies and was admitted to the Bohemian nobility.

The Grand Duke of Tuscany Ferdinand II de Medici called him back to Florence and named him commander of the army of the Grand Duchy. On 29 July 1643, for services rendered to the Grand Duchy, he gave him the marquisate of Borro. He then went to Madrid to fight for Philip IV of Spain, before being employed by Venice to fight against Turkish armies, where he earned the nickname "Terror of the Turks".

== Demise and legacy ==
Alessandro del Borro died in 1656 in Corfu as a result of wounds received in battle with Barbary pirates. In the management of his estate in Arezzo, he was succeeded by his son Niccolò del Borro (1644–1690) who, like his father, was a career soldier who died in battle.
