= Ernest-Dominique of Arenberg, 10th Prince of Chimay =

Ernest Alexandre Dominique d’Arenberg (26 December 1643 – 3 June 1686 in Pamplona) was the 10th Prince of Chimay and a member of the Sovereign House of Arenberg. He was in Spanish service and, among other things, Governor of the Duchy of Luxembourg and Viceroy of Navarre.

== Life ==
He was the son of Philippe of Arenberg, 9th prince de Chimay, former governor of the Duchy of Luxembourg. His mother was Theodora Maximilienne van Gaveren Herimez. After his father's death, he was entitled de Ligne, Duc d’Arenberg, Prince de Chimay, Comte de Beaumont et de Frezin, Baron de Hallwyn et de Commines, Seigneur d’Avesnes and Pair de Hainaut.

Like his father, he was in the service of the Spanish King in the Spanish Netherlands and from 1680 to 1684 was Governor and Captain-general of the Duchy of Luxembourg and the County of Chiny. Since 1675 he was also a Knight in the Order of the Golden Fleece. In the same year he married Maria de Cardenas in Madrid, a Lady-in-Waiting of the Spanish Queen. The marriage remained childless.

As governor of Luxembourg, he headed the city's defense against various attempts by Louis XIV. During the Siege of 1684, he was able to hold the city against a superior force for a few months, but was finally forced to surrender, and to leave the city with the remainder of his troops. In 1685, he became Viceroy of the Spanish part of Navarre, where he died the next year.

Since he died without heirs, he was succeeded by his aunt Anna Katharina de Ligne. After her death, the title of Prince of Chimay passed to the House of D'Henin-Lietard of her husband Eugène de Hénin, 6th Count of Bossu.

== Sources ==
- Johann Christian von Stramberg: Denkwürdiger und nützlicher Rheinischer Antiquarius. Mittelrhein, III. Abteilung, Bd.1 Koblenz, 1853 Pages 740–741.
- Bernhard von Zech: Europäischer Herold oder Zuverlässige Beschreibung Derer Europäisch-Christlichen Kayserthums, Königreiche, freyer Staaten und Fürstenthümer. Leipzig, 1705, page 548.
