= Copenhagen Castle =

Castle in Copenhagen, Denmark, demolished 1731

Coordinates: 55°40′38″N 12°34′48″E

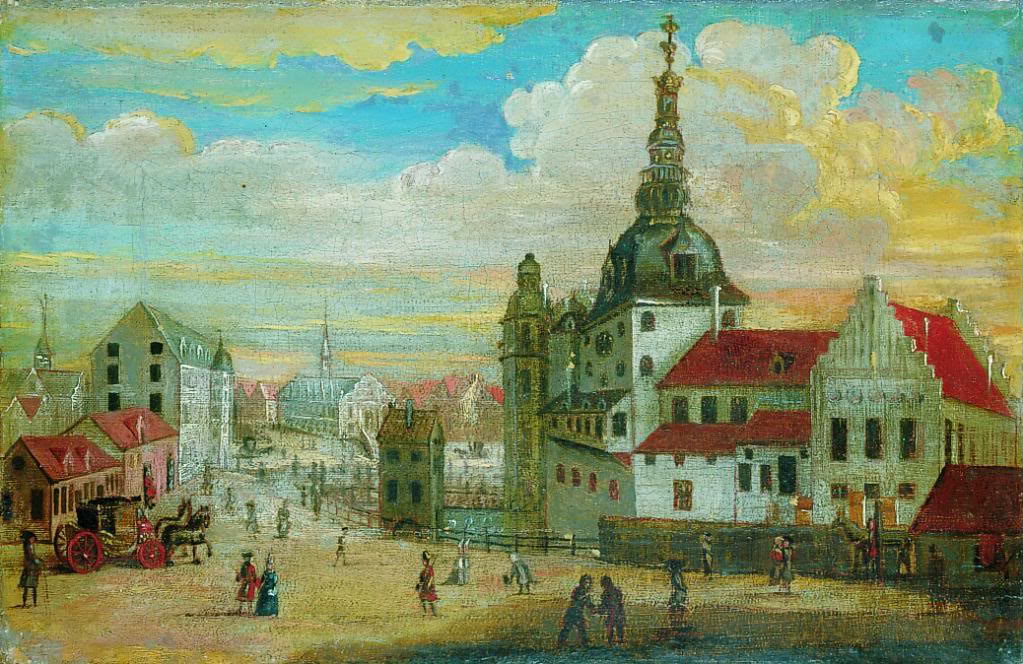
- Copenhagen Castle painted in 1698 by unknown artist
- Interactive map of the Copenhagen Castle area

General information
- Location: Copenhagen, Denmark
- Construction started: Late 14th century
- Demolished: 1731

Copenhagen Castle (Danish: Københavns Slot) was a royal castle on the islet of Slotsholmen in central Copenhagen, Denmark, on the site of the current Christiansborg Palace. It replaced the older stronghold traditionally associated with Bishop Absalon's fortification of 1167 (Absalon's Castle), which was demolished by the forces of Lübeck in 1369 after the Hanseatic League's capture of Copenhagen. The new castle arose on the same strategically important site by the harbour and, from the late Middle Ages, became one of the kingdom's most important political and dynastic centres.

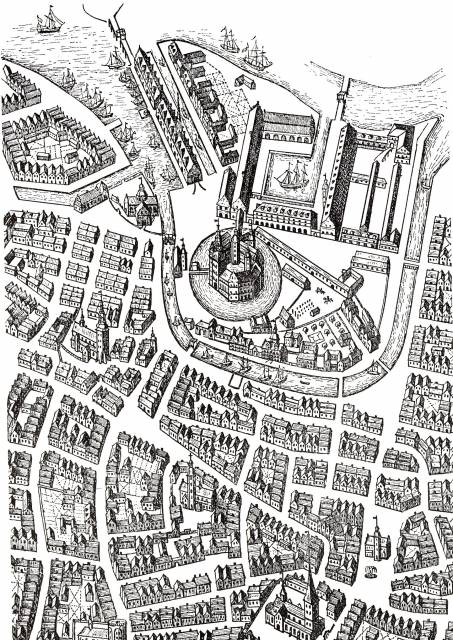
Slotsholmen in 1674, with Copenhagen Castle in the centre and Christian IV's Exchange (Børsen) and Arsenal (Tøjhuset) at the top of the image

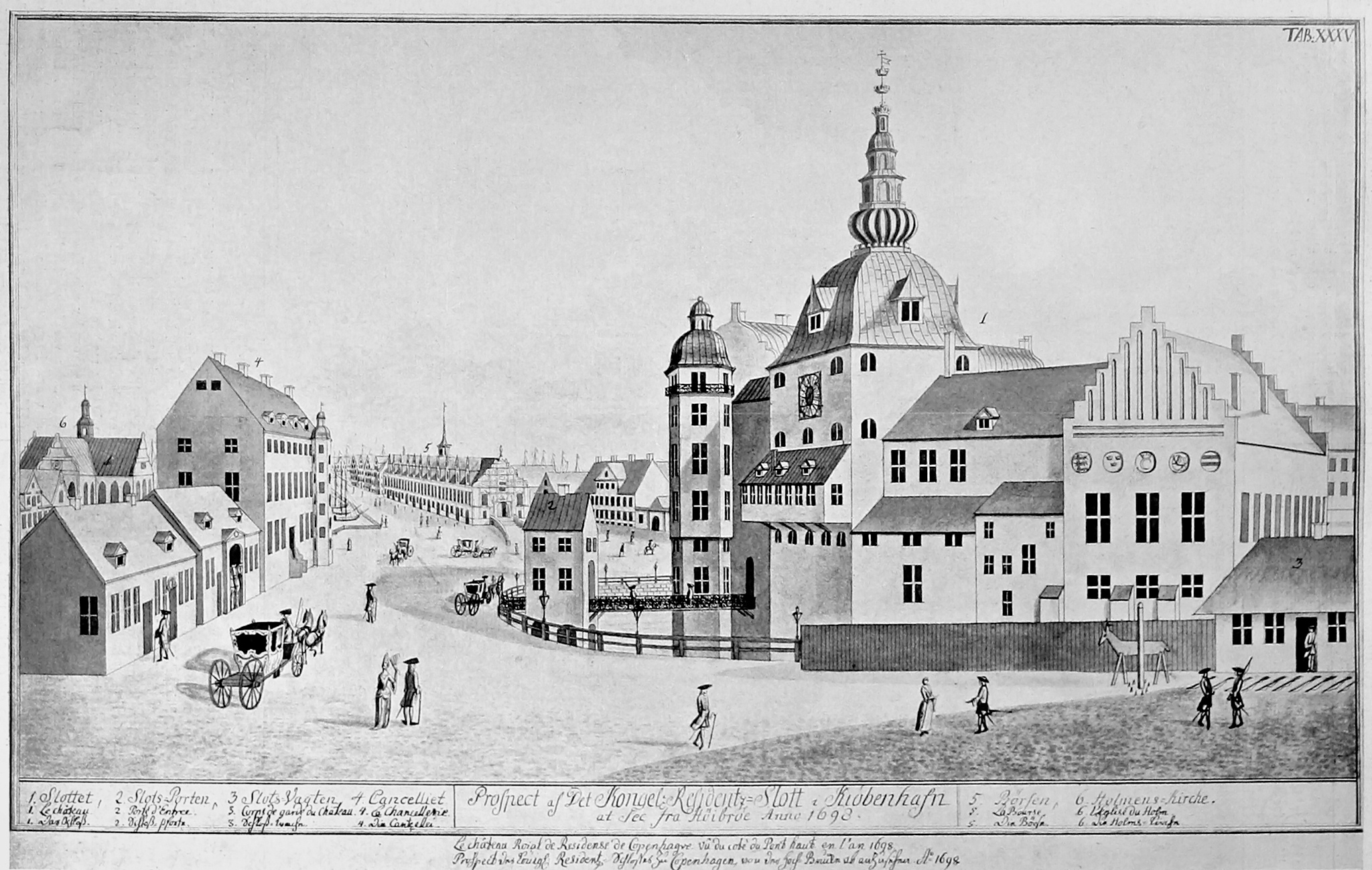
Copenhagen Castle, copperplate engraving from 1698 by Carl Otto

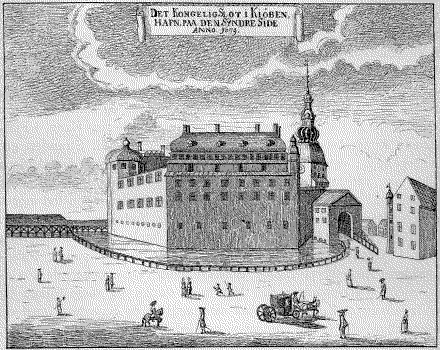
Copenhagen Castle seen on illustration from Peder Hansen Resen's Atlas Danica

== History ==
In 1167, Bishop Absalon (c. 1128–1201) founded a fortress on Slotsholmen in the harbour of Copenhagen, consisting of a courtyard with several buildings surrounded by a defensive wall. After the demolition of Absalon's Castle by the Hanseatic League in 1369, the ruins on the islet were covered with earthworks, on which a new stronghold was built in the years that followed; it eventually came to bear the name Copenhagen Castle. The exact date of construction is not known, but a bailiff (høvedsmand) is mentioned at the site in 1387, suggesting the new castle was likely completed by then.

In 1343 King Valdemar Atterdag had taken over Absalon's Castle, but upon his death in 1375 the right to the property returned to the Diocese of Roskilde. The new castle was therefore built either by Valdemar Atterdag or by Bishop Niels Jacobsen Ulfeldt of Roskilde.

The bishops of Roskilde retained ownership of the castle until King Eric of Pomerania seized it in 1417, thereby securing — after more than 200 years of dispute — definitive royal ownership of the fortification on Slotsholmen. Eric of Pomerania's takeover of Copenhagen Castle was part of his policy of strengthening control over the trade route through the Øresund, a policy that also included the construction of Krogen at Helsingør (the predecessor of Kronborg), Landskrone and Malmøhus.

In response to Eric of Pomerania's Øresund policy, a powerful fleet of the Hanseatic League attacked the castle and town in 1428, in the Bombardment of Copenhagen during the Dano-Hanseatic War (1426–1435). The attack was repelled by Eric of Pomerania's queen, Philippa of England, who led the defence from Copenhagen Castle.

The castle became a royal residence when Christopher of Bavaria moved to Copenhagen in 1443, after his residence at Roskilde burned down. Under Christopher and the kings who followed, the importance of Copenhagen Castle grew, and it gradually became the monarchy's preferred residence. At the same time, the castle became the centre of the kingdom's government. Although the king in principle remained in constant progress around the realm, bringing his administration, the kancelli (chancery), with him, from the mid-15th century Copenhagen Castle began to be regarded as the chancery's permanent seat. The central treasury administration was likewise attached to the castle, and from the mid-15th century taxes and royal revenues from across the country were brought to "the tower at Copenhagen Castle". Under Christopher of Bavaria an administrative archive was established at the castle, and in 1582 all the kingdom's records were gathered in "the Vault at Copenhagen Castle".

The castle's growing importance is also reflected in its selection as the setting for Christopher of Bavaria's wedding to Dorothea of Brandenburg in 1445. Four years later, the castle was again the setting for another of Dorothea's weddings, this time to Christopher's successor, Christian I. In 1515 the castle was the setting for Christian II's wedding to Isabella of Austria.

During the revolt against Christian II in 1523, the town of Copenhagen remained loyal to the king. When Christian II sailed to the Low Countries to gather reinforcements, he entrusted the castle to his supporter Henrik Gøye. After a siege lasting from June to December 1523, Christian II's uncle, Duke Frederick, captured the town and castle, thereby securing his hold on the kingdom.

The struggle for Copenhagen Castle was not yet over, however. During the Count's Feud, the town opened its gates in 1534 to Christian II's supporter Count Christopher of Oldenburg, who established his residence at the castle. In 1535 Christian III began his siege of the town and castle, which, starved to the utmost, was forced to surrender in 1536.

=== Architectural history, 1369–1536 ===
From the time of Eric of Pomerania onward, the castle was gradually expanded, though for a long time it remained within the confines of the old castle wall that had surrounded Absalon's Castle.

The castle's ground plan therefore lay within the circular moat, which had an inner diameter of about 50 metres. Within this space the king resided with his family and court. Outbuildings included a customs house and a guardhouse.

King after king modified the castle with extensions, galleries, stair towers and more. Christian I built and furnished a knight's hall (known as the "Dancing Hall"), which was not completed until King Hans in 1503. Christian II also rebuilt parts of the castle, including an entirely new castle chapel. As part of this, he commissioned an elaborate five-winged late-Gothic altarpiece, made in Antwerp around 1520. This altarpiece was donated in 1728 to the Church of the Black Friars (Sortebrødre Kirke) in Viborg, where it remains today.

== As a royal residence, 1536–1731 ==
=== Christian III's expansion, 1552–1558 ===
The first major expansion was undertaken by Christian III in the 1550s. After the siege of Copenhagen (1535–1536), it was clear the castle was outdated as a fortification. Copenhagen Castle thereafter shifted from being part of Copenhagen's defences to serving purely as a residence. Christian III expanded the castle by building out into the moat. At the same time, a number of buildings were erected outside the moat to house functions that had previously been located within the castle, including administrative buildings, an access bridge, and harbour and shipyard facilities for the navy.

=== Christian IV and Copenhagen Castle ===
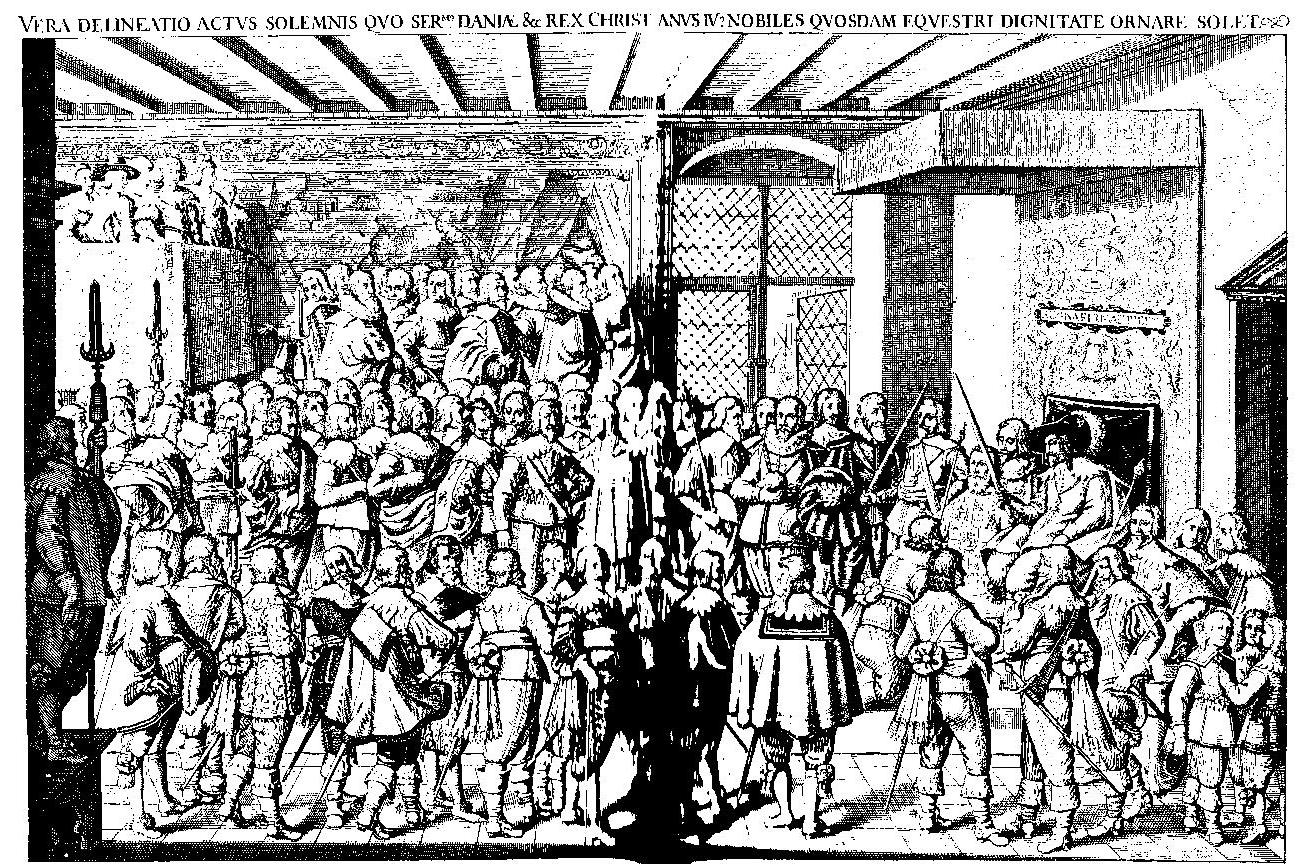
Christian IV holds a ceremonial jousting tournament in the so-called Green Hall of Copenhagen Castle in 1634

When Christian IV was crowned in 1596, he celebrated by raising the great entrance tower, known as the Blue Tower, and topping it with a spire. The Blue Tower became known as a prison, where among others Leonora Christina Ulfeldt was held captive for 21 years. In 1556 an organ was built for the castle's chapel by Hermann Rodensteen, one of the major organ builders of the 16th century. Beyond this, the castle itself was not altered a great deal during this period, but its surroundings were, as larger areas between the islets were filled in. This gave rise to, among other things, Christianshavn, Børsen (the Exchange) and the Tøjhuset (Arsenal), a development that continued under Frederick III, who also built a number of stable buildings and the Royal Library.

Perspective drawing from the time of Frederick IV

=== Frederick IV's rebuilding, 1720–1729 ===
Copenhagen Castle had long been known as the shabbiest princely residence in all of Europe, and was a considerable embarrassment, not only for the royal family and its international reputation but for the Danish people as well.

In the early 18th century the castle was thoroughly renovated by Frederick IV. The moat was filled in and levelled, and the castle's ground plan, with all its corners and extensions, was straightened into a more regular five-sided baroque form. The wings, previously of varying heights, were all raised to five storeys. The Blue Tower remained standing, but was pierced by the new main gate to the castle courtyard, functioning thereafter as a gatehouse.

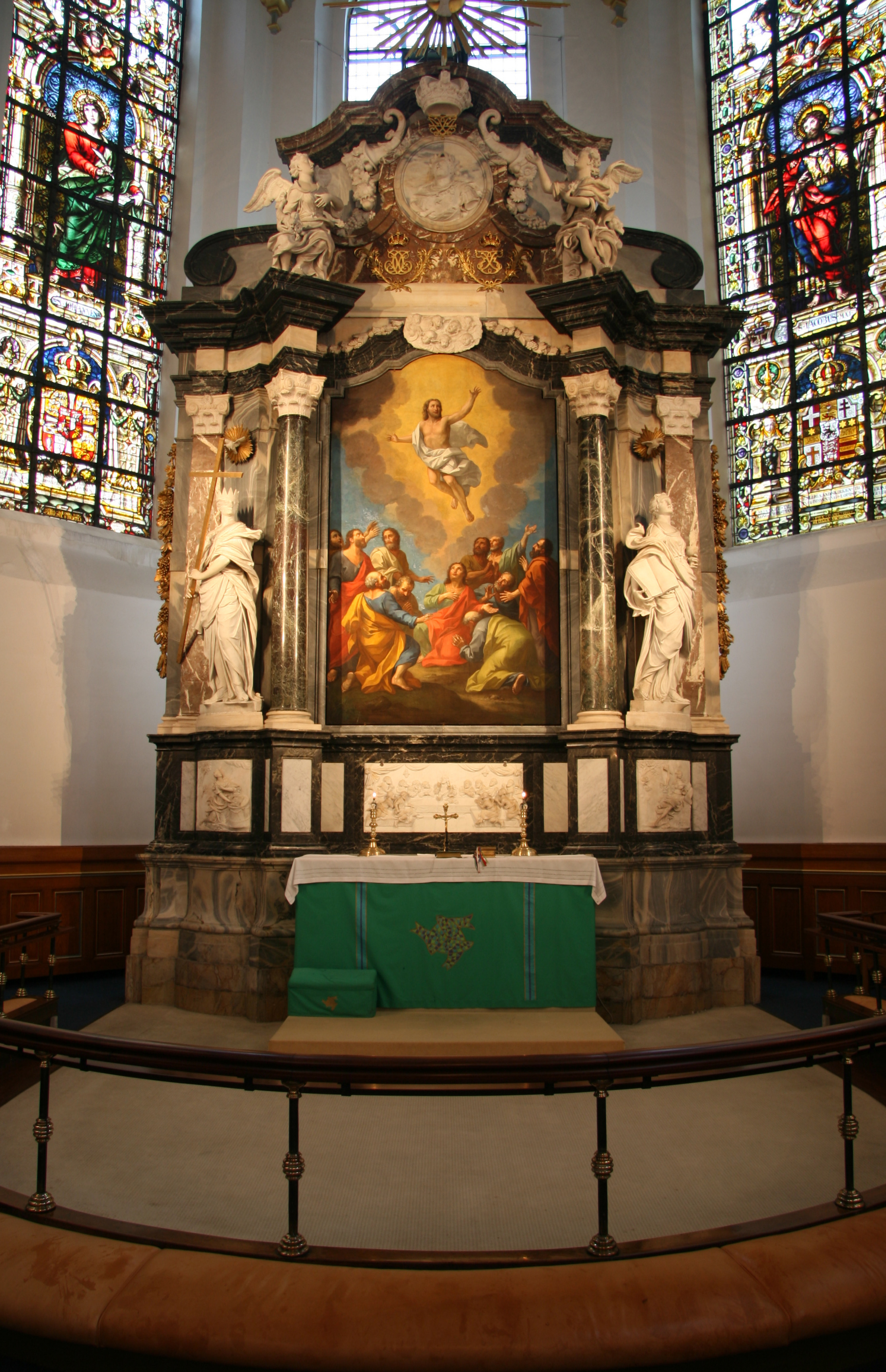
The altarpiece from Frederick IV's castle chapel, in its current location in the Church of the Holy Spirit in Copenhagen

The rebuilt castle stood complete in 1728. But internally, and in the courtyard, it had become even darker and more cramped, and at the same time the castle had grown so heavy that the walls began to give way and crack. Already around 1730, Frederick IV's successor Christian VI decided to demolish it in order to build an entirely new castle: the first Christiansborg Palace. The demolition of the overextended and antiquated Copenhagen Castle began in 1731.

In the early 20th century, the remains of Copenhagen Castle and Absalon's Castle were rediscovered and excavated in connection with the reconstruction of Christiansborg Palace following the fire of 1884. The ruins of Copenhagen Castle can today be seen in the covered excavations beneath the present Christiansborg Palace.

== Other sources ==
- Frydendal, Flemming (red) (2005) Ruinerne under Christiansborg (København: Slots- og Ejendomsstyrelsen) ISBN 87-990389-4-3
- Hvidt, Kristian; Ellehøj, Svend; Norn, Otto (1975) Christiansborg Slot I–II. Udgivet af Folketingets præsidium (København: Nyt Nordisk Forlag Arnold Busck) ISBN 87-1701955-9
- Lund, Hakon, in Bramsen, Bo (ed.) (1987) København, før og nu – og aldrig, vol. 1: Slotsholmen (København: Palle Fogtdal) ISBN 87-7807-720-6

== See also ==
- Absalon's Castle
- Christiansborg Palace
