= Michael Adolph von Althann =

Austrian military commander and diplomat

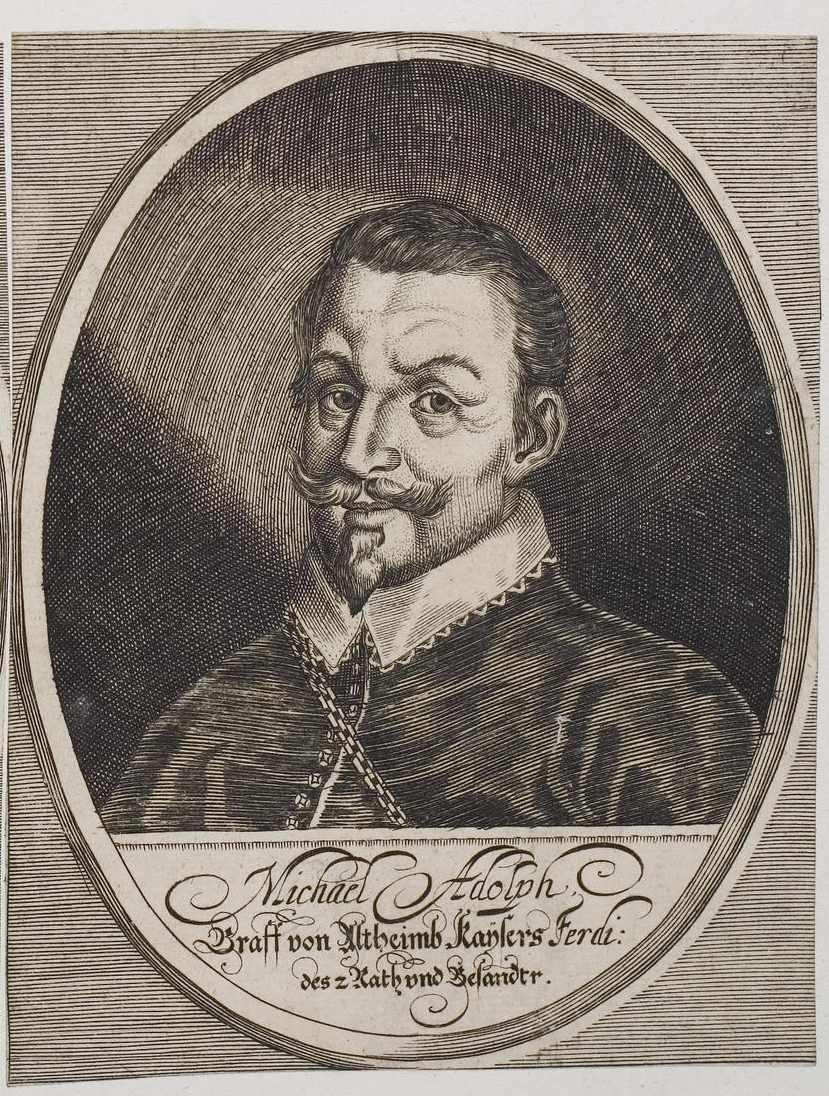
- Engraved portrait published by Dominicus Custos
- Born: 1574
- Died: 7 May 1636 (aged 61–62); Vienna
- Spouse(s): Elisabeth von Stotzingen (1606); Maria Eva von Sternberg (1627)
- Military career
- Allegiance: Holy Roman Empire

Michael Adolf von Althann, alternatively written Altheimb, (1574–1636) was an Austrian military commander and diplomat. He particularly distinguished himself in the Long Turkish War, at Székesfehérvár and Esztergom. At the end of the war he was appointed field marshal. He was appointed governor of Gran in 1606 and on 14 June 1610 he was made an Imperial Count. He was later sent on diplomatic missions to the Principality of Transylvania and the Sublime Porte. In 1625 he became the first grand master of the short-lived order of knighthood Militia Christiana, of which he was a founder. He died in Vienna on 7 May 1636.

== Family ==
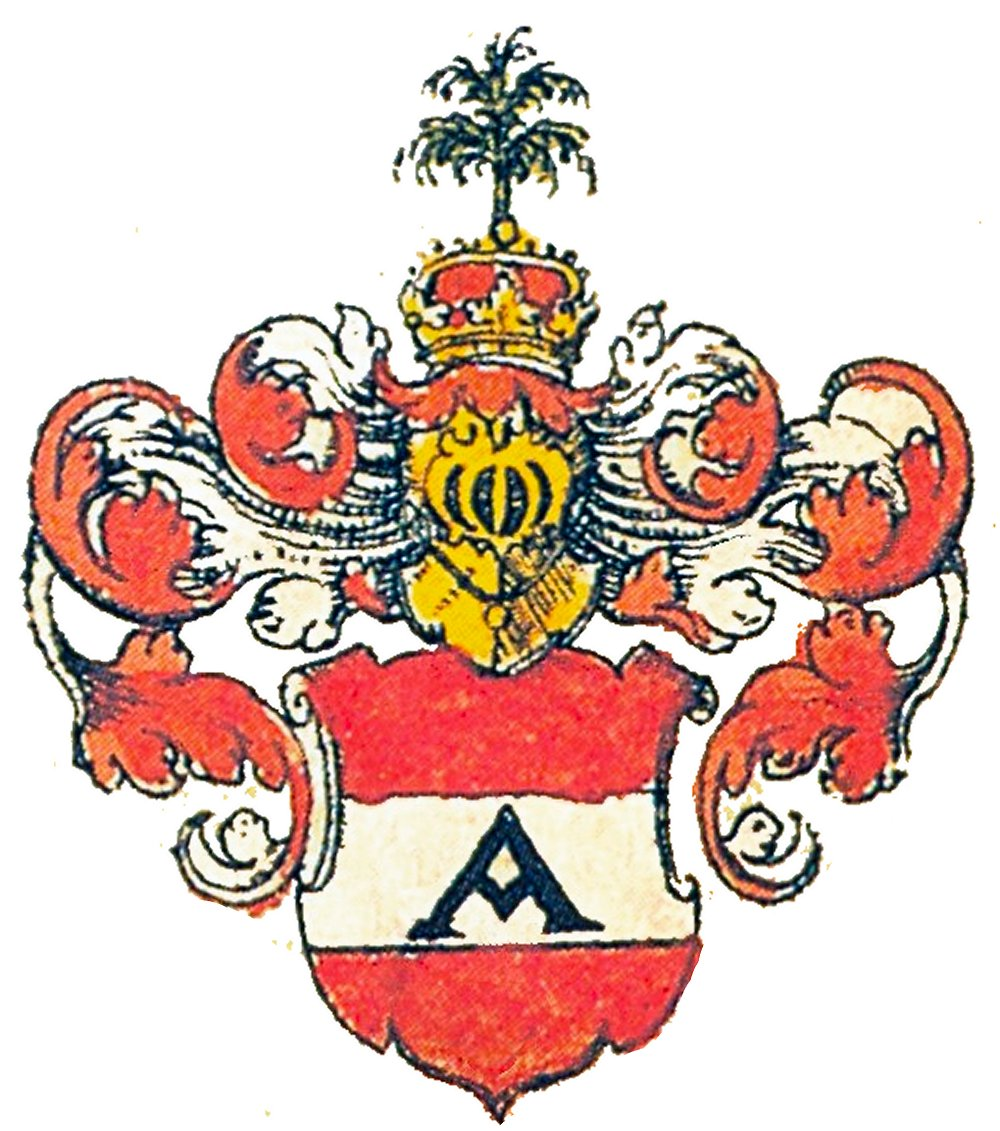

Althann was the son of Christoph Freiherr von Althann auf Goldburg und Murstetten (died Vienna, 1589) and Elisabeth Freiin Teuffel von Gundersdorff.

In 1606 he married Elisabeth von Stotzingen, daughter of the governor of Lower Austria; in 1627 he married Maria Eva von Sternberg.
