= Corfitz Ulfeldt =

Danish statesman (1606–1664)

Count Corfits Ulfeldt
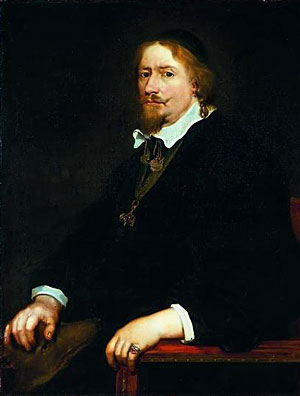
- Corfitz Ulfeldt, painted by Sébastien Bourdon in 1653. Original located on Frederiksborgmuseet, Denmark
- Born: 10 July 1606; Hagenskov Castle, Assens, Denmark
- Died: 20 February 1664 (aged 57) near Basel
- Spouse: Countess Leonora Christina af Slesvig og Holsten (m. 1636)
- Issue: Count Christian Ulfeldt; Countess Anna Katrine Ulfeldt; Count Jakob Ulfeldt; Countess Ellen Ulfeldt; Count Ludwig Ulfeldt; Count Corfitz Ulfeldt; Count Leo Belgicus Ulfeldt; Countess Leonora Sophie Ulfeldt; Count Otto Ulfeldt; Count Leo Ulfeldt
- Father: Jacob Ulfeldt
- Mother: Birgitte Brockenhuus

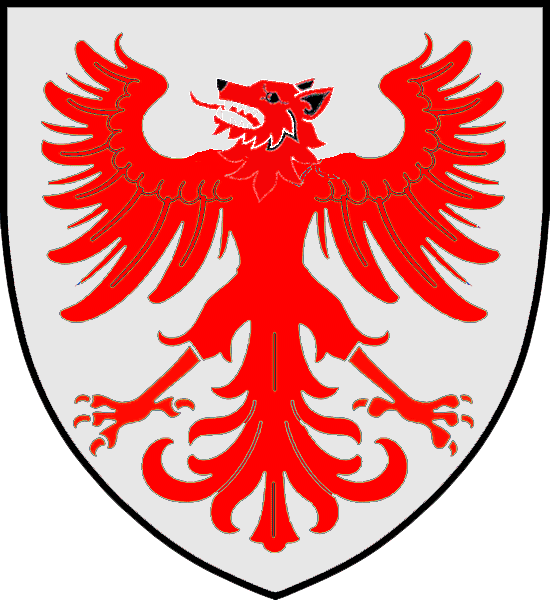
Ulfeldt family Coat of arms

Count Corfits Ulfeldt (10 July 1606 – 20 February 1664) was a Danish statesman known for his collaboration with Sweden during and after the 1657-1658 Dano-Swedish War, for which he is traditionally considered traitorous by the Danish.

== Early life ==
Ulfeldt was the son of the chancellor Jacob Ulfeldt. He was educated abroad, concluding with one year under Cesare Cremonini at Padua. He returned to Denmark in 1629.

== Rise to power ==
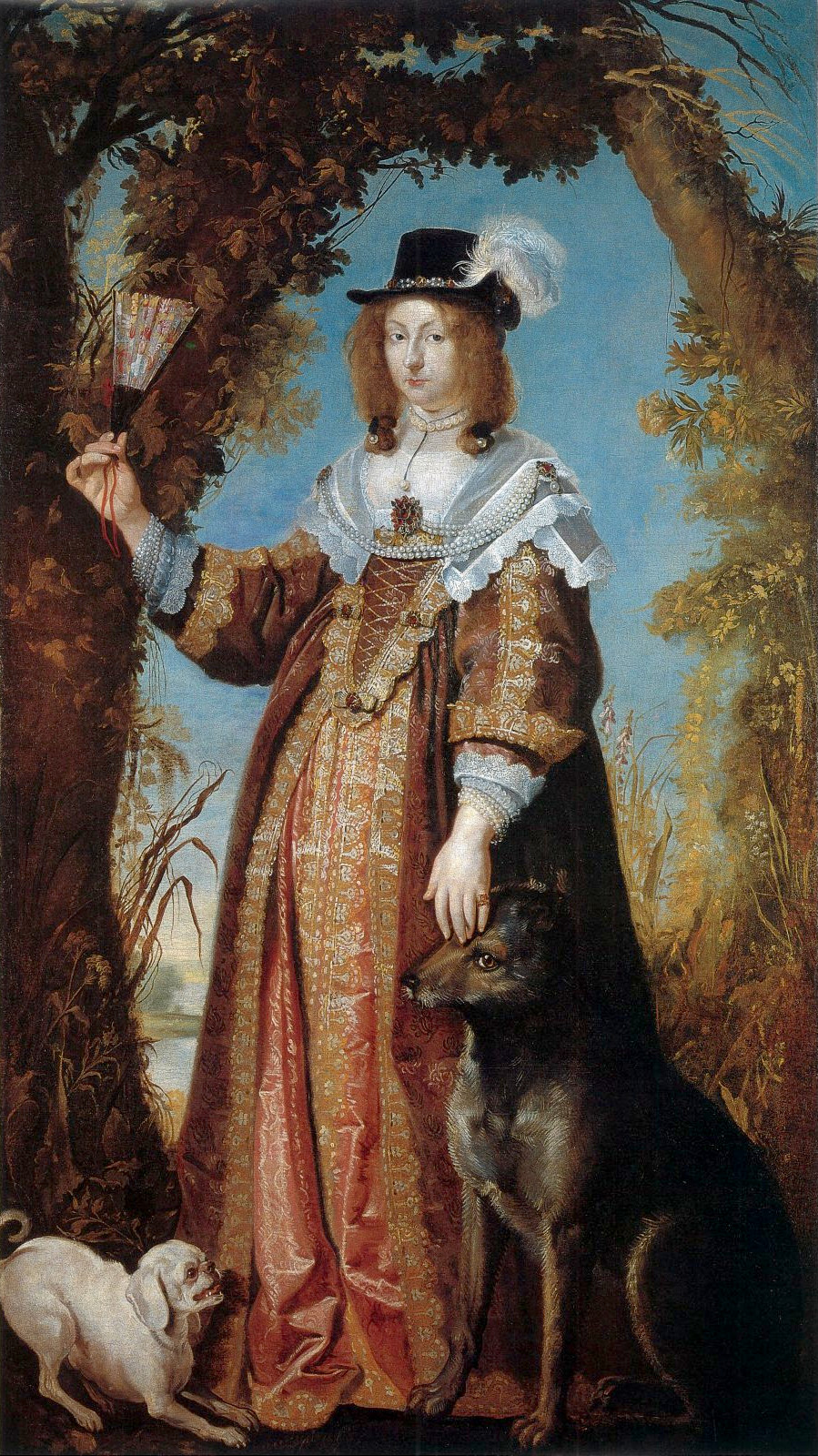
Painting of Leonora Christina by Karel van Mander; Frederiksborg Museum

Upon his return to Denmark, Ulfeldt quickly won the favor of King Christian IV. In 1634 he was made a Knight of the Order of the Elephant, in 1636 became Councillor of State, in 1637 Governor of Copenhagen, and in 1643 Steward of the Realm.

In 1637 Ulfeldt married Countess Leonora Christina (1621–1698) who was the daughter of the King by a morganatic marriage to Kirsten Munk. She had been betrothed to Ulfeldt since her ninth year. Ulfeldt was the most striking personality at the Danish court in all superficial accomplishments, but his character was marked by ambition, avarice and absolute lack of honor or conscience. He was largely responsible for the disasters of the Swedish war of 1643-45, and when the Treaty of Brömsebro was signed there was a violent scene between him and the King, though Ulfeldt's resignation was not accepted.

In December 1646 he was sent as ambassador extraordinary to the Hague, but the results of his embassy were disappointing and when he returned to Denmark in July 1647 he found the king dissatisfied. Ulfeldt, supported by the Rigsråd and the nobility, who objected to Christian's fiscal policy, resisted his father-in-law, and triumphed completely. As Steward of the Realm he was the virtual ruler of Denmark during the two months which elapsed between the death of Christian IV and the election of Frederick III (6 July 1648); but the new king was resisted the attempts at domination by Ulfeldt and his wife. This antagonism was further complicated by allegations of a plot (ultimately proven to be false, but believed at the time to be true) on the part of Dina Vinhofvers, a former mistress of Ulfeldt, to poison the royal family. Dina was convicted of perjury and executed but, feeling vulnerable in Copenhagen Ulfeldt fled Denmark with his family in secret on the day after the execution (14 July 1651).

== Treason ==
After living for a time in concealment at Amsterdam, Ulfeldt moved to Stralsund in Swedish Pomerania. In the Dano-Swedish War of 1657 and 1658, King Charles X Gustav of Sweden invaded Denmark, Sweden's deadliest foe at the time. In July 1657, Ulfeldt responded to the King's invitation to enter his service. During Charles X's march across the Belts, Ulfeldt persuaded the commandant of Nakskov (a strategically crucial fortress) to surrender to the Swedish king's forces, and did his best to convince his countrymen that resistance was useless. He loaned the Swedish king a fortune to finance the war with money that, it is believed, was embezzled from the Danish state. Finally, as one of the Swedish negotiators at the Treaty of Taastrup, he was instrumental in assuring the humiliation of his native land.

Ulfeldt's treason was rewarded by Charles X of Sweden with ennoblement as the Count of Sölvesborg in Blekinge; however a discontented Ulfeldt instead began intriguing against his new master. He was soon discovered, and in May 1659 was sentenced to death. On 7 July the Swedish regents amnestied him, and he returned to Copenhagen to try to make his peace with his lawful sovereign, who promptly imprisoned him and his wife. In the summer of 1660 they were conveyed to Hammershus in Bornholm, as prisoners of state.

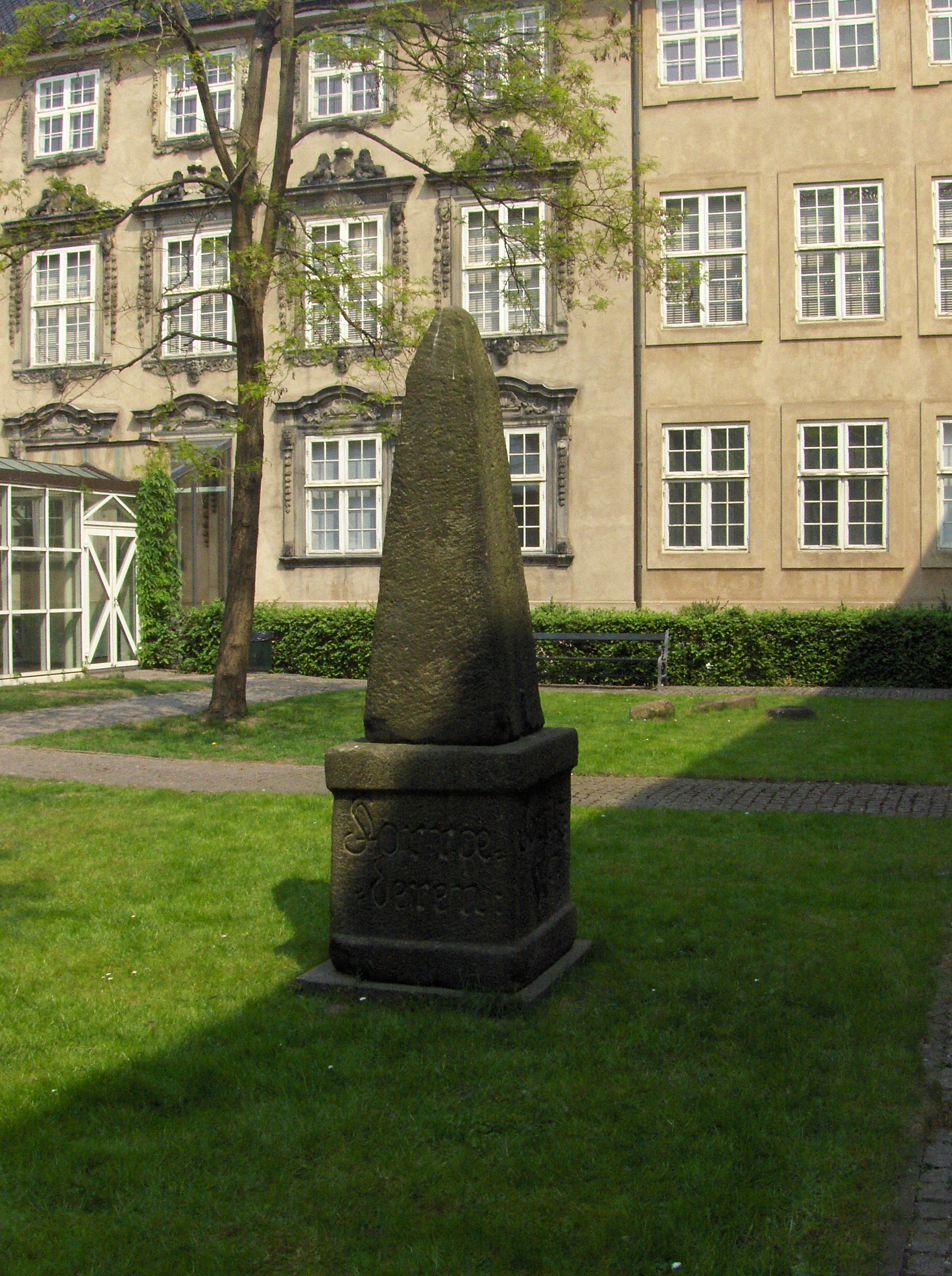
Corfitz Ulfeldt's pillory, now in the National Museum of Denmark

After a debilitating captivity the couple were released in September 1661 and Ulfeldt continued to scheme against the kind. In the course of 1662, during his residence at Bruges, he offered the Danish-Norwegian crown to Frederick William I, Elector of Brandenburg, proposing to raise a rebellion in Denmark for that purpose. Frederick William betrayed Ulfeldt's treason to Frederick III, and the Danish government at once impeached the traitor. On 24 July 1663, he and his children were degraded, his property was confiscated, and he was condemned to be beheaded and quartered.

He escaped from the country, but the sentence was carried out on his effigy and a pillory was erected on the ruins of his mansion at Copenhagen. During a new flight, he died in February 1664 in a boat on the Rhine not far from Basel. The circumstances of his death and his final resting place are not known.

== Legacy ==
To posterity Corfits Ulfeldt has stood as the prototype of a traitor in Danish history. Modern historians have tended to view him as a highly mentally unstable man whose lust for power ended in megalomania and insanity.

In contrast, his wife Leonora Christina has been admired because of her long time as a prisoner after his death. She spent twenty-one years in confinement in the royal dungeon, Blåtårn, prior to her release during 1685. Jammers Minde is an autobiography completed in 1674 by Leonora Christina. It was first published in 1869 and translated into English as Memoirs of Leonora Christina.

== Other sources ==
- Steffen Heiberg (1993) Enhjørningen Corfitz Ulfeldt (Copenhagen: Gyldendal) ISBN 87-00-54936-3

== Related reading ==
- Leonora Christina Ulfeldt (1872). Memoirs of Leonora Christina: Daughter of Christian IV. of Denmark; Written During Her Imprisonment In the Blue Tower At Copenhagen 1663-1685. Library of Alexandria. ISBN 978-1-4655-1373-1.
- Leonora Christina (2010). Jammers Minde (in Danish). Gyldendal A/S. ISBN 978-87-02-07970-8.
