= Blåtårn =

Destroyed tower in Copenhagen Castle, Denmark

Coordinates: 55.6765°N 12.5807°E

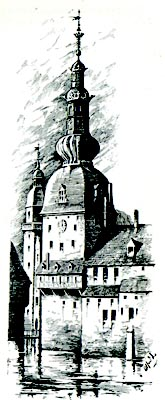
Blåtårn

Blåtårn (in English: Blue Tower) was a tower in Copenhagen Castle, the Danish royal family's palace in Copenhagen, Denmark. The tower was used as a dungeon and has been known as such in history. It is not known when the tower was built, but it is known to have existed during the reign of King John I of Denmark (reign 1481–1513). It existed from at least the late 15th century until destroyed in 1731–32.

== History ==
Many famous people were imprisoned in Blåtårn during its history. In the 1520s, a large number of Swedish prisoners were taken there after the Swedish rebellion against the Kalmar Union and the subsequent declaration of Swedish independence, notably the renowned heroine Christina Gyllenstierna and female members of the House of Vasa, Sweden's ruling dynasty. In the chronicle of the son of Margareta Eriksdotter Vasa, Per Brahe the Elder (who was with her during the captivity) the captivity of the Swedish noblewomen in Denmark were described: "They were much deprived of food and drink [...]. Hardly given enough each day to keep their lives but they worked to be fed":

King Gustav I of Sweden used their treatment in captivity in his propaganda against Christian II and claimed that the Danish monarch starved the women and children who only survived by the mercy showed them by the queen of Denmark, Isabella of Austria. Whatever the truth of this, it is confirmed that many of the imprisoned women and children died, among them Margareta's mother Cecilia, sister Emerentia and cousin Magdalena, though the cause of death are given as the plague, at that point used to classify a number of different illnesses.

Perhaps its best known prisoner was Leonora Christina Ulfeldt (a daughter of Christian IV of Denmark and wife of the Danish statesman Corfitz Ulfeldt), who was imprisoned here at the behest of the Queen-Mother, Sophia of Brunswick, between 1663 and 1685, during which she wrote several works, including her famous autobiography Jammers Minde.

== Other prisons of the same name ==
After 1732, the same name was also used for a jail in Copenhagen near Frederiksholm channel; that building was torn down in 1848.

A tower of Sønderborg Castle, where the deposed king Christian II of Denmark was imprisoned, has also been known by this name, but was demolished in 1755.

== Famous prisoners of Blåtårn ==
- Margareta Eriksdotter (Vasa), sister of King Gustav I of Sweden.
- Cecilia Månsdotter, mother of King Gustav I of Sweden.
- Sigrid Eskilsdotter (Banér), grandmother of King Gustav I of Sweden.
- Märta Eriksdotter (Vasa), sister of King Gustav I of Sweden.
- Emerentia Eriksdotter (Vasa), sister of King Gustav I of Sweden.
- Christina Gyllenstierna, Swedish noble and the defender of Stockholm
- Torben Oxe, Danish noble and governor of Copenhagen Castle
- Knud Pedersen Gyldenstjerne, Danish Councillor of State
- Joachim Rønnov, Bishop of Diocese of Roskilde
- Leonora Christina Ulfeldt, daughter of King Christian IV of Denmark
