= Johann Franz von Gronsfeld =

Johann Franz Graf von Gronsfeld-Bronckhorst (1640 – 8 April 1719) was an Imperial military officer, President of the Imperial War Council and Field Marshal during the Bavarian uprising of 1705–1706.

== Career ==
As early as 1665 or earlier, on a journey from Mainz to Frankfurt, Gronsfeld allegedly suggested the polyalphabetic encryption method named after him to the writer and Jesuit priest Gaspar Schott.

Gronsfeld was a Swabian general constable in 1689. On 5 June 1688, he was promoted to general field sergeant in the Habsburg Army and on 10 July 1692 to field marshal lieutenant. He was promoted to General of Cavalry on 15 September 1692 and finally to Imperial field marshal on 1 August 1704.

On 15 May 1705, Gronsfeld approached the city of Munich with 8,000 men and siege guns and demanded its immediate surrender under threat of bombardment. The citizens were ready to defend themselves and made initial preparations to do so, but the armed forces in the city were already outnumbered by the attackers. Von Gronsfeld negotiated twice with the government and the city council of Munich. Only after Gronsfeld had given written assurance that the sons of Elector Maximilian II Emanuel's sons and that the citizens would retain their privileges, and after it was promised that the burden of the quarters would be borne equally by the citizens, court servants, nobility and clergy, the citizens calmed down and agreed to the handover.

On 16 May 1705, the town was handed over to the Imperial troops. Gronsfeld marched into Munich with 2,816 soldiers. Divergences between the Imperial administration in Bavaria and the military command led to Gronsfeld being dismissed, following a letter of complaint to Emperor Joseph I on 6 June 1705. His successor was General Count Scipioni Bagni.

== Personal life ==
He was the son of Jost Maximilian von Bronckhorst-Gronsfeld and Anna Christina von Hardenrath.

He was married to Eleonora Philippine Katharine von Fürstenberg since 1677. The marriage remained childless. His second marriage was to Anna von Törring-Ilchenbach. The couple had a daughter who died young.

After the count's death, the earldom passed to his widow, who married Count Claudius Nikolaus von Arberg und Valengin. The next heiress was their daughter Maria Josepha. She married Count Max Emanuel von Toerring-Jettenbach. The marriage remained childless. The Törring family lost the county with the German mediatisation of 1803 and received the Imperial Gutenzell Abbey in return.

== Bibliography ==
- Henric L. Wuermeling: 1705. Der bayerische Volksaufstand und die Sendlinger Mordweihnacht. Mit einem Prolog von Winston S. Churchill. 4., durchgesehene Auflage. LangenMüller, München 2005, ISBN 3-7844-3007-4.
