= Leonora Christina Ulfeldt =

Danish noble and writer (1621–1698)

- Countess of Schleswig-Holstein
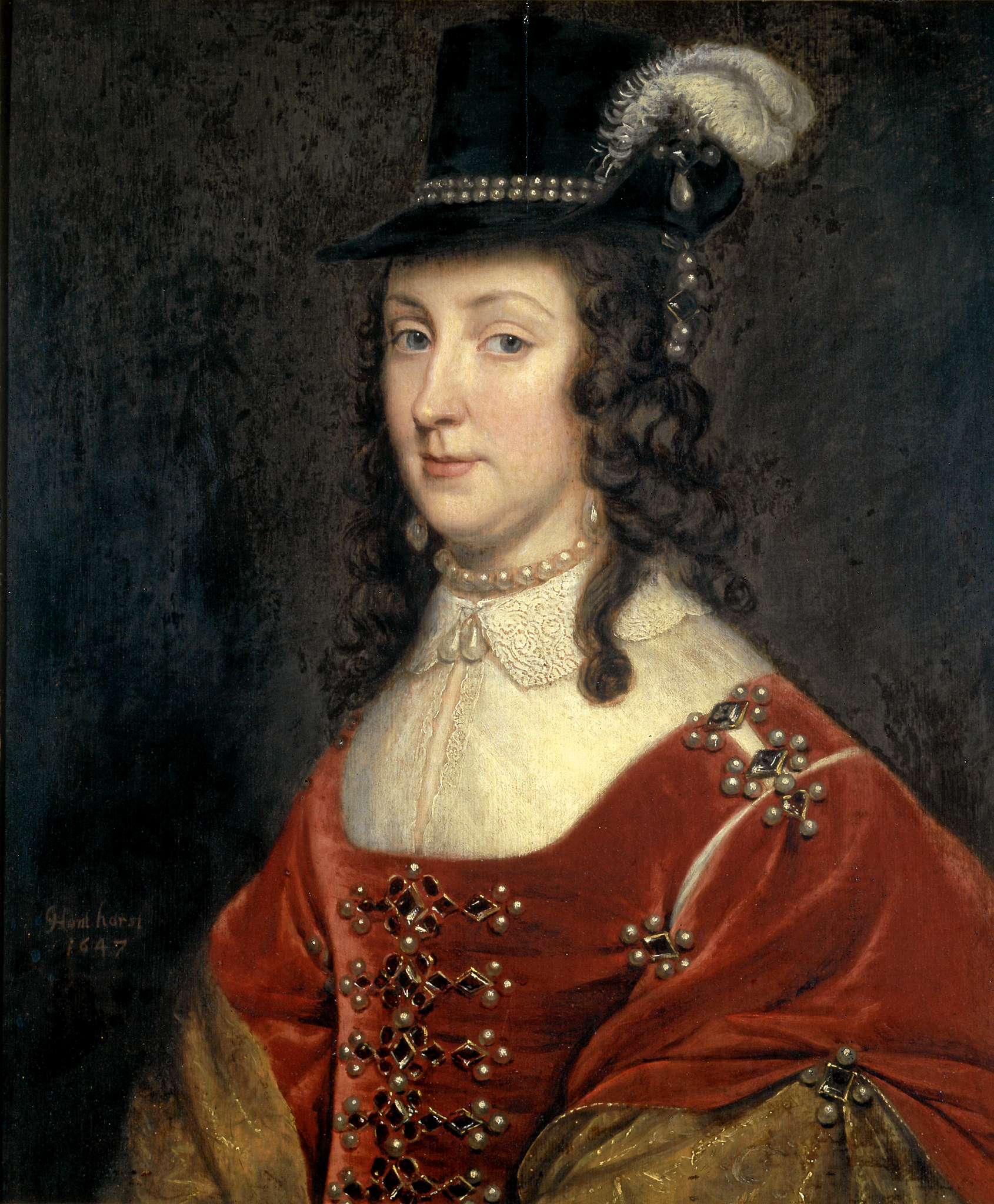
- Portrait of Leonora Christina Ulfeldt by Gerrit van Honthorst (1647). Frederiksborg Museum.
- Born: 8 July 1621
- Died: 16 March 1698 (aged 76)
- Spouse: Corfitz Ulfeldt (m. 1636; died 1664)
- Issue Detail: 10
- Father: Christian IV of Denmark
- Mother: Kirsten Munk

Leonora Christina, Countess Ulfeldt, born "Countess Leonora Christina Christiansdatter" til Slesvig og Holsten (8 July 1621 – 16 March 1698), was daughter to King Christian IV of Denmark and Kirsten Munk and wife of the Steward of the Realm, the traitor Count Corfitz Ulfeldt. Renowned in Denmark since the 19th century for her posthumously published autobiography Jammers Minde, written secretly during two decades of solitary confinement in a royal dungeon, her intimate version of the major events she witnessed in Europe's history, interwoven with ruminations on her woes as a political prisoner, still commands popular interest and scholarly respect, and has virtually become the stuff of legend as retold and enlivened in Danish literature and art.

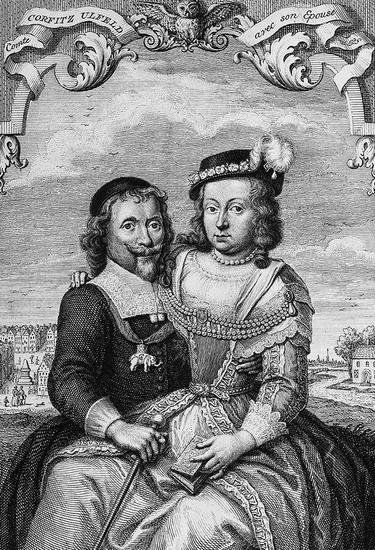
Portrait of Leonora Christina Ulfeldt and her husband Corfitz by Jacob Folkema (c. 1746).

== Birth and family ==
Christian IV is believed to have fathered fifteen children by his second wife, Kirsten Munk, at least three of whom were born before the couple married in 1615, and eight of whom lived to adulthood. The Munks were noble courtiers, and Kirsten's formidable mother, née Ellen Marsvin, obtained the King's signed promise to marry the girl before yielding her to the King's passion. The marriage was morganatic and Leonora Christina was not a princess, sharing rather the title of Countess af Schleswig-Holstein bestowed upon her mother in 1629 (distinct from the title borne by the Dukes of Schleswig-Holstein, dynastic kinsmen of the Danish kings who possessed actual domains in the Schleswig and Holstein provinces, some of whom also exercised sovereignty there).

Nonetheless, she grew up with her parents in Copenhagen's royal palace (across the courtyard from the tower where she would eventually be imprisoned) on familiar terms with her three elder half-brothers – including the future King Frederick III – sons of the late Queen Anne Catherine of Brandenburg. She was raised under the supervision of the royal governess Karen Sehested. The King accused his wife of betraying him with another man and divorced her in 1630, having already taken a mistress, Vibeke Kruse, his wife's servant. Although Vibeke Kruse proceeded to bear the King a new brood of children who would become the bitter rivals of Kirsten Munk's children, Leonora Christina seems to have retained her father's favor.

Leonora Christina's marriage was part of Christian IV's strategy to consolidate his dynasty's power. Since 1448 the House of Oldenburg had been Denmark's ruling dynasty, father-to-son. Although hereditary monarchs de facto, until 1660 each successor became king de jure only through election by the Rigsråd. Upon the death of a king, that body would negotiate fresh limitations upon the royal authority, only ratifying the nominee's accession to the throne in return for concessions of rights and privileges. Tradition upheld the King's impartiality and dignity among the nobility by not permitting members of the royal family to marry his subjects, reserving princesses for foreign alliances. But the morganatic status of Leonora Christina and her sisters rendered them useful domestic tools of state, so Christian IV sought to bind the loyalty of powerful or promising nobles by bestowing upon them the hands of these semi-royal daughters, endowed with rich dowries. Six such marriages were arranged. Thus in 1636 the fifteen-year-old Leonora Christina was married to the thirty-year-old Corfitz Ulfeldt, son of the late Chancellor Jacob Ulfeldt, to whom she had been engaged since the age of nine. Though the marriage failed to ensure Ulfeldt's loyalty to the Crown, the young Countess would remain loyal to her husband even beyond his death, accompanying or following him on his every misadventure, and refusing to speak posthumous ill of him even to purchase her freedom.

== Travels and adventures ==
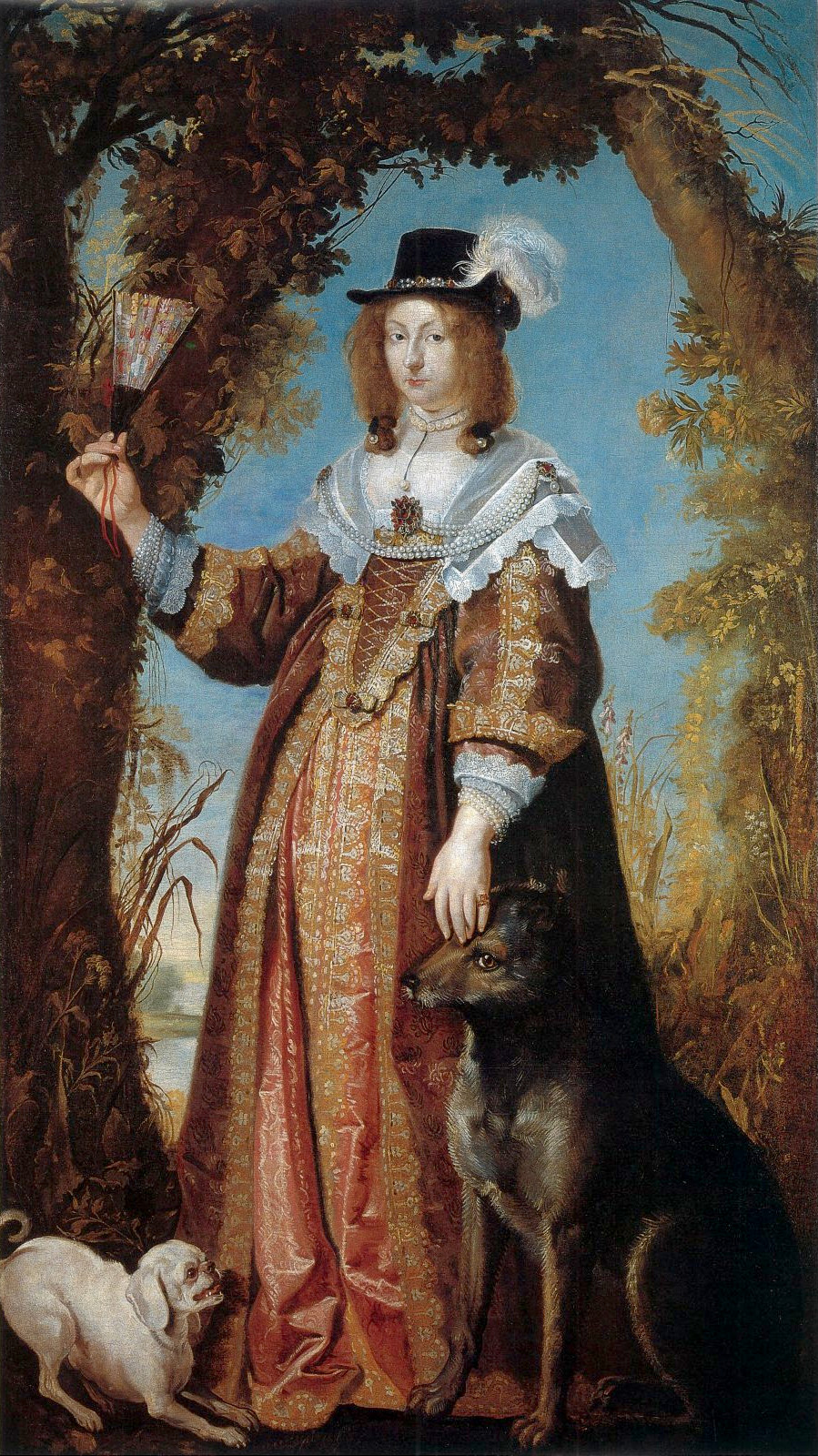
Painting by Karel van Mander; Frederiksborg Museum

She and Ulfeldt shared in his renown and initial successes, both at home and abroad. He held the lordships of Egeskov, Hirschholm Urup, Gradlitz and Hermanitz. In 1641 he was made a count (Reichsgraf) by the Holy Roman Emperor Ferdinand III. During most of the 1640s her husband's power and stature grew and she was, in many ways, the first lady of a Danish court that had no queen. Her marriage to Ulfeldt seems to have been a happy one, at least compared to the marriages of her sisters.

At the accession to the throne of her half-brother in 1648, the couple's position was threatened by the resentment of her husband's dominance by Frederick III and, especially, by his queen, Sophie Amalie of Brunswick-Lüneburg, who now became Leonora Christina's relentless enemy. This situation might have been caused both by Leonora's inability to give up her leading position in the court, and by some forms of malice to which she exposed the queen.

At Ulfeldt's disgrace in 1651 (he was rumoured to have been associated with a plot to poison the royal family), she followed him to Amsterdam and Stockholm. They became fugitives, often wandering about to elude capture. She sometimes spent weeks disguised as a man, once fending off arrest from Danish pursuers at gunpoint, and another time the caresses of an infatuated barmaid, the latter proving the more difficult escape. At her insistence, she shared Ulfeldt's exile and expeditions, while he engaged in intrigues with Denmark's enemies for some years, hoping either to return to Copenhagen in power or to humiliate those who held power there. Despite having been made Count of Sölvesborg in Sweden for treasonous services, he was discovered engaged in double treachery and, in 1659, imprisoned. His wife publicly defended him. They escaped separately to Copenhagen where he was promptly arrested, and she shared his harsh imprisonment in the castle Hammershus on the isle of Bornholm 1660–1661, until they ransomed themselves by deeding over most of their properties.

When Ulfeldt was again being sought for treason by the Danes, Leonora Christina went to England to solicit repayment from King Charles II of money her husband had loaned him during his exile. The King repaid his debt by welcoming the Countess (his cousin) to his table, then having her arrested as she boarded a ship to leave England, whereupon he turned her over to Denmark in 1663.

== Imprisonment ==
She was taken to a holding cell, and thrice cross-examined by court officials, but refused to attest to any crimes on her husband's part, or to join her signature to his abandoning their family's lands in return for her freedom. Finally she consented to the forfeiture upon the promise that Ulfeldt would be set free. But she was betrayed, he was condemned and a writ was issued for his execution and the exile of their children. Once again he escaped, and joined his children abroad, although she was not at first told this and was compelled to watch as he was burned in effigy. She was never to see her husband again, and there is no evidence that he sought her freedom or reunion with her prior to his death.

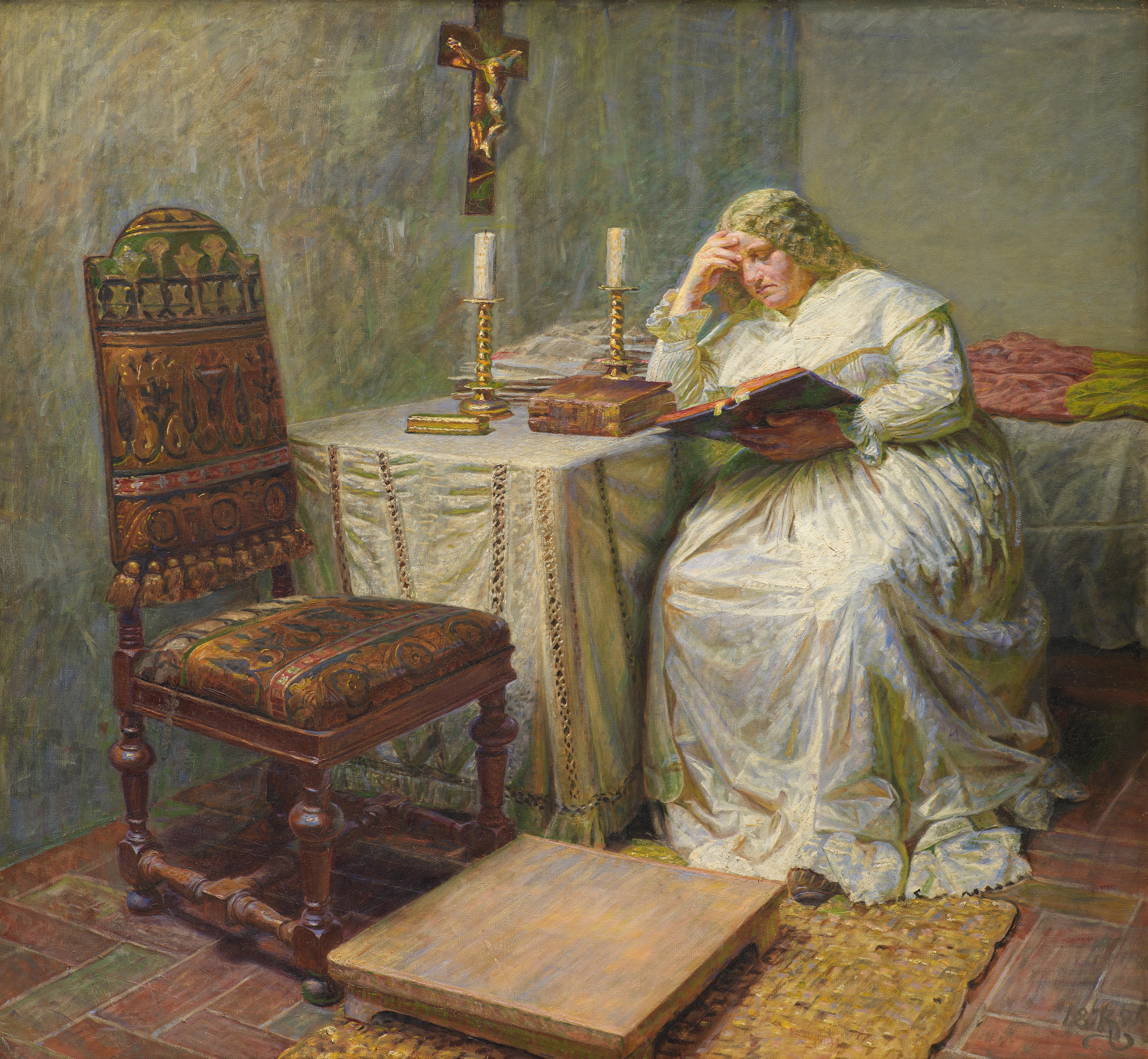
Leonora Christina in Blåtårn by Kristian Zahrtmann, 1891

For the next twenty-two years she remained in the custody of the Danish state, incarcerated without charge or trial in Copenhagen Castle's infamous Blue Tower (Danish, Blåtårn). She lived under meagre and humiliating conditions for the daughter of a king, and was for years deprived of almost all comforts. During these years she perforce showed great stoicism and ingenuity. She wrote that her cell was small, filthy, foul, infested with fleas, and that the rats were so numerous and hungry that they ate her night candle as it burned. She learned to piece together pages for writing from the wrappers on the sugar that she was given, and to make ink for her fowl's quill by capturing the candle's smoke on a spoon. Slowly she adjusted to her plight, ceased longing for revenge or death, and developed a mordant humor. She studied the vermin who were her only companions, recording her observations and conjectures about their instincts. When she heard that her husband had died abroad, she marvelled that she felt only relief that he had finally eluded his persecutors.

The few human interactions she was permitted were equally humiliating, when not dangerous. The tower warden was wont to visit her at night when he was drunk, and she was saved from his advances on one occasion only because he slumbered off in mid-embrace. Maid servants were sent to clean her cell and watch her from an outer room, sending reports on her words and pastimes to the Queen. But such women as worked in prisons were apt to be hard and insolent. Leonora Christina fended off harassment from one serving wench only by threatening to kill her with her bare hands.

She only received less harsh treatment and more amenities following the death of Frederick III early in 1670. The new king, Christian V, sent his ministers to solicit his mother's consent to free the prisoner. But, if Leonora Christina's account is to be believed, the Queen Dowager rejected their entreaties with rebuke.

When a group of ladies of rank visited her incognito for their amusement one evening, she immediately recognized one of them as "Lady Augusta of Glucksburg", who had been wed in Copenhagen in June 1651 to her cousin Ernest Günther, Duke of Schleswig-Holstein-Sonderburg-Augustenburg). She deduced that the others were her nephew's Queen, Charlotte Amalie of Hesse-Kassel (or Hesse-Cassel), and his sister Anne Sophie, wife of the Electoral Prince Johan Georg of Saxony. They shed tears of pity once they saw her plight (except Augusta, whom Leonora Christina believed later reported the interview to the Queen Dowager). The Queen's mother, the Landgravine Hedwig of Hesse-Kassel, also paid her a clandestine visit while sojourning from Germany, and wagered with the King for the captive's liberation if the Queen's firstborn child was a son. But when the King's mother arrived for the prince's christening, she threatened to leave the court immediately unless Frederick reneged on his promise. The dowagers quarreled over the matter before the King, but the Blue Tower's gates remained shut.

Eventually the King had Leonora Christina moved to more spacious quarters in the tower, installed a stove against the cold of Copenhagen winters, and commanded that her window be opened. The Queen loaned her silk worms, which Leonora Christina eventually returned in a casket on which were embroidered in silk a plea that "Leonora's bonds be loosed". She was now allowed pen and paper, and received a gift from her nephew of two hundred rigsdalers, most of which would be spent on foreign books. It was at this time that she began to write in earnest, intending that her children might one day read her words.

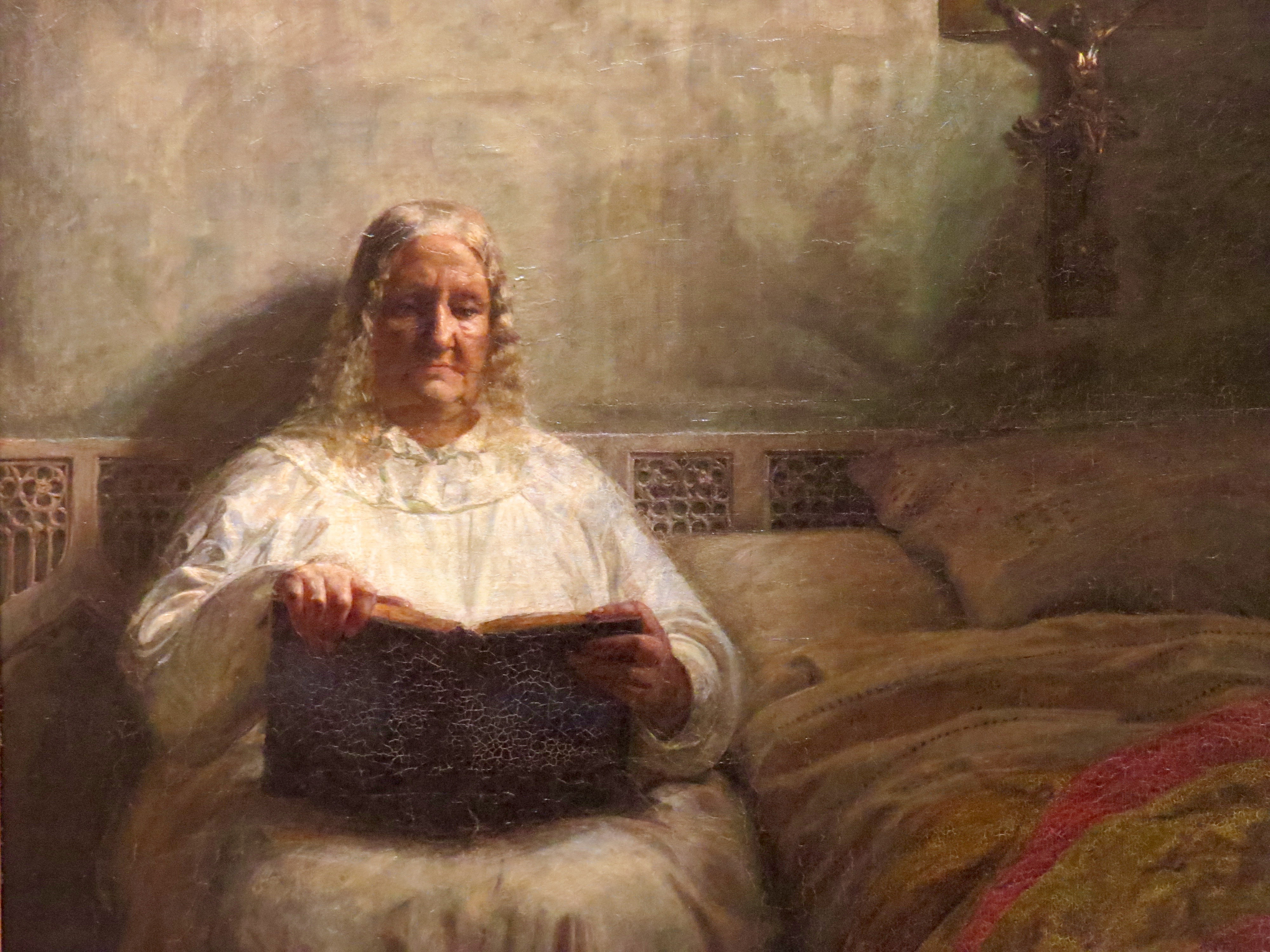
Leonora Christine in Maribo Abbey by Kristian Zahrtmann, 1882

Queen Dowager Sophie Amalie died in February 1685. On the morning of 19 May 1685 Leonora Christina was informed that a royal order had been issued by Chancellor Frederick von Ahlfeldt (he who had reluctantly escorted her into the Tower) for her release. But she refused the guard's offer to unlock her cell until, at 10 o'clock that night, denied a final private audience with the Queen and fetched by Sophie Amalie Lindenov, the daughter of her long-dead sister Elisabeth Augusta Lindenov, the destitute Countess left the Blue Tower forever under cover of darkness and a veil, denying even a glimpse of her face to the curious crowd that had gathered in the courtyard (the Queen and her ladies watched from the palace balcony). For them Leonora Christina had already entered into legend — a royal adventuress who had been first regaled then held captive by the kings of England, Sweden and Denmark. She was sixty-three years old, and had spent twenty-one years, nine months and eleven days in the Tower. She lived her last years quietly on the grounds of Maribo Abbey on the island of Lolland where she occupied her time editing her prison notebooks.

== Literary contribution ==
During her imprisonment and for the twelve years she lived afterwards, she composed the book that made her famous, Jammers Minde (literally, "A Memory of Lament"), which was, however, only published in 1869. Now regarded as a classic of 17th century Danish literature, it explores her prison years in detailed and vivid prose, recounting her crises, confrontations, humiliations, self-discipline, growing religious faith and serenity, together with descriptions of hardships she endured or overcame.

She also wrote in French an account of her happy youth, La Lettre à Otto Sperling (Letter to Otto Sperling), completed in 1673 and smuggled out of the Tower. Seeking the inspiration to endure her ordeal, she had sought out and translated tales of women in adversity. Heltinders Pryd (Praise of Heroines), was penned in 1683 as a compilation of biographical sketches describing the different kinds of courage and endurance summoned by women whose struggles left an imprint on history. In the process she became something of a proto-feminist from the perspective of some later literary and political critics.

Leonora Christina's fate, and especially her memoir, have made her a national cultural heroine in Scandinavia. She has sometimes been portrayed as of saintly stature, both poets and prelates hailing her as the ideal Danish woman: loyal, patient, resolute, and resourceful. Kristian Zahrtmann (1843–1917) has memorialized her story in a series of 18 monumental paintings, the first of which was shown in 1871. These were published as illustrations to her book in an 1890 edition, and released as individual prints in a 1907 edition.

== Children and descendants ==
Leonora Christina and her husband Corfitz Ulfeldt had ten children:

- Christian Ulfeldt (5 December 1637 – 29 July 1688)
- Anna Katrine Ulfeldt (18 March 1639 – 27 May 1707), wife of the Flemish noble Vigilius de Cassette
- Jakob (1640–1642)
- Ellen Ulfeldt (October 1643 – 11 December 1677), unmarried
- Ludwig (1644–1668)
- Corfitz Ulfeldt (1645 – 8 August 1688)
- Leo Belgicus (born October 1646, buried 16 March 1651)
- Leonora Sophie Ulfeldt (1647 – 15 August 1698), wife of the noble Lave Beck
- Otto (1648–1651)
- Leo Ulfeldt (22 March 1651 – 11 April 1716), Austrian field marshal (Feldmarschall)

Through her youngest son, Austrian field marshal and Count Leo Ulfeldt (1651–1716), her descendants not only include some of the most influential German and Slavic noble families of Europe, but also: King Simeon II of the Bulgarians (born 1937), King Michael of Romania (1921–2017), Prince Hans Adam II of Liechtenstein (born 1945), Emperor Karl I of Austria-Hungary (1887–1922), King Peter II of Yugoslavia (1923–1970), King Manuel II of Portugal (1889–1932), King Frederick Augustus III of Saxony (1865–1932), Marie Christine, Princess Michael of Kent, (born 1945), Christoph, Cardinal von Schönborn (born 1945), Maximilian, Duke of Hohenberg (1902–1962), Johannes, Prince of Thurn and Taxis (1926–1990), Prince Aimone, Duke of Apulia (born 1967) and the Earls of Clanwilliam.

Also notable among her descendants was Isabelle, comtesse de Paris (1911–2003), whose life, aside from imprisonment, resembled Leonora Christina's in several respects: Daughter of a morganatic union, she lived in exile with and remained staunchly faithful to a faithless husband, signed away valuable property for his sake, wrote biographies of historically significant women, and penned a memoir (Tout m'est Bonheur, 1978) that celebrated life's blessings in the face of life's travails.

== Ancestry ==
Ancestors of Leonora Christina Ulfeldt

16. Frederick I of Denmark
8. Christian III of Denmark
17. Anna of Brandenburg
4. Frederick II of Denmark
18. Magnus I, Duke of Saxe-Lauenburg
9. Dorothea of Saxe-Lauenburg
19. Catherine of Brunswick-Wolfenbüttel
2. Christian IV of Denmark
20. Albrecht VII, Duke of Mecklenburg
10. Ulrich, Duke of Mecklenburg
21. Anna of Brandenburg
5. Sophie of Mecklenburg-Güstrow
22. Frederick I of Denmark
11. Elizabeth of Denmark
23. Sophie of Pomerania
1. Leonora Christina Ulfeldt
24. Mogens Olufsen Munk
12. Ludvik Mogensen Munk
25. Karen Ludvigsdatter Rosenkrantz
6. Ludvig Ludviksen Munk
26. Peder Hansen Lykke
13. Kirsten Pedersdatter Lykke
27. Kirsten Pedersdatter Høg; or Karen Pedersdatter Reventlow
3. Kirsten Munk
28. Peder Jørgensen Marsvin
14. Jørgen Pedersen Marsvin
29. Helle Tagesdatter Hollunger
7. Ellen Jørgensdatter Marsvin
30. Otte Henriksson Gyldenstierne
15. Karen Ottesdatter Gyldenstierne
31. Helvig Mogensdatter Gøye

== In popular culture ==
Leonora Christina Ulfeldt was the subject of composer Andy Pape and librettist Erik Clausen's opera Dronningen af Blåtårn which was first staged in Copenhagen in 1999 by the Den Anden Opera.

== See also ==
- Jammers Minde

== Other sources ==
- Leonora Christina: Jammers Minde (publ. 1869, 1885, 1931)
- S. Birket Smith: Leonora Christina Grevinde Ulfeldts Historie I–II, Copenh. 1879–1881.
- Léonore Christine (1985) Souvenirs de misère (traduit du danois par Eric Eydoux, Paris, Aubier-Unesco)
- Eric Eydoux (1975) Les grandes heures du Danemark, (Paris, Plon-Perri)
