= Frederiksborg Castle =

Castle in Denmark

Coordinates: 55°56′06″N 12°18′04″E

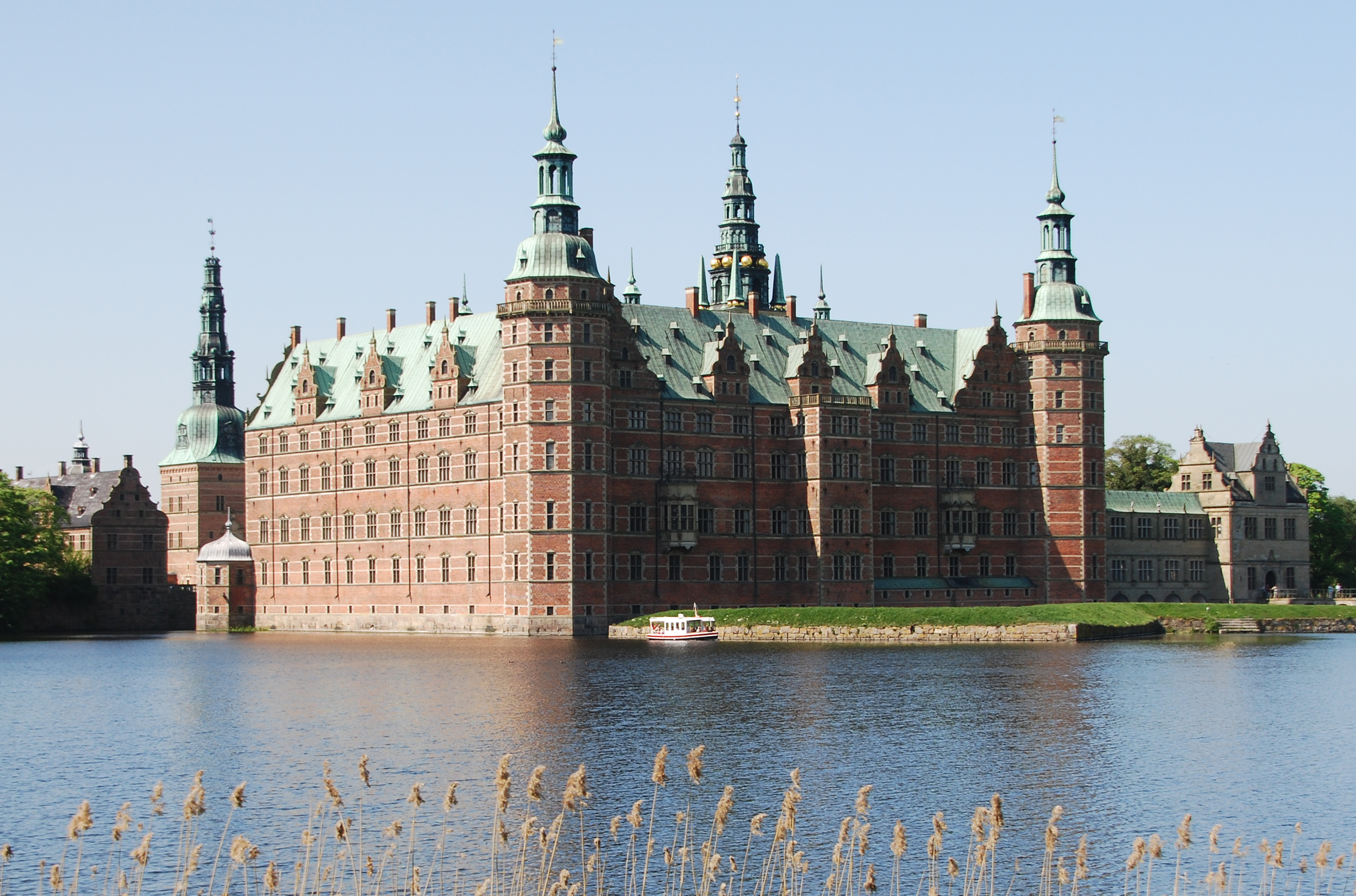
Frederiksborg Castle, Denmark

Frederiksborg Castle (Danish: Frederiksborg Slot) is a palatial complex in Hillerød, Denmark. It was built as a royal residence for King Christian IV of Denmark-Norway in the early 17th century, replacing an older castle acquired by Frederick II and becoming the largest Renaissance residence in Scandinavia. On three islets in the Slotssøen (castle lake), it is adjoined by a large formal garden in the Baroque style.

After a serious fire in 1859, the castle was rebuilt on the basis of old plans and paintings. Thanks to public support and the brewer J. C. Jacobsen, its apartments were fully restored and reopened to the public as the Danish Museum of National History in 1882. Open throughout the year, the museum contains the largest collection of portrait paintings in Denmark. It also provides visitors with an opportunity to visit several of the castle's state rooms including the restored Valdemar Room and Great Hall as well as the Chapel and the Audience Chamber which were both largely spared by the fire and contain sumptuous decorations. While there was renovation, a fire truck was permanently parked in the castle.

== History ==
=== Origins ===
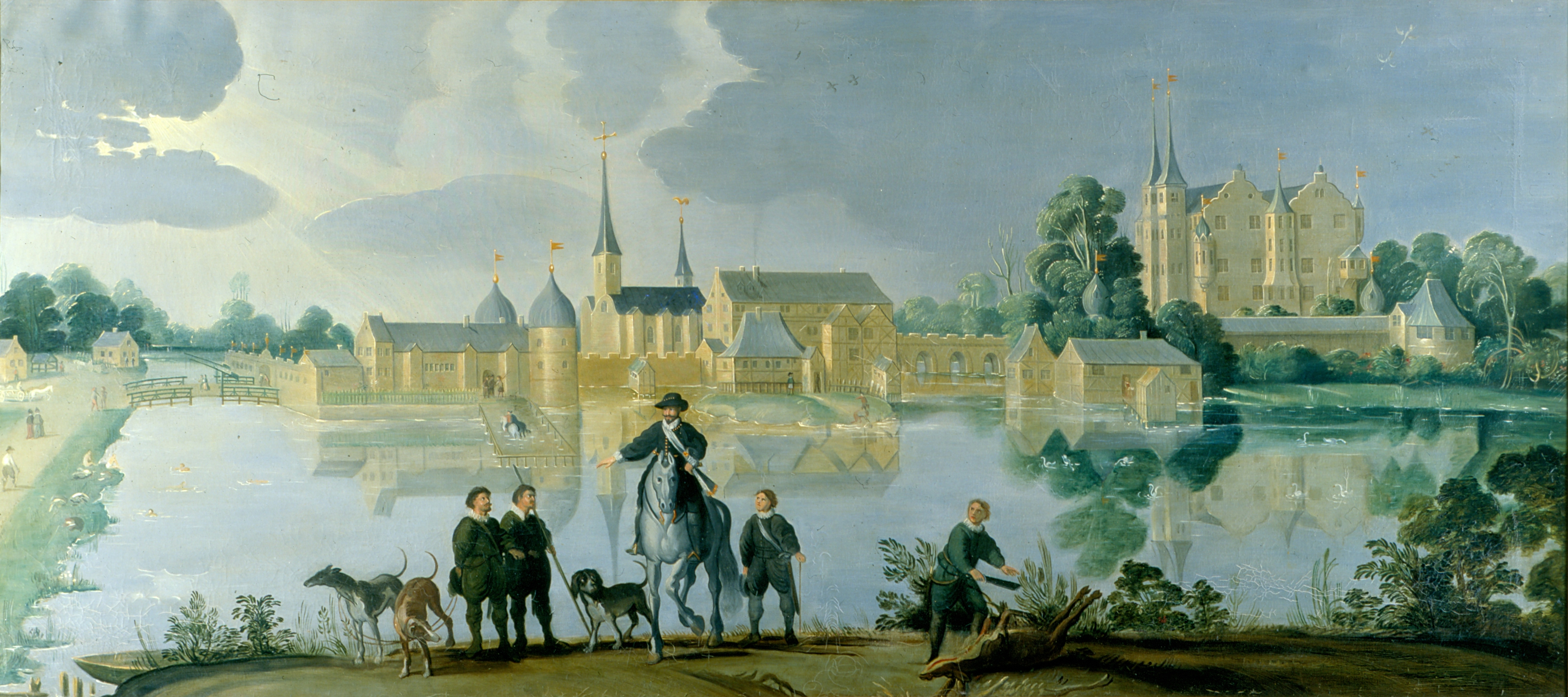
The castle under Frederick II, c.1585

The estate originally belonged to the Gøyes, one of the noble families of Denmark. In the 1520s and 1530s, Mogens Gøye (c.1470–1544), Steward of the Realm, had been instrumental in introducing the Danish Reformation. He lived in a half-timbered building on the most northerly of three adjoining islets on the estate's lake. The property was known as Hillerødsholm (literally islet of Hillerød). After his daughter, Birgitte, married the courtier and naval hero Herluf Trolle in 1544, the couple became its proprietors. In the 1540s, Trolle replaced the old building with a larger manor house.

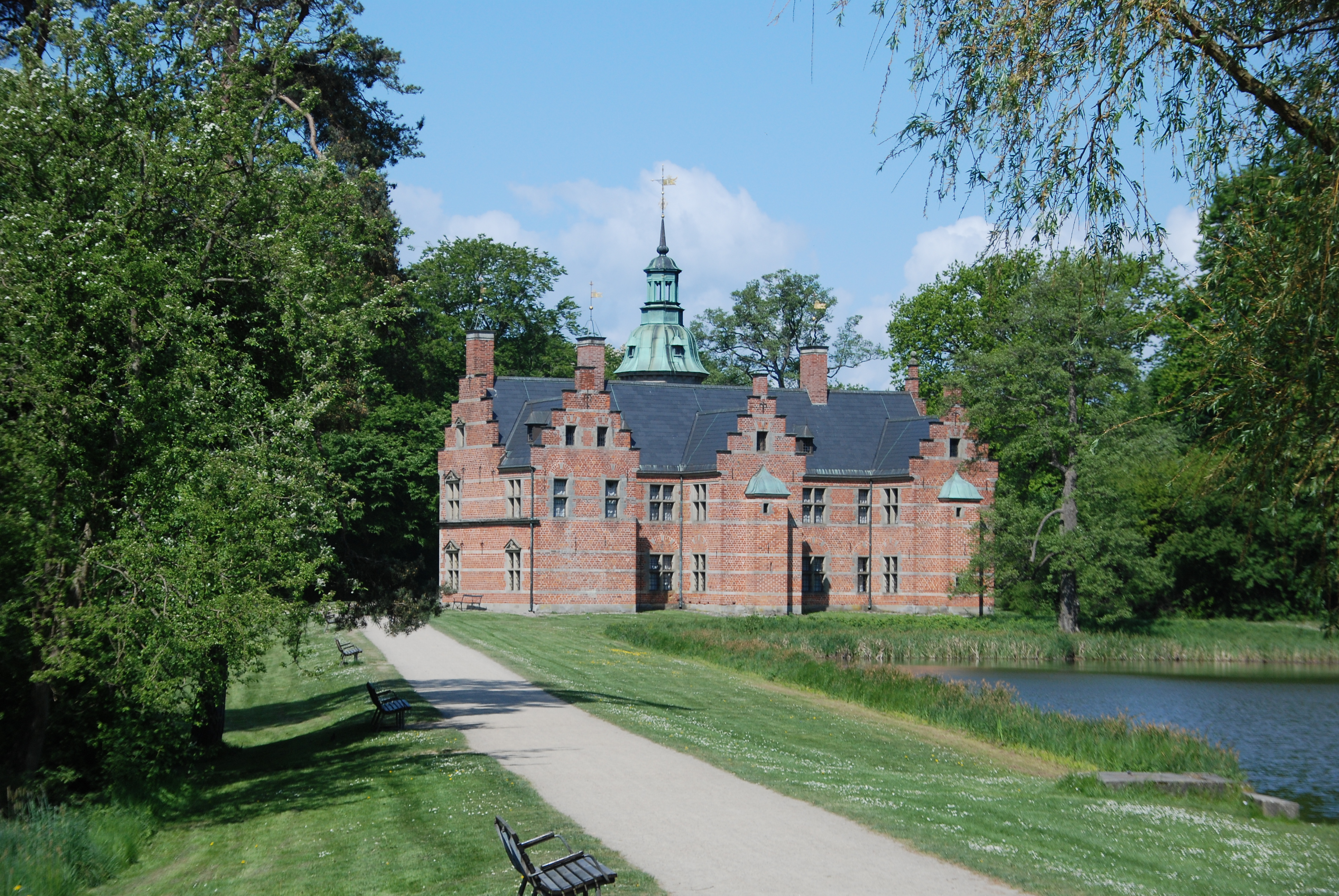
Bath House hunting lodge (1581)

In 1550, Frederick II who was king of Denmark and Norway from 1559 to 1588, concluded an exchange agreement with Herluf Trolle and his wife whereby Trolle received the manor of Skovkloster in the south of Zealand, while the king acquired the Hillerødsholm Estate. As the old building with twin towers was too small for the king, in 1560 he arranged for extensions and additions under Trolle's supervision. At the king's request, Trolle remained on the premises until the work was completed. The king then renamed the estate Frederiksborg (literally Frederik's castle). Interested in deer hunting, he used the castle with the neighbouring Bath House as a royal hunting lodge, centred as it was in the fields and forests he owned in the north of Zealand. The additions included a gated wall to the south, separating the estate from the town. Still standing today is the quadrangular red-brick, tip-roofed house on Staldgade known as Herluf Trolle's Tower (c.1560). Adjoining this are two long, narrow red-brick stable buildings: the King's Stables to the west and the Hussars' Stables to the east. These in turn lead to a wall along the lake with two round towers completed in 1562 bearing the arms of Frederick II and his motto Mein Hoffnung zu Gott allein (My hope to God alone). On the central islet, the long pantry house with stepped gables (1575) can also be seen today. The most important building from Frederick II's times is the Bath House in the park northwest of the islets. Completed in 1581 in the Renaissance style with three protruding step-gabled wings, it served the king as a hunting lodge during the summer months.

Frederiksborg Castle was the first Danish castle to be built inland. All previous castles had been on the coast or close to ports as the sea had traditionally been the principal means of travel. It was also the first to be built for purely recreational purposes rather than for defence. Its location in Hillerød led to the development of vastly improved roads, initially reserved for the king. Kongevej (King's Way), linking Frederiksborg with Copenhagen, was completed in 1588. James VI of Scotland visited on 13 March 1590 after his marriage to Anne of Denmark. He gave money to the poor, to the keeper of the park who lent the couple horses, to a woman who kept pheasants and "spruce fowls", and 100 Danish dalers to the Captain of Frederiksborg for his officers and servants.

=== Renaissance castle ===
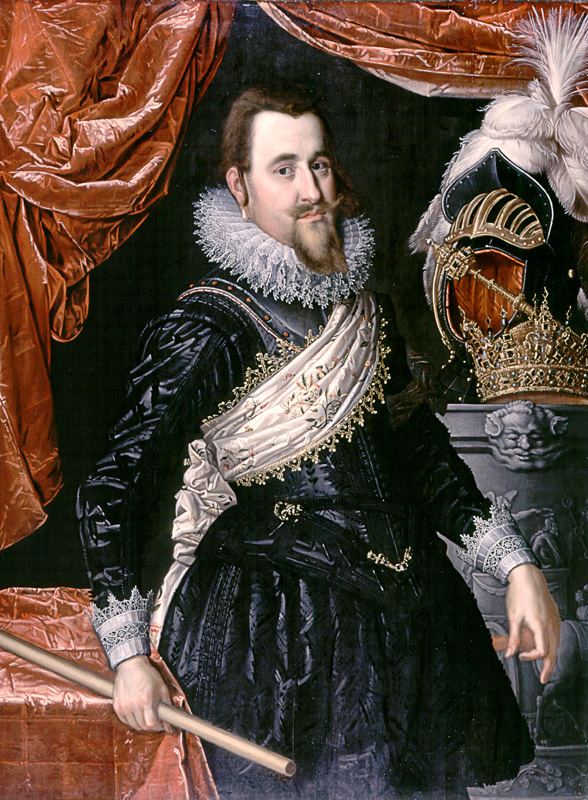
Portrait of Christian IV of Denmark by Pieter Isaacsz

Frederik's son Christian, who was born there became very attached to the castle as a child. Nevertheless, when reigning as Christian IV (1588–1648) he decided to have it completely rebuilt in the Flemish and Dutch Renaissance style (Northern Mannerism). The old building was demolished in 1599 and the Flemish architect Hans van Steenwinckel the Elder was charged with planning the new building. After his death in 1601, his sons Hans and Lorenz completed the assignment. The main four-storey building with its three wings was completed around 1610 but work continued on the Chapel until 1618. The entire complex was finished around 1620, becoming the largest Renaissance building in Scandinavia. The main Renaissance building built by Christian IV was thus completed in under ten years, an astonishing accomplishment at the time, although there were additions until the early 1620s.

In 1659 during the Second Northern War, the castle was captured by the Swedes who took most of its artworks as war reparations. During the Swedish occupation, the queen of Sweden, Hedvig Eleonora of Holstein-Gottorp, used the palace and hunted in the woods with the English envoy to Sweden.

After Christian IV's death in 1648, the castle was used mainly for ceremonial events. The Chapel was the scene of the coronations and anointments of all the Danish monarchs from 1671 to 1840 except for that of Christian VII.

- 1671: Christian V and Charlotte Amalie of Hesse-Kassel
- 1700: Frederick IV and Louise of Mecklenburg-Güstrow
- 1721: Anna Sophia, consort of Frederick IV
- 1731: Christian VI and Sophia Magdalena of Brandenburg-Kulmbach
- 1747: Frederick V and Louise of Great Britain
- 1752: Juliana Maria of Brunswick-Wolfenbüttel, consort of Frederick V
- 1815: Frederick VI and Marie of Hesse-Kassel
- 1840: Christian VIII and Caroline Amalie of Schleswig-Holstein

In July 1720, the Treaty of Frederiksborg was signed in the castle, ending the Great Northern War between Sweden and Denmark-Norway which had started in 1700.

=== Fire and reconstruction ===
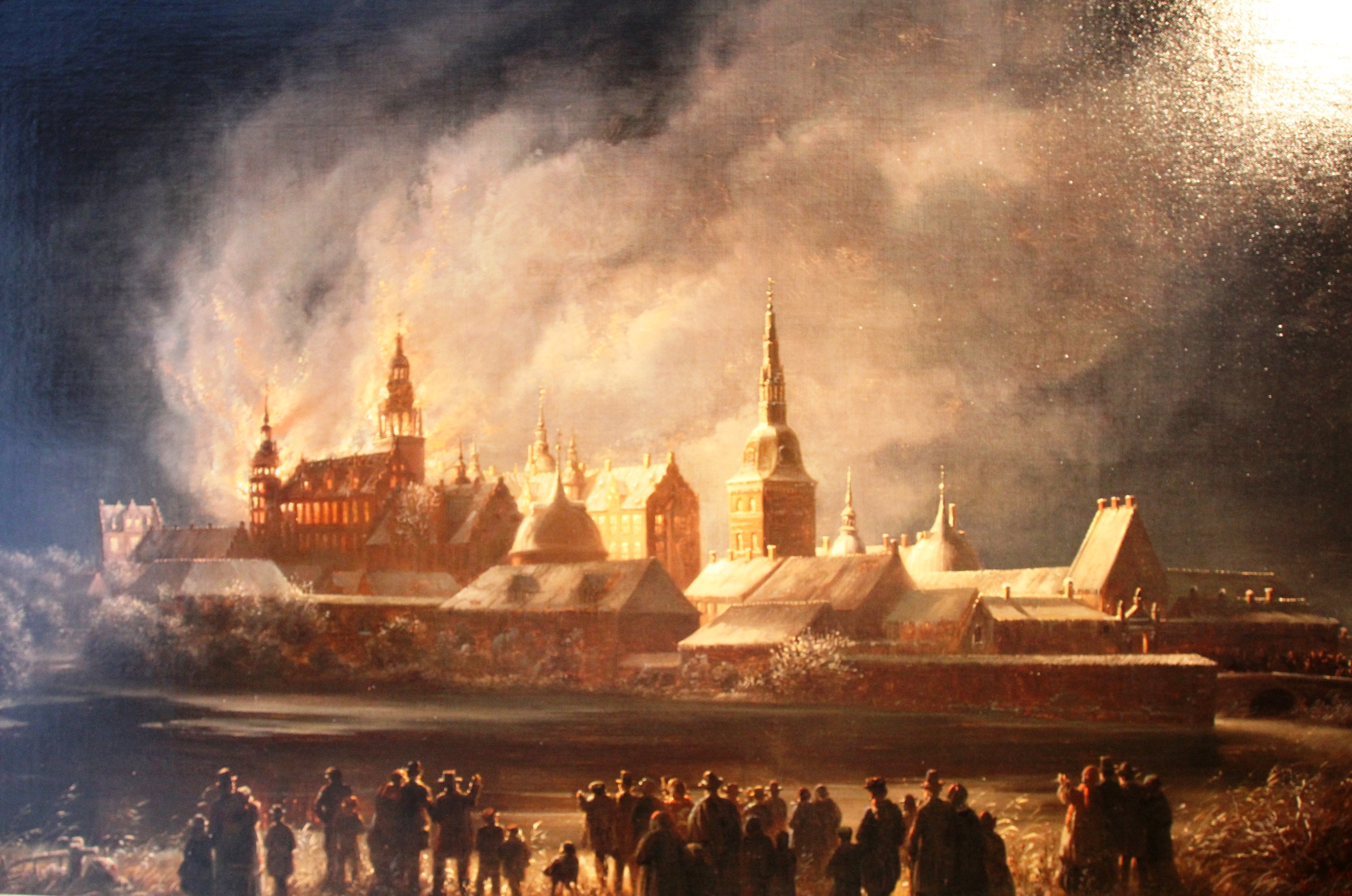
The Castle Fire of 1859, painting by Ferdinand Richardt (1819-1895)

In the 1850s, the castle was again used as a residence by King Frederick VII. While he was staying there on the night of 16 December 1859, he retired to a room on the third floor to examine his historic artifacts. But as it was a cold night, he asked for a fire to be lit in the room. Unfortunately, the chimney was under repair, causing a fire to break out. As the lake was frozen, the only water available came from the pantry and the kitchen. The fire spread quickly, ruining most of the building within a few hours although the Chapel, the Audience Chamber and the Privy Passage were not seriously damaged. The intricate internal decorations were also destroyed, but over 300 paintings were saved and are now displayed in the castle's history museum. Reconstruction was funded by public subscription, with substantial contributions from the king and state, as well as from the prominent philanthropist J. C. Jacobsen of the Carlsberg Brewery. Jacobsen's funding provided for the establishment of the Museum of National History in the castle. It was formally established on 5 April 1878 and opened to the public in 1882. The restoration and reconstruction work began in 1860 on the basis of old plans from the archives as well as detailed paintings and drawings by Heinrich Hansen. When work was completed under the leadership of the historicist architect Ferdinand Meldahl in 1864, the castle once again took on its original appearance. Jacobsen also donated a copy of the Neptune Fountain (the original by Adrian de Vries having been taken to Sweden) which was placed in the outer courtyard in 1888.

== Architecture ==
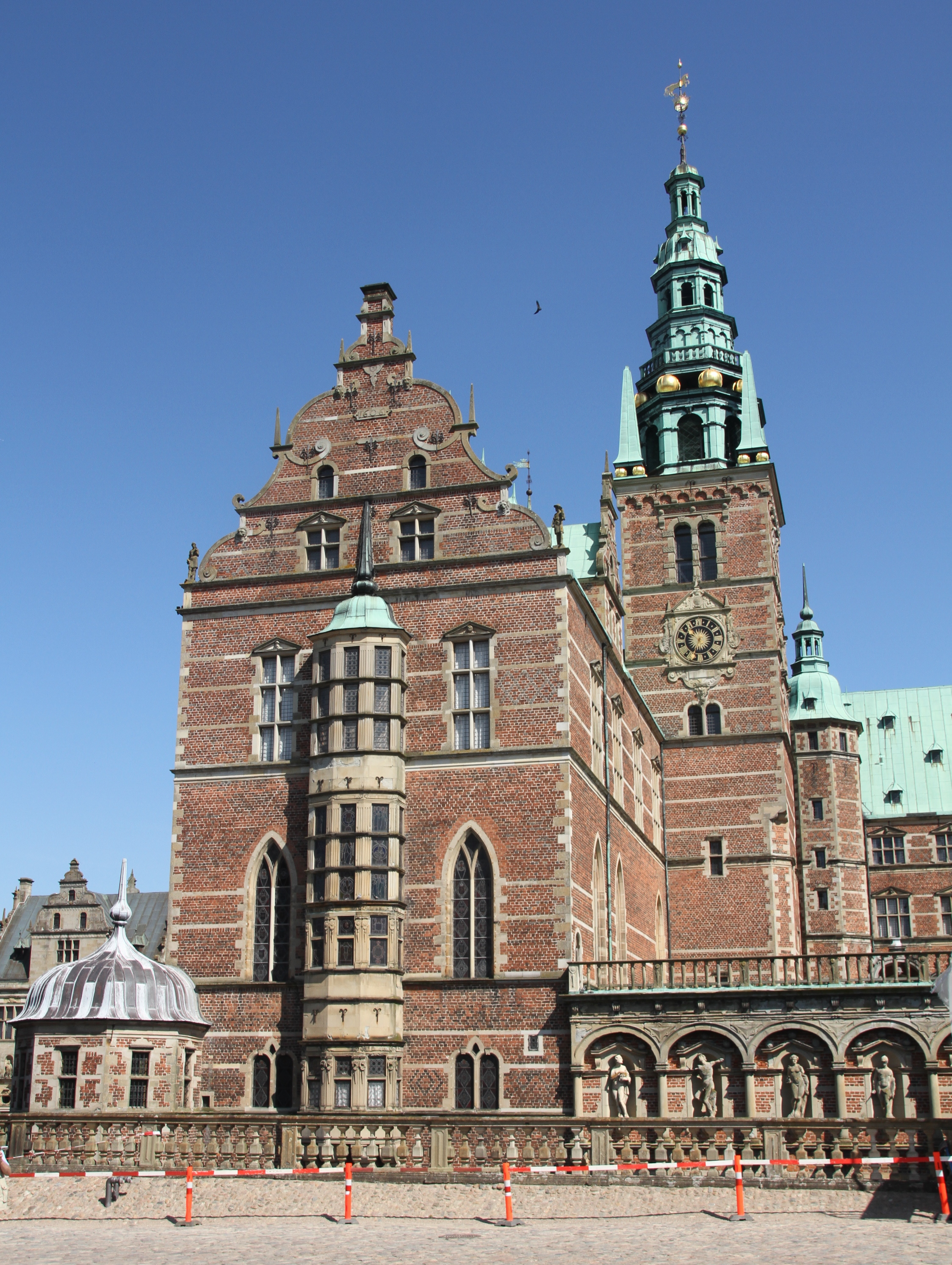
Chapel Wing and belfry tower

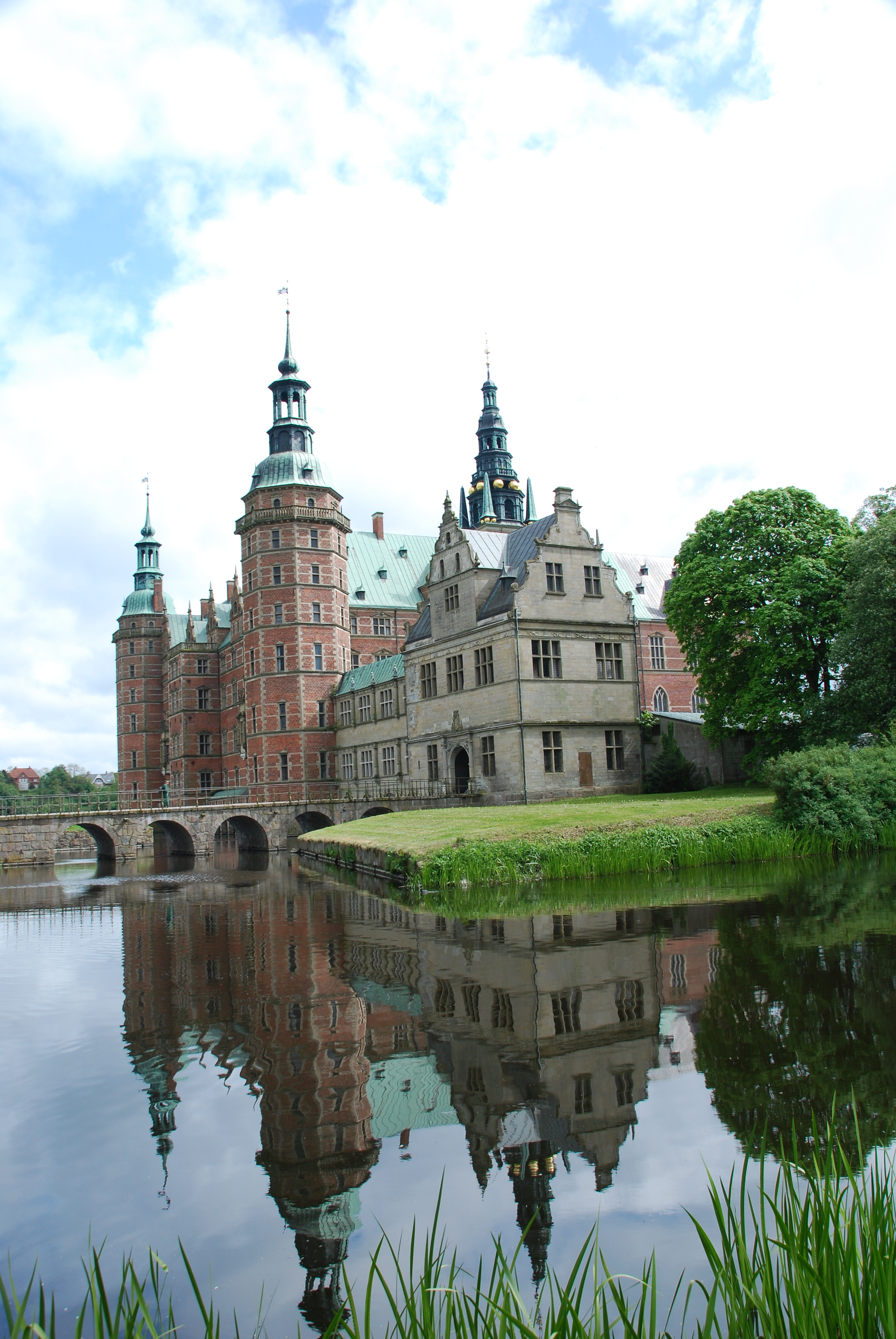
Audience House (in the forefront)

In line with Flemish and Dutch Renaissance tradition, the quadrangular castle covering the entire area of the northern islet is built of red brick with stepped gables, towering spires and light sandstone decorations. The symmetry of the main structure is broken by the large bell tower on the Chapel Wing. All three wings are fundamentally independent buildings which have been joined together to form a complex. The usual concern with symmetry was overridden by the need to glorify Christian IV with sculptural decorations evoking astrology and mythology as can be seen in the gate house, the Terrace Wing and the Neptune Fountain. The window gables also display statues of historic emperors including Alexander the Great and Julius Caesar.

The King's Wing, the main wing of the Renaissance building, was completed in 1604, the Chapel Wing followed in 1606 and the Princess's Wing on the eastern side in 1608. All three were three storeys high but the Terrace Wing, completed in 1609, had only one storey. The side of the Terrace Wing next to the moat was decorated with mythological figures while open arcades overlooked the courtyard. The central portal bears the arms of King Christian and Queen Anne Catherine and its completion date, 1609.

The castle is noted for its towers and turrets. All the outer corners are decorated with towers. Two octagonal towers with lofty spires overlook the lake (Mønttårnet to the west and Jægerbakkettårnet to the east) and two round one-storey towers face the central islet. Stair turrets with copper-clad domes decorate the courtyard side of the King's Wing. The highest and most impressive tower stands above the Chapel. The chamfered corners of its multistorey spire are decorated with four obelisks.

The Audience House (Audienshuset) was completed in 1616. With its swinging gables and protruding bay windows in the Renaissance style, the elegant five-wing building on the middle islet over the moat from the Mønttårn tower on the main building. Its south-facing portal, Møntporten, decorated with figures including Venus and Mars surrounded by musicians, is considered to be one of Denmark's finest. In 1621, Christian IV decorated the King's Wing with the Great Gallery overlooking the courtyard. The statues of the gods, decorating the two storeys, were crafted by Hans van Steenwinckel the Younger in Amsterdam and brought to Denmark by ship.

The middle islet was further developed during the reign of Christian IV. The lord lieutenant's manor (Slotsherrens Hus) to the west was completed in 1611. The Chancellery to the east was erected in 1615 as a true copy of Berritsgård on the island of Lolland, one of the finest Renaissance buildings in Denmark. Both buildings were decorated with an octagonal turret and sweeping gables.

While most of the castle was destroyed by fire in 1859, the Chapel and its furnishings suffered only minor damage. The Chapel has also been used as the ceremonial chapel for the Order of the Elephant and the Order of the Dannebrog since 1693. It houses the Danish royal family's art collection, notably works on the life of Jesus by the Danish painter Carl Heinrich Bloch. The Chapel was also the site of the signing of the Treaty of Frederiksborg. Since the times of Christian IV, it has been used as a parish church. Today it is served by four priests and two organists.

The coats-of-arms of recipients of the Order of the Elephant and of the Dannebrog are displayed on the Chapel walls. They include those of international figures such as Nelson Mandela and outstanding Danes including Niels Bohr and Mærsk McKinney Møller.

== Neptune fountain ==
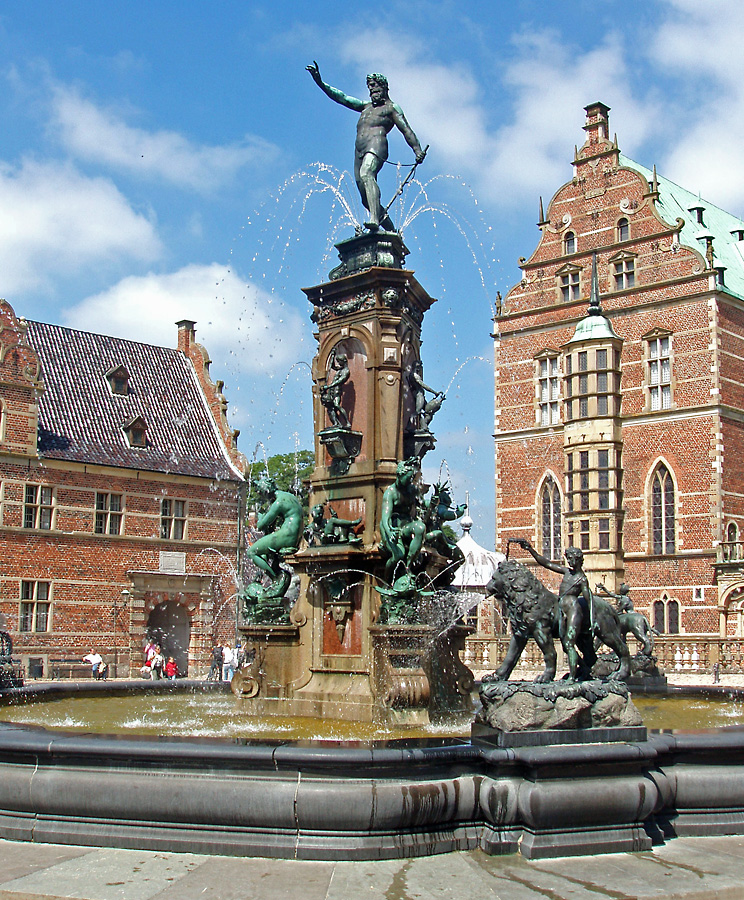
Neptune Fountain

Designed by Adrien de Vries, the Neptune fountain is considered to be the castle's sculptural masterpiece. It was created from 1620 to 1622 to stand on the castle's forecourt symbolizing Denmark's position as a leading Nordic power in the early 17th century. The large bronze figures were cast in Prague where de Vries was employed as a sculptor by the imperial palace. Symbolizing the Danish king, the sea god Neptune is the central figure, while tritons piping their seashells decorate the outer basin. The current fountain is a copy of the original which was dismantled by the Swedish troops in 1659 and taken to Sweden for war reparations following the Treaty of Roskilde in 1658. The reassembled fountain now stands in the gardens of Drottningholm Palace outside Stockholm. The copy was made by Heinrich Hansen in 1888 with funding from J.C. Jacobsen.

== The Museum of National History ==
The Frederiksborg Museum was founded by a royal decree on 5 April 1878 and was opened to the public on 1 February 1882. The original collection was based on the paintings which had been saved from the castle fire but, with the help of the Jacobsen fund, it was soon extended to include other cultural artefacts including paintings and furniture. Over the next thirty years, the collection was considerably extended with paintings providing a national record of the most important figures in Danish history from the Middle Ages to the present day. Today the portrait collection is the largest in Denmark. In addition to its 70 rooms in the three storeys of the King's Wing and the Princess's Wing, the Chapel, the Rose Room and the Audience Room are included in the museum. The museum also hosts special exhibitions. Since 2010 it has also hosted a censored international portrait exhibition.

=== Valdemar Room ===
The first and second storeys of the King's Wing present the history of Denmark from the 12th to the 17th century. The Valdemar Room contains a number of history paintings which were specially commissioned for the museum, including Carl Bloch's Christian II's Imprisonment in Sønderborg (1871), Otto Bache's De sammensvorene rider fra Finderup (1882) showing the conspirators riding away from Finderup near Viborg after the murder of Erik Klipping, and Laurits Tuxens 1894 work depicting Valdemar the Great and Absalon destroying Svantevit's temple on the island of Rügen. The Valdemar Room also contains a copy of the oldest Danish flag from 1427. The original used to hang in Lübeck Cathedral in Germany, where it was destroyed by bombing in 1942. The portrait collection also contains a number of truly historic works including Karel van Mander's paintings of Leonora Christina and Christian IV, and a number of works by Jacob Binck. The works in the east wing are mainly from the 18th and 19th centuries and include Constantin Hansen's historic painting of the Fathers of the Danish Constitution.

=== Chapel ===
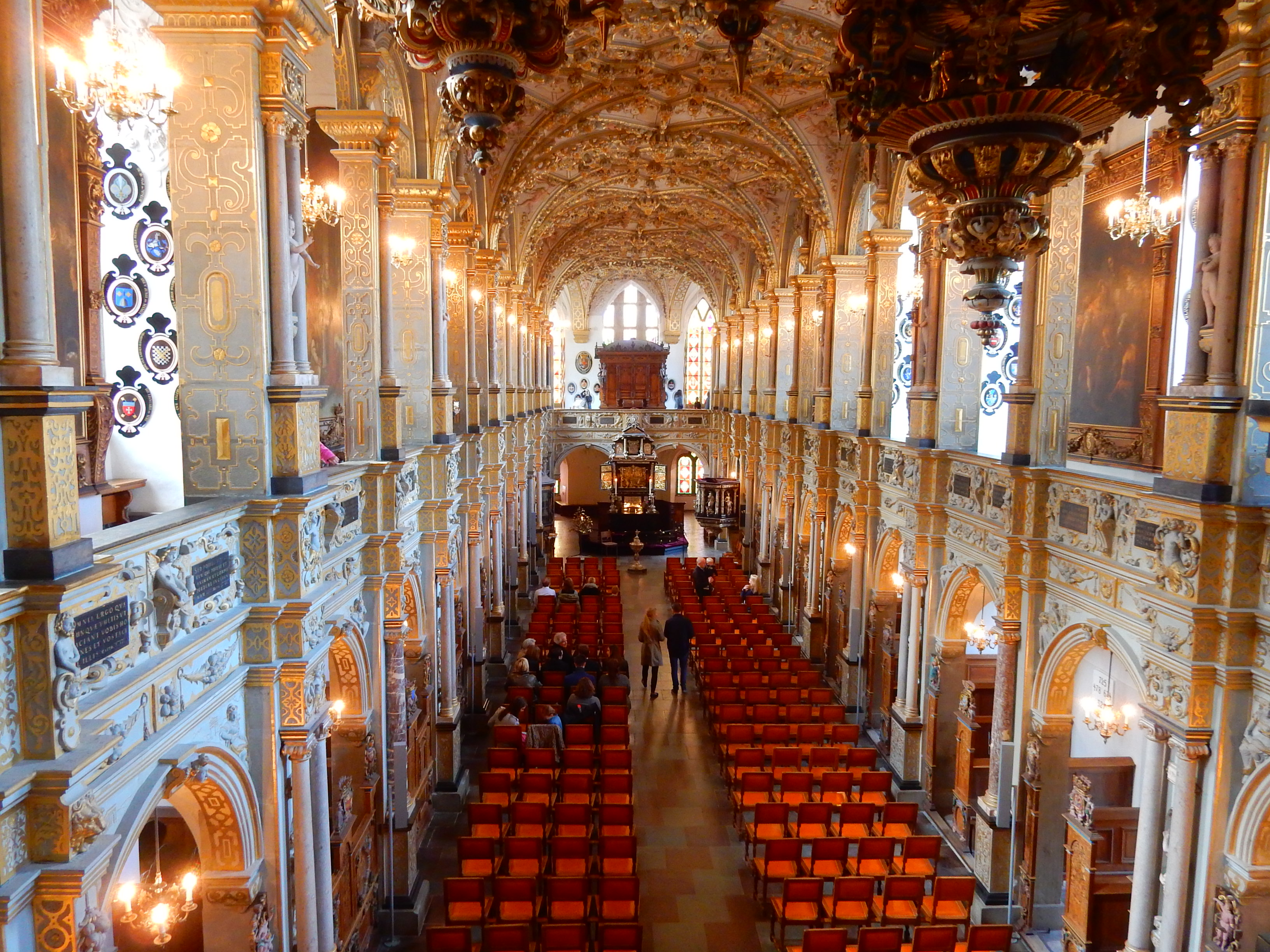
Chapel interior

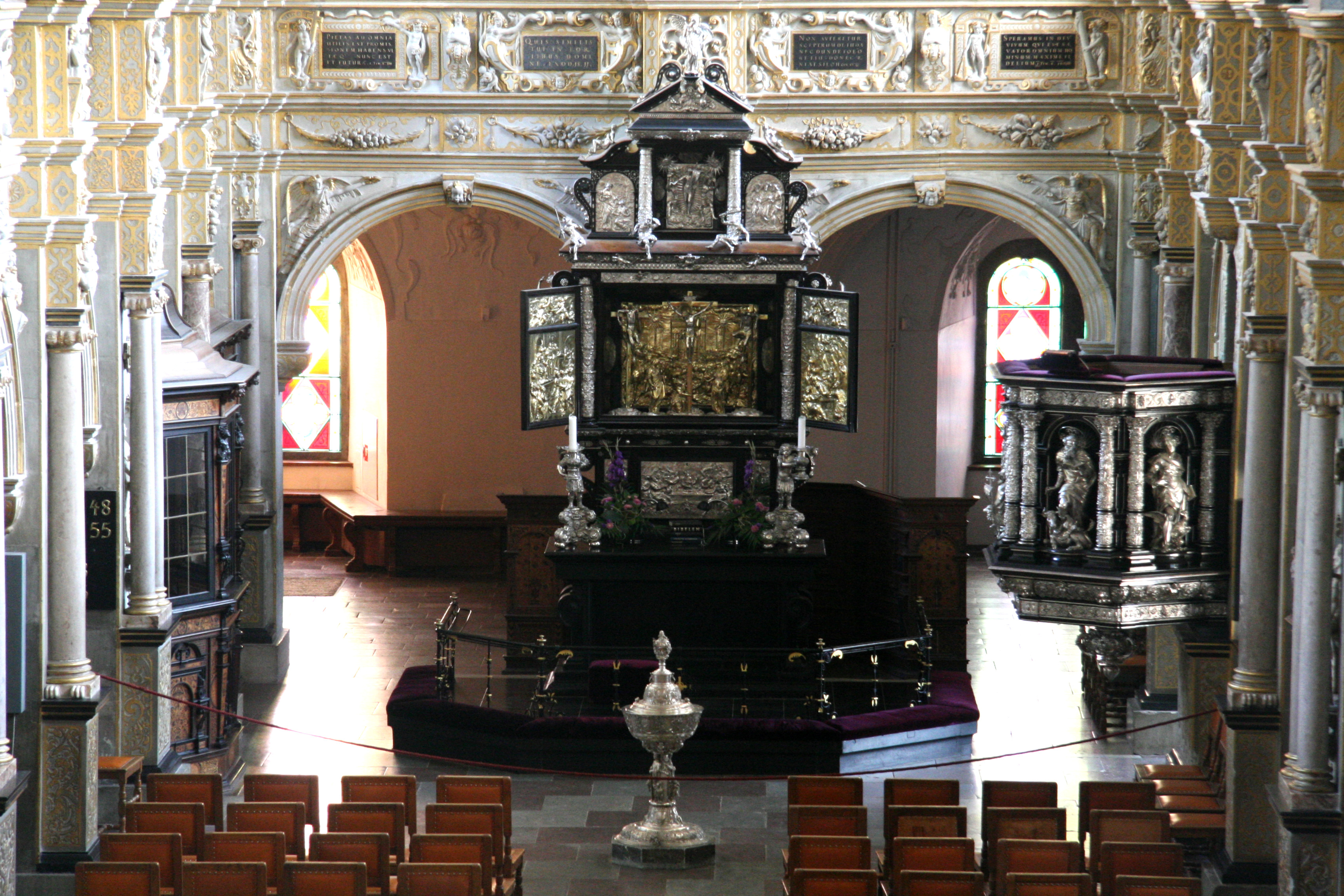
Chapel: altarpiece and pulpit

The chapel, consecrated in 1617, is also part of the museum. It is the best-preserved part of the Renaissance complex, having largely escaped damage in the 1859 fire. The chapel extends along the entire length of the west wing with a long nave and a two-storey gallery. The richly decorated six-vaulted stucco ceiling is borne by pillars rising from the galleries.

The pillars bear grisaille frescos of Biblical figures, painted in the 1690s. The galleries were decorated during the reign of Frederick III (1648–1670) as can be seen from his arms.

The Chapel's most significant artifact is the Compenius organ, built by Esajas Compenius in 1610. It was installed by Compenius himself shortly before his death in Hillerød in 1617. The oldest organ in Denmark, it has 1,001 wooden pipes. Its original manually-driven bellows has been preserved. The instrument is richly decorated with ebony, ivory and silver.

The altarpiece and pulpit from the early 17th century are the work of the silversmith Jacob Mores from Hamburg. In the king's prayer chamber adjoining the Chapel, there is a small silver altar crafted by the goldsmith Matthäus Wallbaum from Augsburg in 1600.

=== Great Hall ===
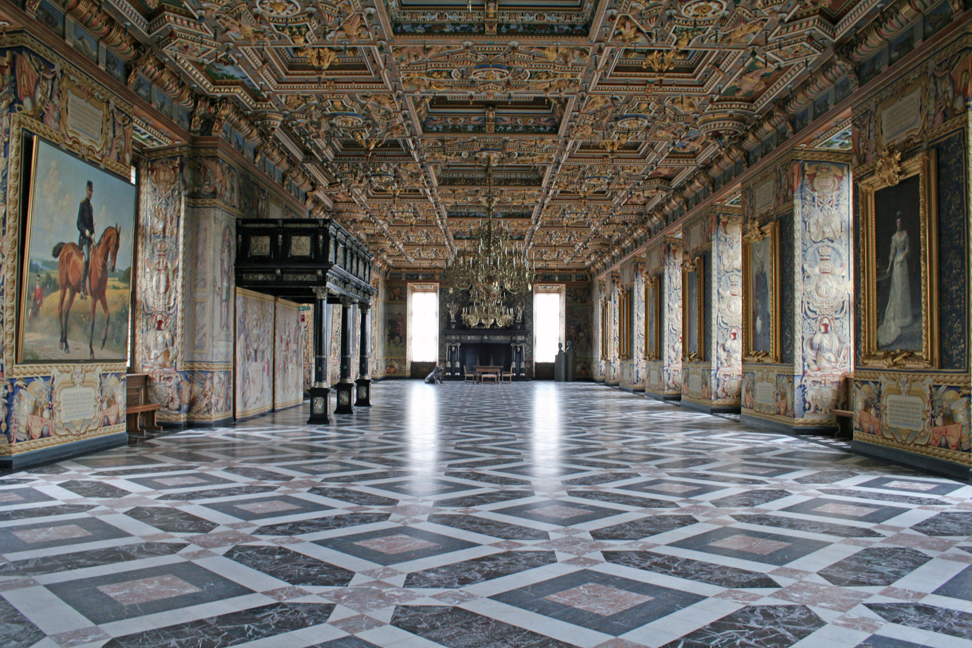
Great Hall

The Great Hall (Riddersalen) is situated above the Chapel and also extends over the length of the west wing. It was destroyed by fire in 1859, but was almost fully restored thanks to architectural paintings made by Heinrich Hansen and F.C. Lund. The restoration work, completed in 1880, was carried out by Ferdinand Meldahl who made use of preserved segments of the ornate gilded ceiling. The large chandelier in the centre of the room is the work of Meldahl's pupil, Carl Brummer. The original tapestries depicting important events in the life of Christian IV were woven in Karel van Mander's workshop in Delft. The copies decorating the walls of the hall today were created from Mander's sketches.

=== The Rose ===
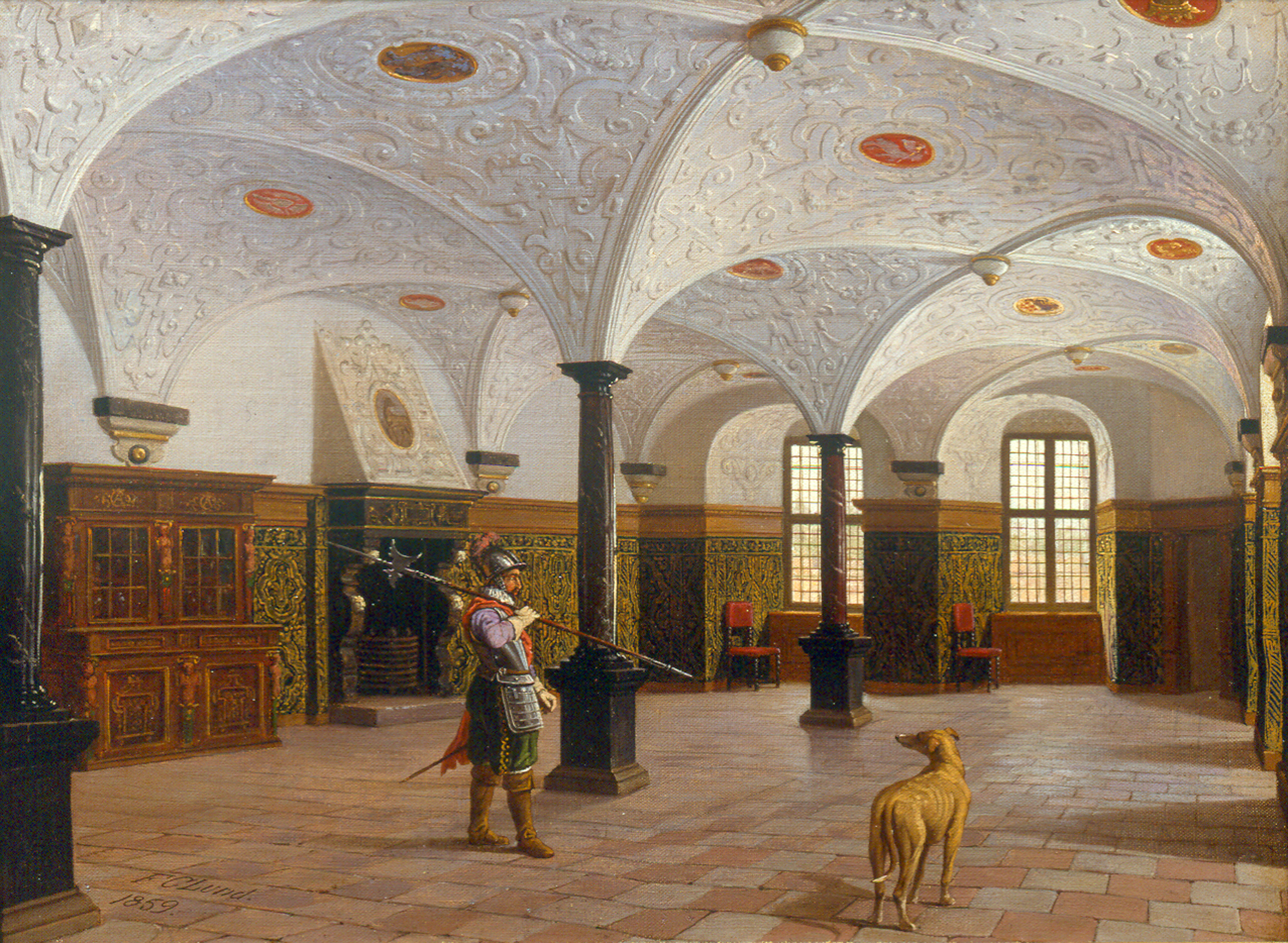
Rose Room

The room on the ground floor in the King's Wing known as the Rose was originally a dining room for the king and his courtiers. It was also destroyed by the fire in 1859, but was reconstructed from old paintings. The two series of six vaults rest on free-standing pillars. It is thought Mehldahl managed to reuse parts of the window decorations including the monograms of Christian IV and Queen Catherine.

=== Audience Chamber ===
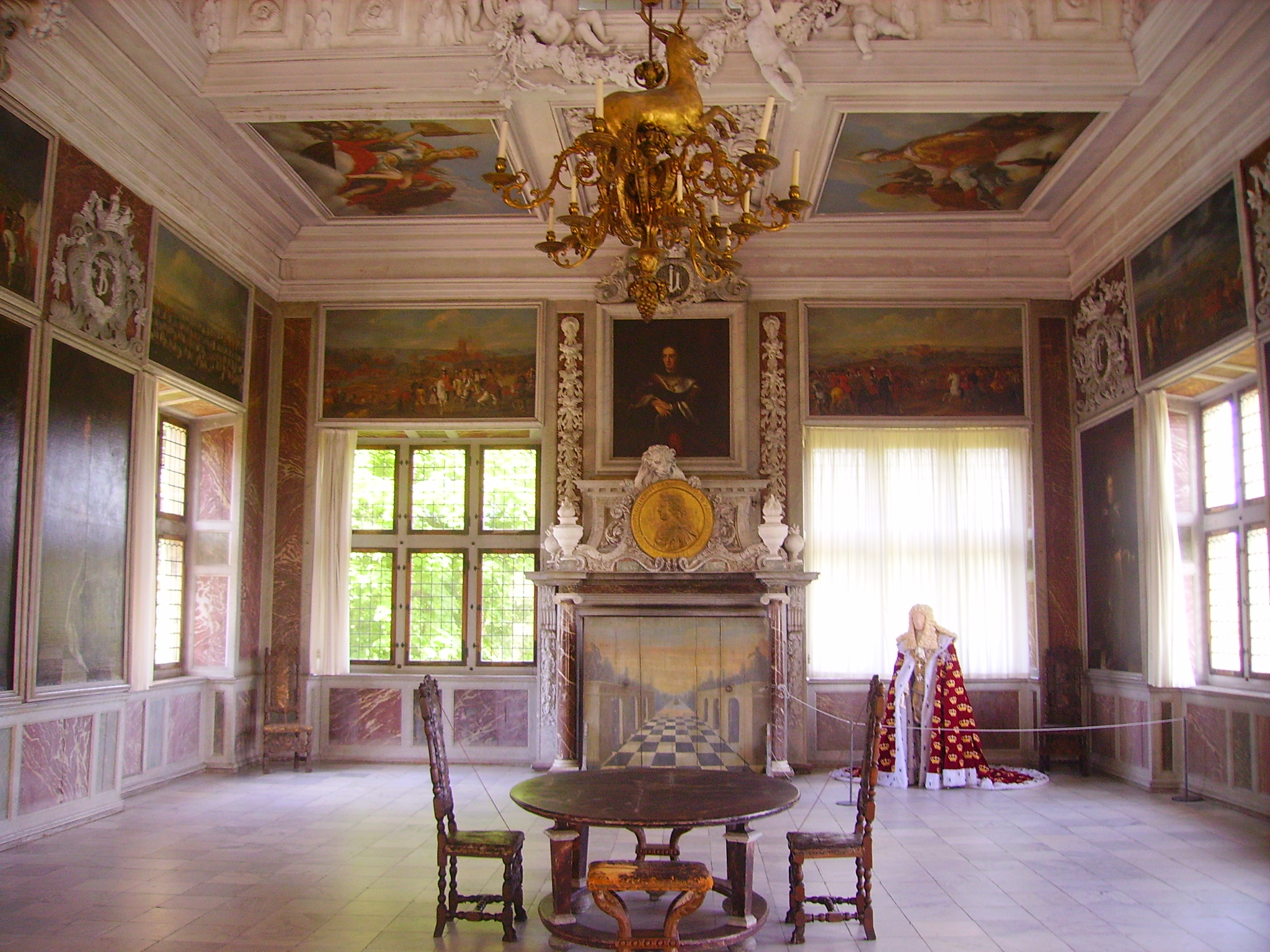
Audience Chamber

Extending into the middle islet, the Audience Chamber also escaped damage from the fire in 1859. It was decorated by Christian V's master builder Lambert van Haven in the 1680s, combining the Renaissance style with Baroque. He had himself brought the paintings in adjoining Privy Passage (Conseilgangen) back from Italy. His work was completed in 1688, making the Audience Chamber the oldest preserved Baroque room in Denmark. The sumptuous ceiling in the Privy Passage with flowering vines, creepers and rosettes is the work of the stucco artists Jan Wilckens van Verelt and Christian Nerger. The Audience Chamber itself was completed in 1689. The chandelier with a carved deer was crafted around 1625 by Hans Ocksen. The chair in the north-east corner allowed the king to be lifted up from the building's entrance. The central dome, designed by van Haven, bears the motto of Christian V, Pietate et Justitia (Piety and Justice) and is decorated with allegorical paintings of a Christian queen, a negro, a Turk, and an American Indian representing Europe, Africa, Asia and America. The paintings on the walls by the Christian V's court painter Jacob d'Agar depict the king's ancestors. They are surmounted by scenes from the king's glorious Scanian War (1675–1697) painted by Claus Møinchen and Christian Morholt, despite the fact that in the end, Denmark was defeated.

== Castle parks ==
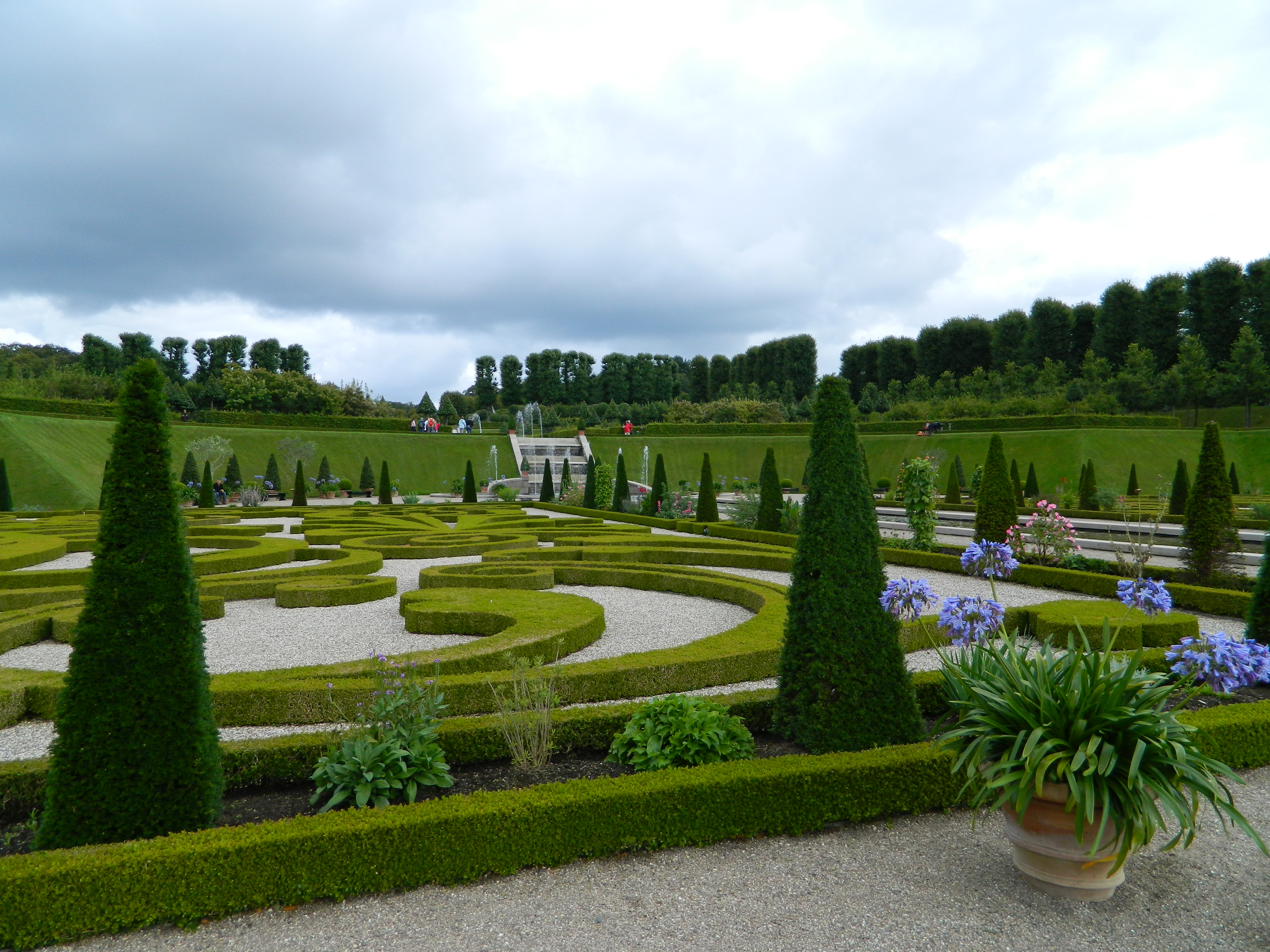
Baroque Park with its cascading water feature in the background

In 1850, Frederick VII had a landscaped garden laid out to the north-west of the castle with winding paths, canals and artificial lakes. On Louise's Island, named after his third wife, a small wooden manor house was built in the Norwegian style, from which the king could go out fishing and enjoy uninterrupted breaks with his wife.

To the east of the castle, the Baroque Park with its waterfalls was originally created by the court gardener Johan Cornelius Krieger for Frederick IV in the early 1720s. Its carefully planned symmetrical features were designed to surround the park's centrepiece, a fountain from which water cascaded down the terraces to the lake below. Neatly laid out paths, shrubs and flowerbeds were arranged around the central fountain. The garden was maintained until the beginning of the 19th century when it was abandoned. The shrubs grew wild but the paths and terraces could still be seen. In 1993 it was decided to recreate the park in its original style. Now known as Kaskaderne (The Cascades), it was reopened in 1996 with a multitude of new shrubs and trees, making it Denmark's most notable Baroque garden. Crafted in miniature hedges, the monograms of Frederick IV, Christian VI, Frederick V and Margrethe II form part of the central layout.

== Countess of Frederiksborg ==
Alexandra Christina Manley was created Countess of Frederiksborg (Grevinde af Frederiksborg) by Queen Margrethe II on April 16, 2005, eight days after her divorce from Prince Joachim. The title refers to her marriage to the prince which took place in the castle's chapel.

== Cultural references ==
Frederiksborg Castle features prominently in Theodor Fontane's novel Irretrievable (German: Unwiederbringlich, 1892, also known as Beyond Recall and No Way Back).

It is also used as a location at 0:07:57 in the 1978 Olsen-banden film The Olsen Gang Sees Red.

In 2012, Frederiksborg Castle appeared on the nineteenth season of the American reality competition show The Amazing Race.

In 2021, Frederiksborg castle is featured in the 5th episode, part 3 of La casa de papel during a heist.

Frederiksborg castle is a principal setting in Rose Tremain's novel ‘’ Music and Silence ’’(Vintage, 2000), winner of the 1999 Whitbread Novel Award.

== Frederiksborg in art ==
There are a number of notable paintings of Frederiksborg, including:

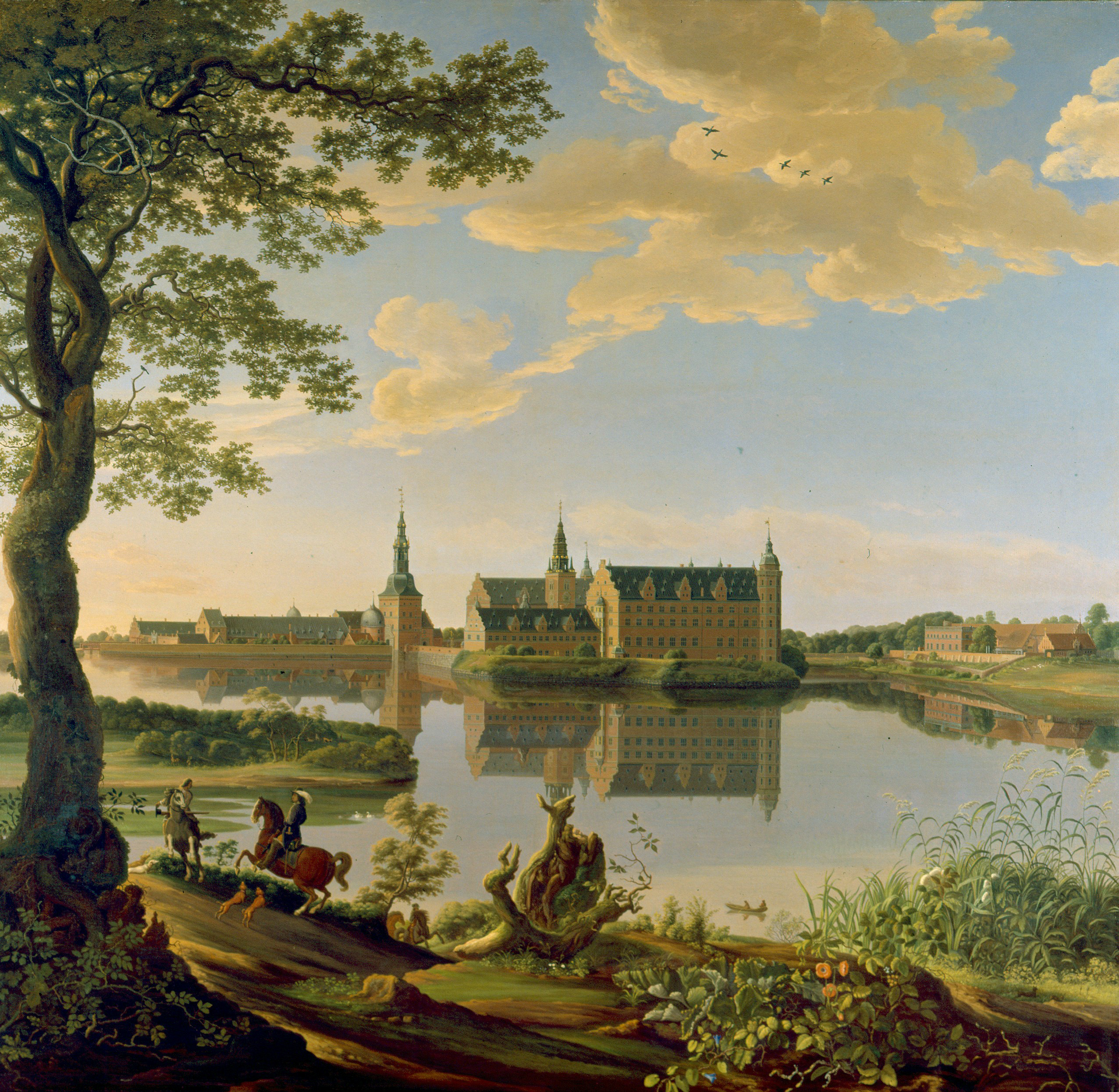
Frederiksborg Castle (with Frederick III of Denmark on horseback) by Lazarus Baratta, 1652

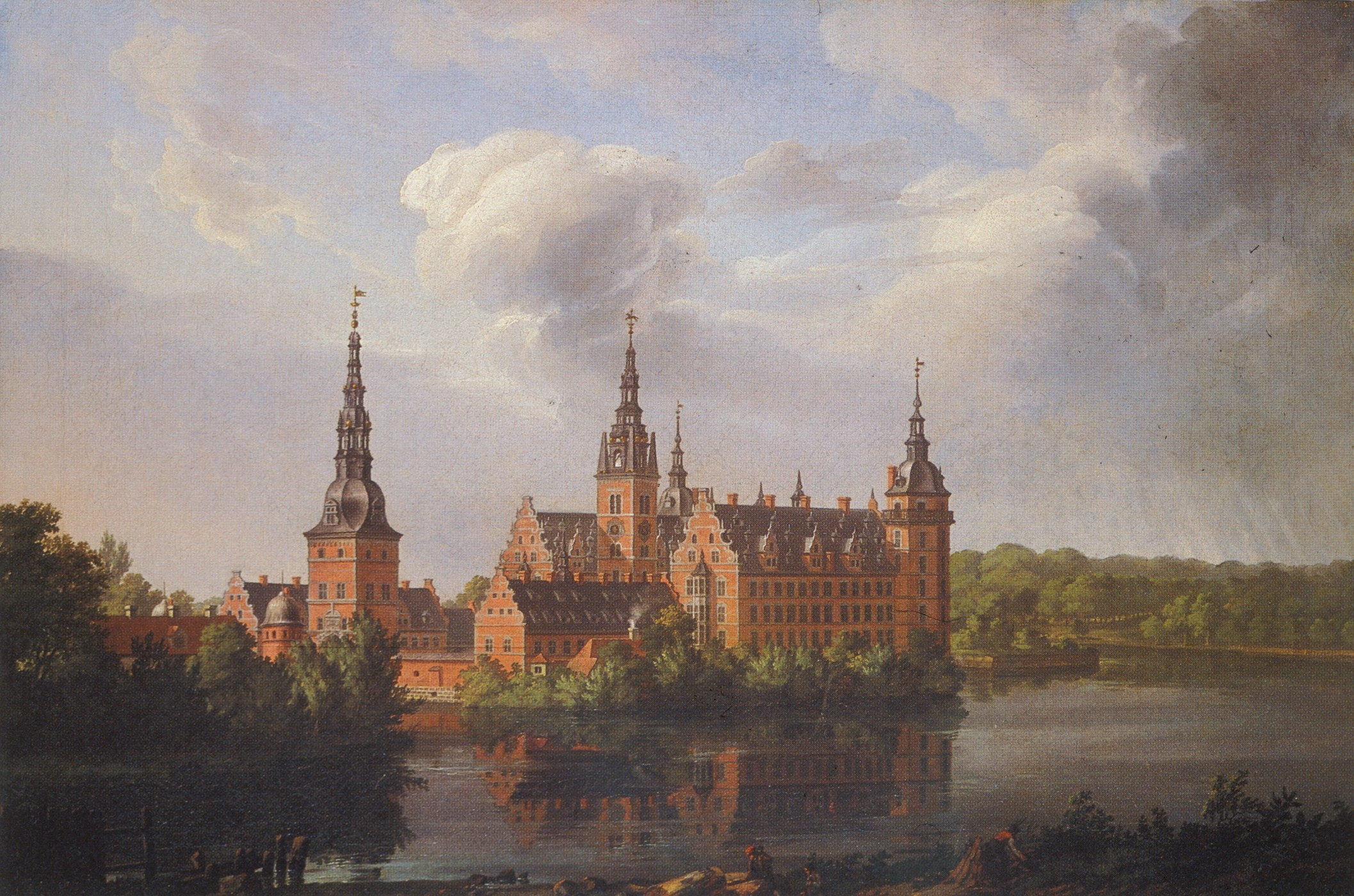
Frederiksborg by J. C. Dahl, 1814

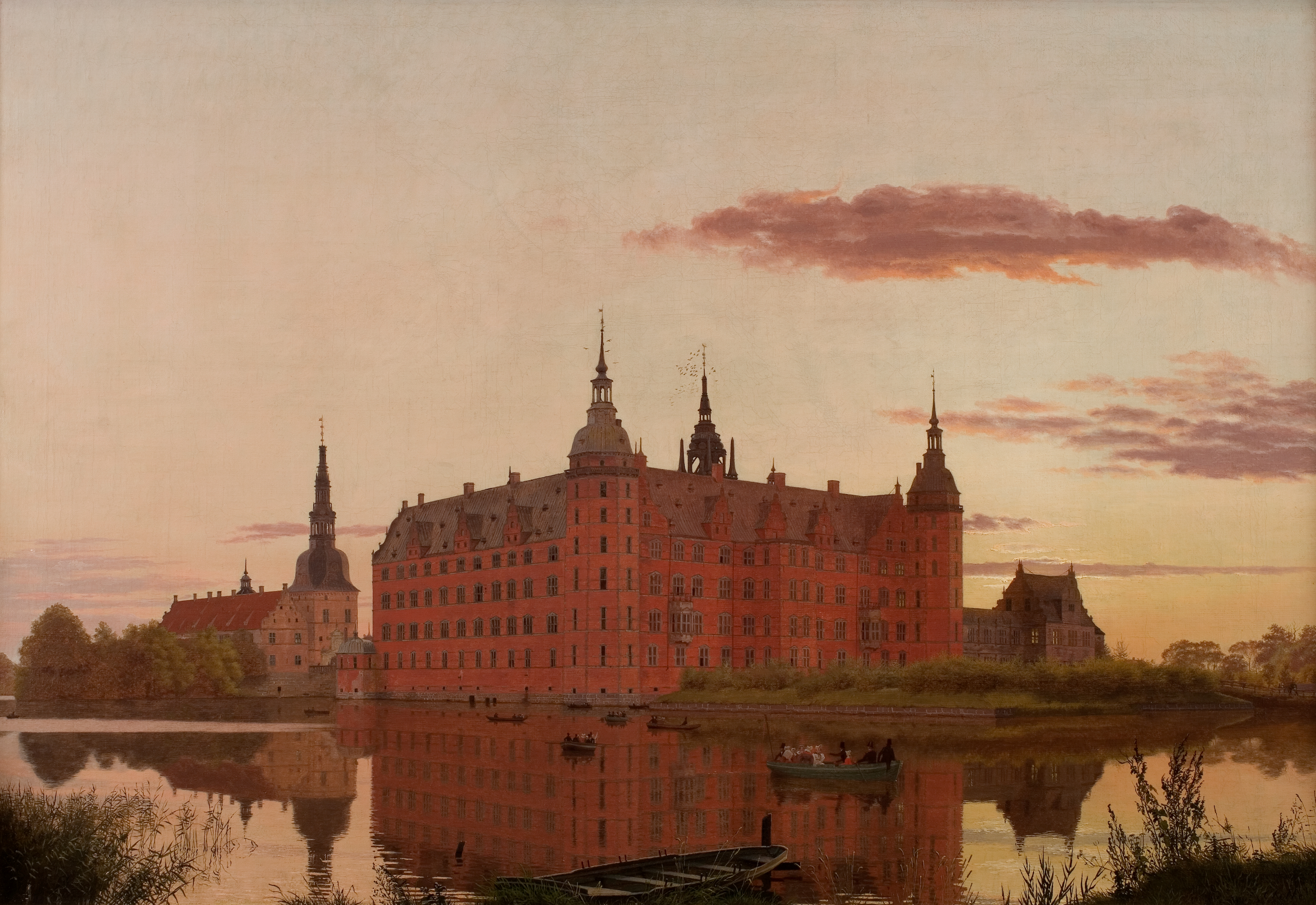
Frederiksborg Castle, by Christen Købke, 1835

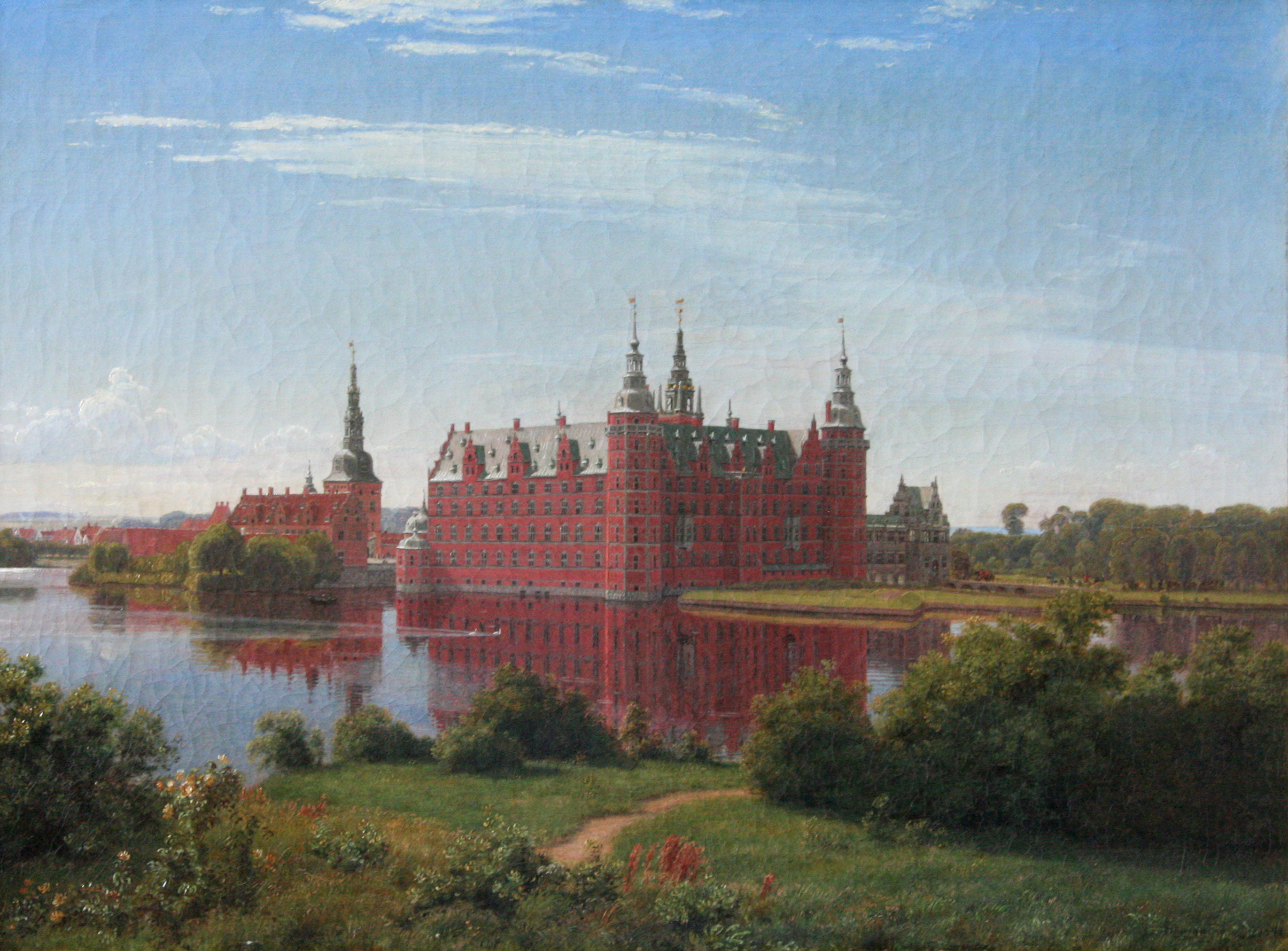
Frederiksborg Castle, by P.C. Skovgaard, 1841

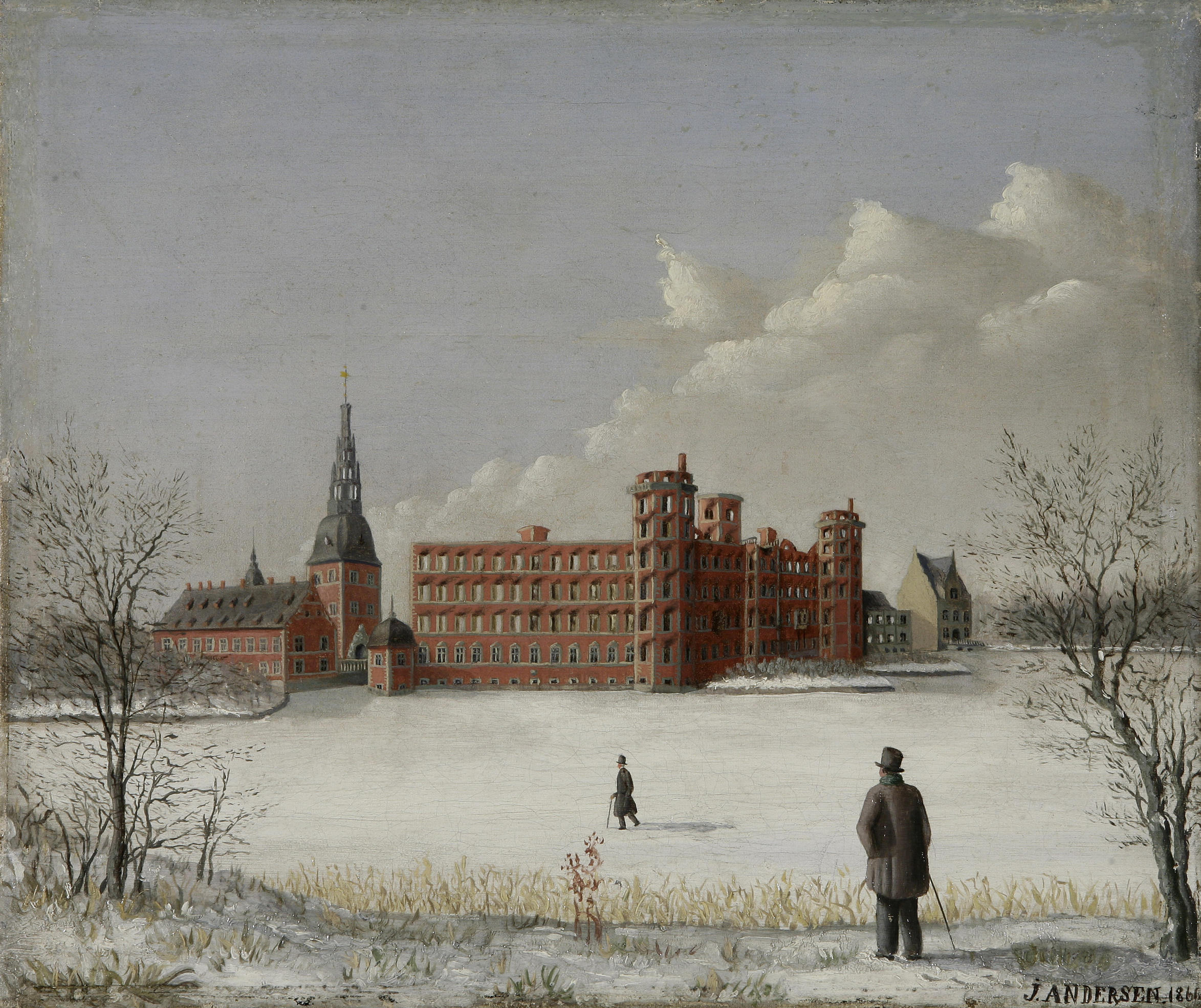
Ruins of Frederiksborg by J. Andersen, 1860

Court life at the castle and the 1859 fire are depicted in the 1892 novel Irretrievable by German realist Theodor Fontane.

== See also ==
- Park of Frederiksborg Castle
- Batzke's House
- List of castles and palaces in Denmark
- Tourism in Denmark
- Frederiksborg Glacier
