= Park of Frederiksborg Castle =

Park in the north and west of Frederiksborg Castle

Coordinates: 55.939°N 12.303°E

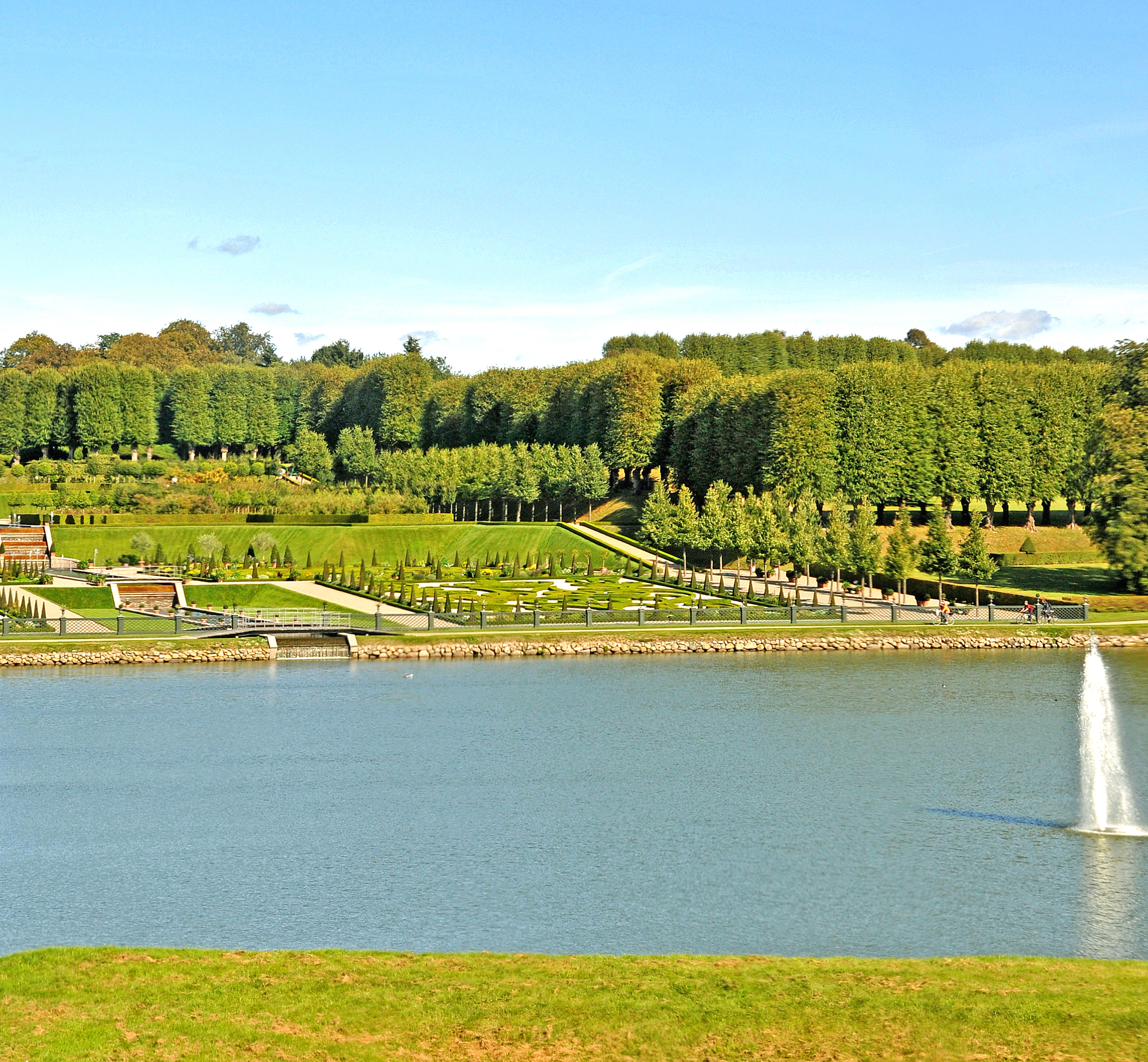
The Baroque garden viewed from the castle

The park of Frederiksborg Castle (Danish: Frederiksborg Slotshave) is located to the north and west of Frederiksborg Castle in Hillerød, Denmark. It consists of a formal Baroque garden and a Romantic landscape garden.

== History ==
=== The first gardens ===
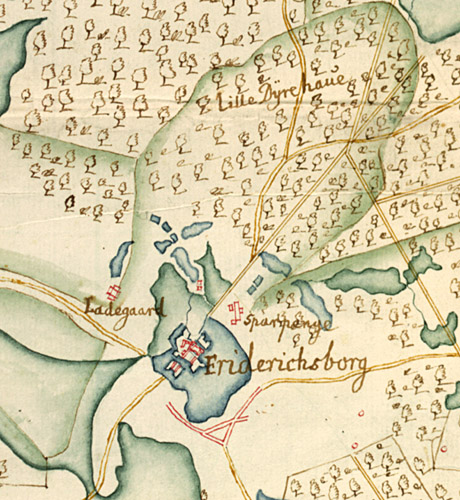
Lille Dyrehave seen on a map from about 1700

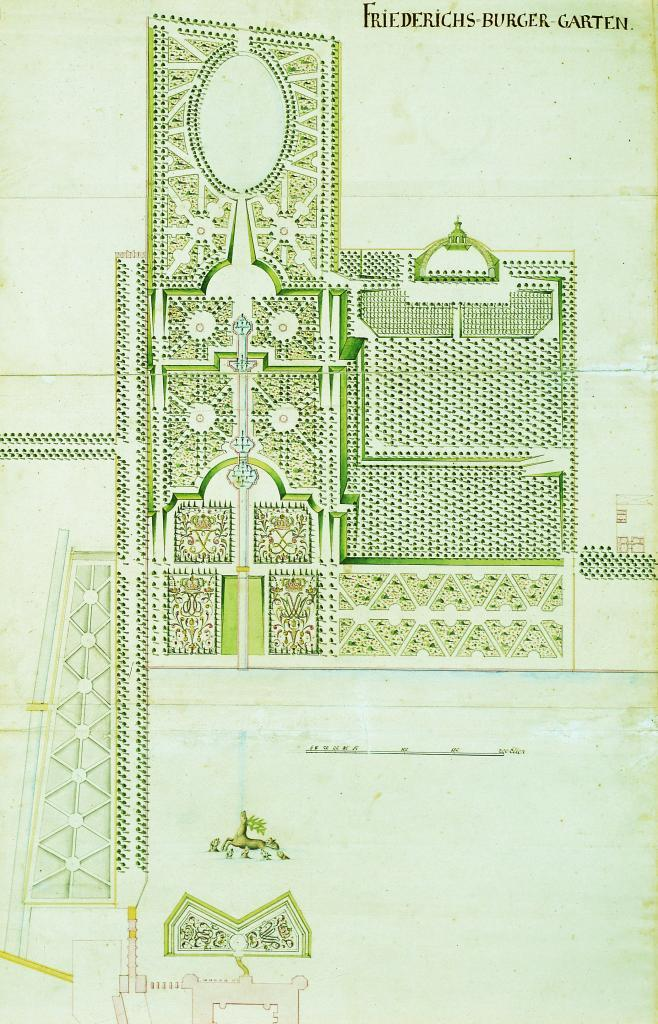
Krieger's garden plan from 1744. The Deer Fountain and the still existing isle Dronningeøen can be seen in the bottom of the picture.

An enclosed deer park for hunting was established at the same time as Christian IV's new Frederiksborg Castle. It became known as Lille Dyrehave ("Little Deer Park") when Store Dyrehave ("Large Deer Park") was created immediately to the south of the town a few years later. He also had a garden at the North Zealand residence. The Castle Lake featured a small island, Dronningeøen ("The Queen's Isle"), which was used for tea parties, as well as a fountain designed as a swimming deer chased by hunting dogs. Another feature was the pavilion Sparepenge next to the road to Fredensborg, which contained a collection of weapons. Sparepenge was pulled down in 1719, while the fountain was dismantled in the middle of the century.

=== Frederick IV's Baroque garden ===
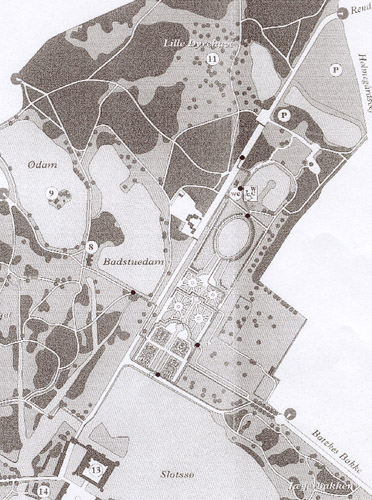
Old map of the gardens of Frederiksborg

In 1720, Johan Cornelius Krieger was charged with the design of a new garden for the castle. About 1800, Frederick VII converted the areas Lille Dyrehave and Indelukket to the west of the Baroque garden into a Romantic landscape garden. The Baroque garden fell into neglect in the late 18th century.

== Today ==
The Baroque garden was recreated in a somewhat modified form in the first half of the 1990s. A water feature cascades down the central axis of the terraced complex. The park contains a memorial to Christian Ditlev Frederik Reventlow. It was inaugurated on 15 August 1884 to mark the 100th anniversary of the agricultural reforms in which he played a central role.

The upper, northernmost part of the Baroque garden is home to Café Havehuset, a half-timbered, thatched building now used as a café. In summer, the café is open for lunch (11–3:30) Tuesday–Sunday.

== Activities ==
A tour boat operates on the lake. The building Badstueslottet is still used by the royal family in connection with hunts in the surrounding forests. The park hosts an annual garden show.

== Image gallery ==
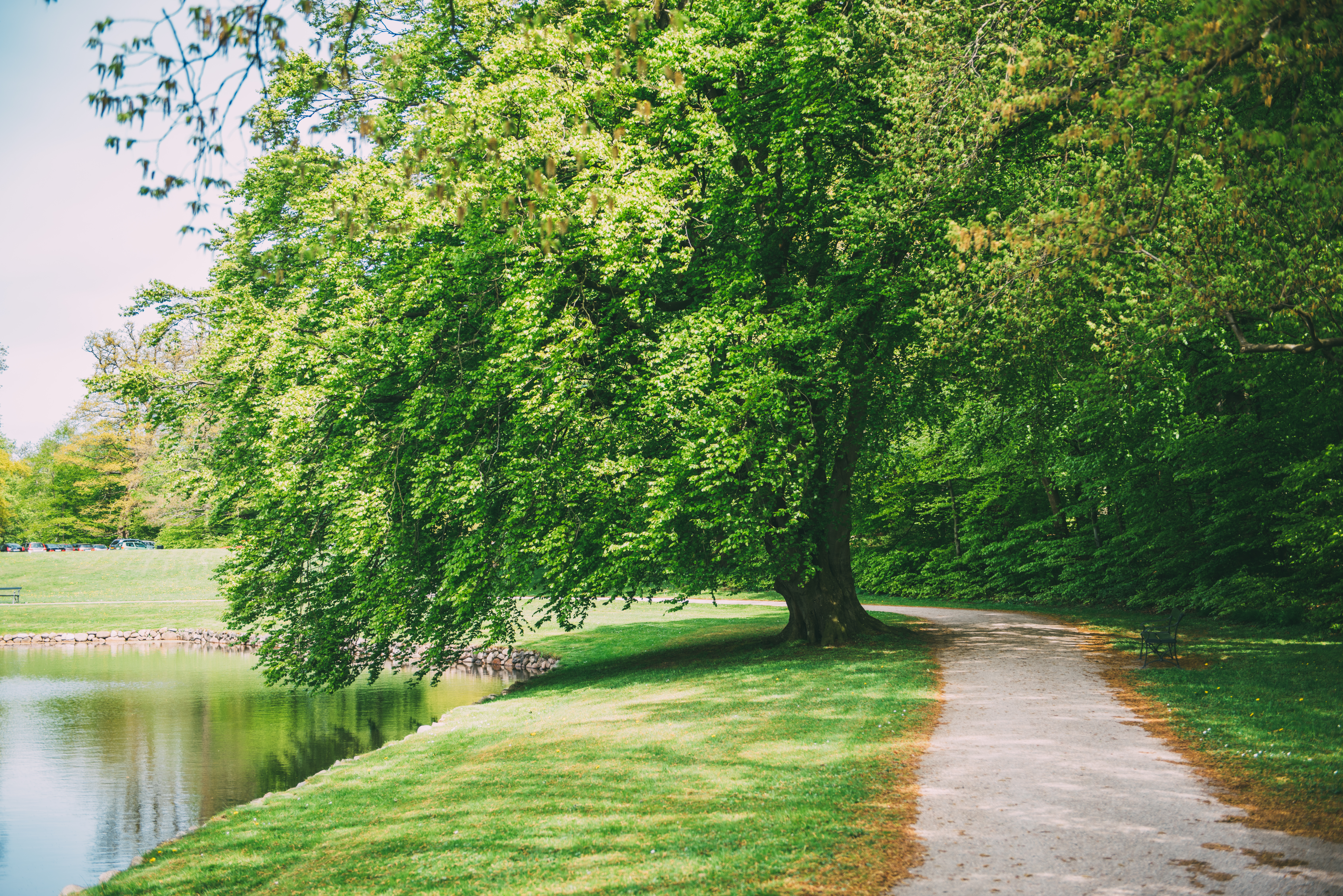
Tree in the Romantic section of the garden

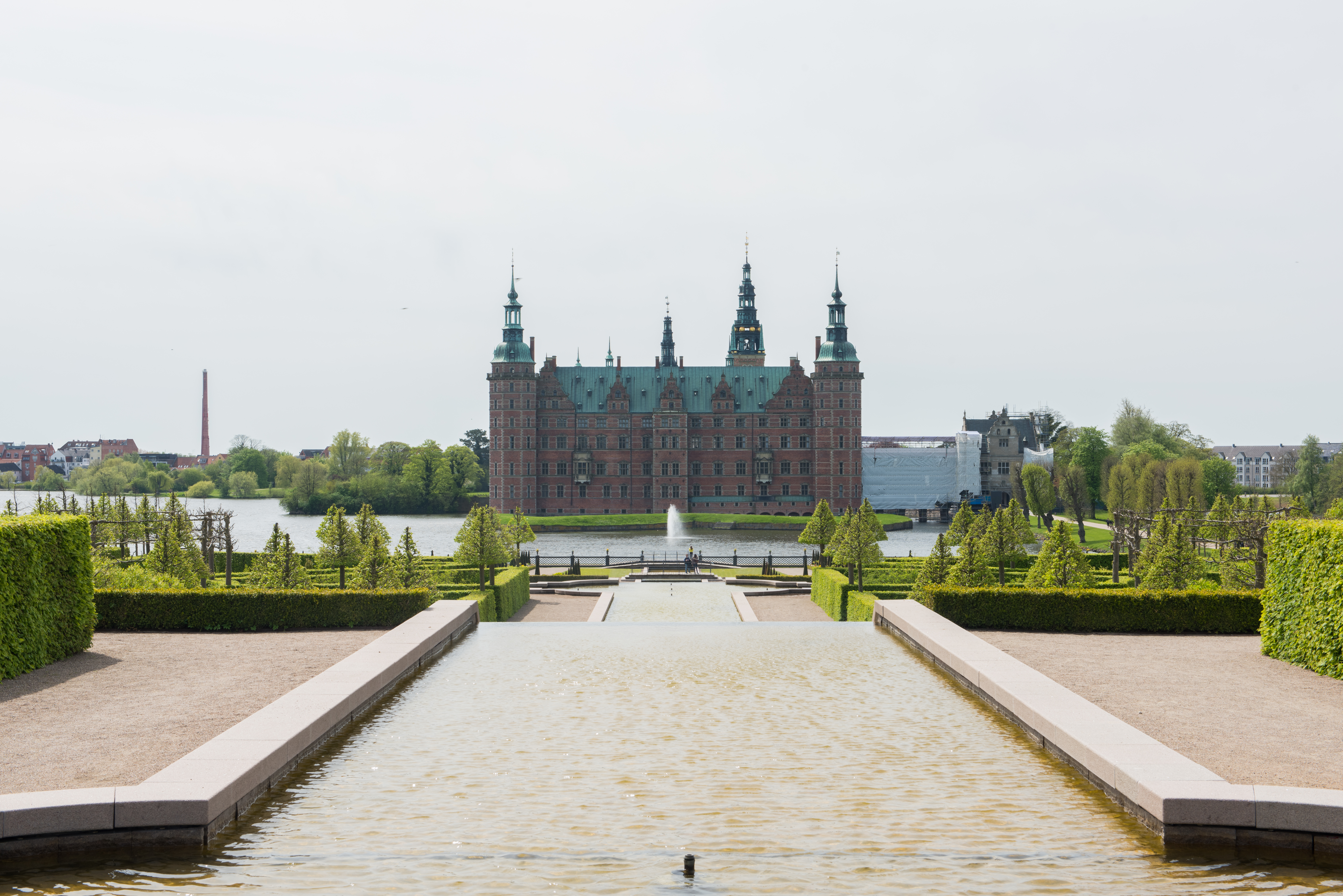
View of the castle from the Baroque garden

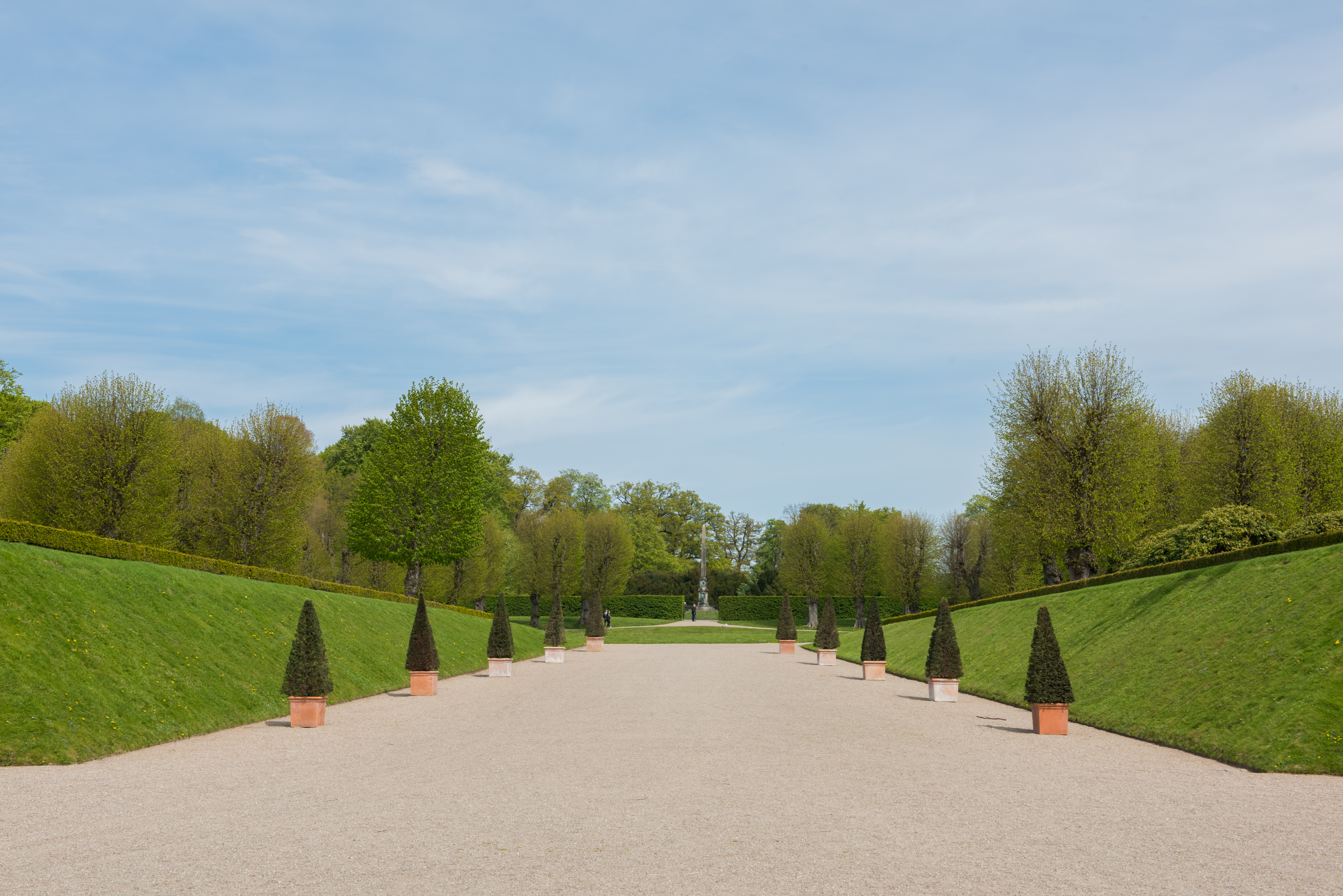
The Reventlow Column

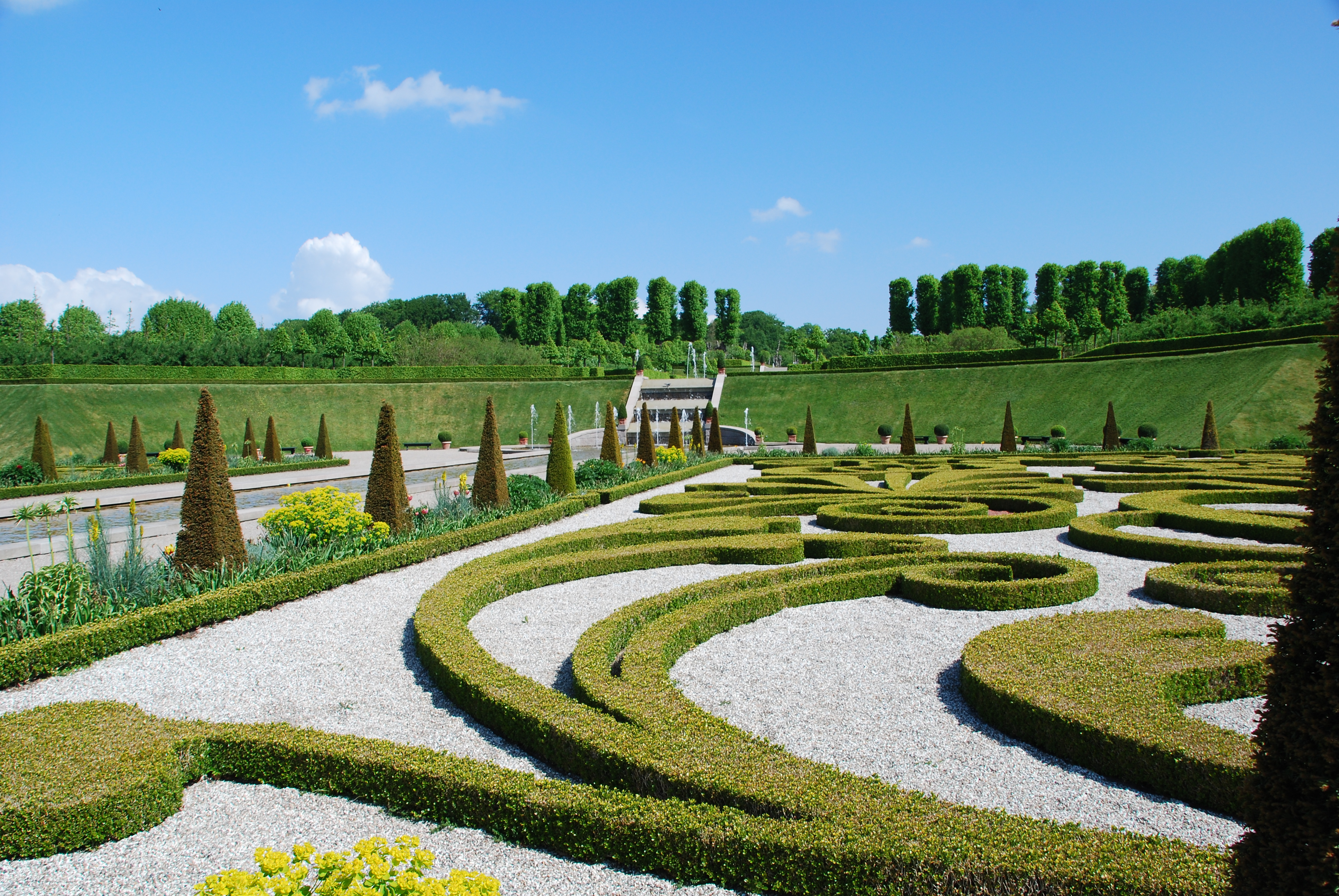
The parterre

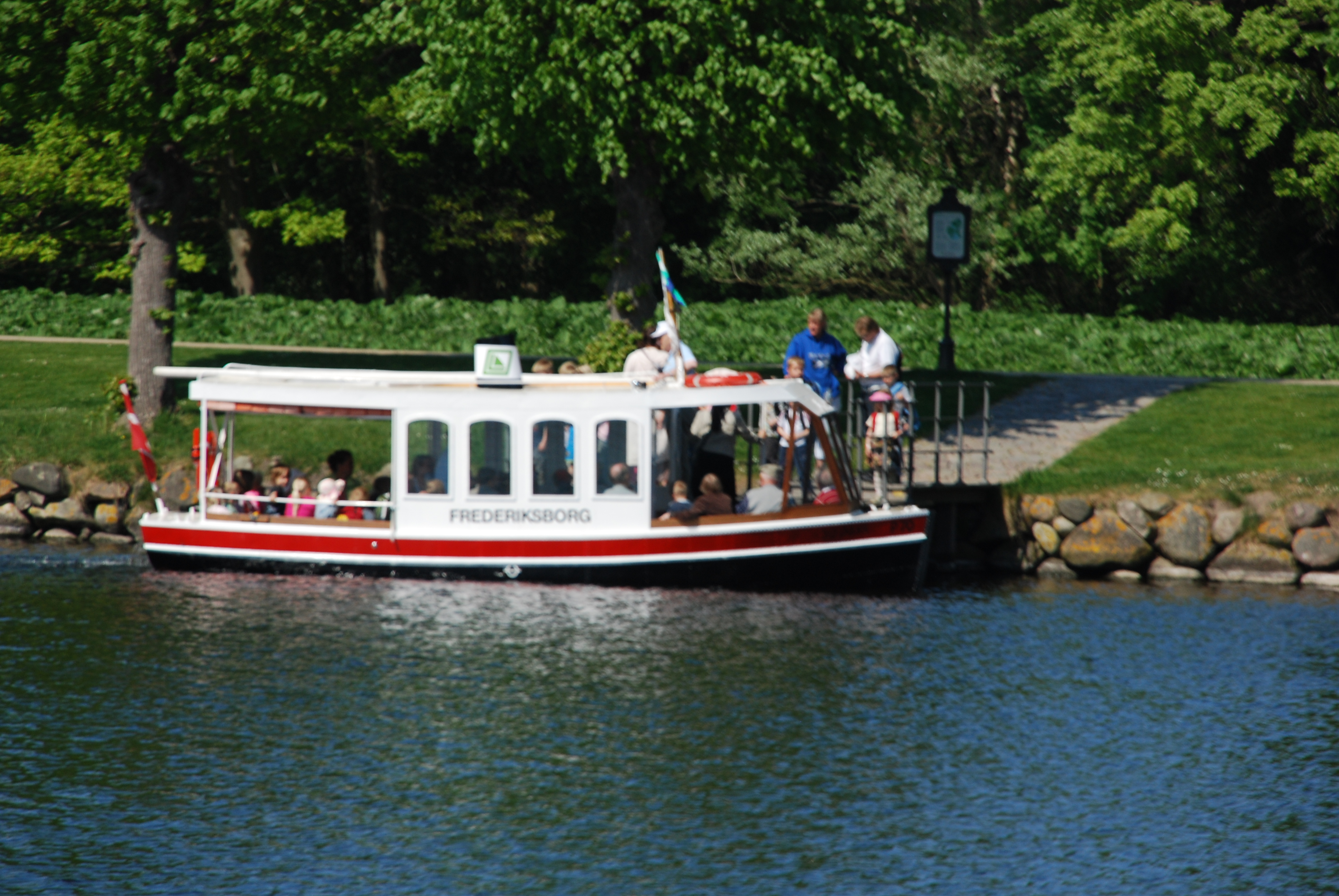
The boat service

== See also ==
- Frederiksberg Park
- Fredensborg Palace
