= Danish heraldry =

Danish heraldry has its roots in medieval times when coats of arms first appeared in Europe. Danish heraldry is a branch of the German-Nordic heraldic tradition.

== Terminology ==
=== Tinctures ===
The colors and metals used in Danish heraldry are the same as in other European heraldic traditions. The colors gules, azure and sable are most common with vert and purpure being less common and furs very rare.

Tinctures	Colours / Farver				
Escutcheons					
English	Azure	Gules	Vert	Purpure	Sable
Danish	Blå	Rød	Grøn	Purpur	Sort
	Metals / Metaller		Furs / Pelsværk		
Escutcheons					
English	Or	Argent	Ermine	Vair	Counter-ermine
Danish	Gul / guld	Hvid / sølv	Hermelin	Gråværk	Kontrahermelin

=== Charges ===
Danish heraldry use the same divisions as are common in other heraldic traditions. The most simple arms available are the division of the field by a straight line. These divisions are called skjolddelinger (lit. divisions of the shield) in Danish. Ordinaries are called heroldsfigurer (lit. herald figures) in Danish.

Divisions					
English	Party per fess	Party per pale	Party per bend sinister	Quarterly	Quarterly with a heart
Dansk	Tværdelt / vandret delt	Spaltet / lodret delt	Skrådelt fra venstre	Kvadreret	Kvadreret med midterskjold

Ordinaries / Heroldsfigurer						
English	Chief	Pale	Fess	Bend	Bend sinister	Chevron
Dansk	Skjoldhoved	Pæl	Bjælke	Skråbjælke	Venstreskråbjælke	Sparre
Ordinaries / Heroldsfigurer						
English	Cross	Saltire	Pall	Canton	Pile	Bordure
Dansk	Kors	Andreaskors	Gaffelkors	Frikvart	Kile	Bord / bræmme

Variations								
English	Barry (of eight)	Paly (of eight)	Bendy (of eight)	Chevronny	Chequy	Lozengy	Gyronny	Fretty
Dansk	(Syv gange) tværdelt	(Syv gange) spaltet	(Syv gange) skrådelt	Sparredelt	Skaktavl	Skråtavl	Geret	Fletværk

Pairs of buffalo horns (da. vesselhorn) are very common as crests in Scandinavian and German heraldry although virtually unknown in other heraldic traditions. As these horns were often drawn with an open ring at the tip, they have sometimes been altered into elephant trunks or trumpets.

== Official heraldry ==
=== State heraldry ===
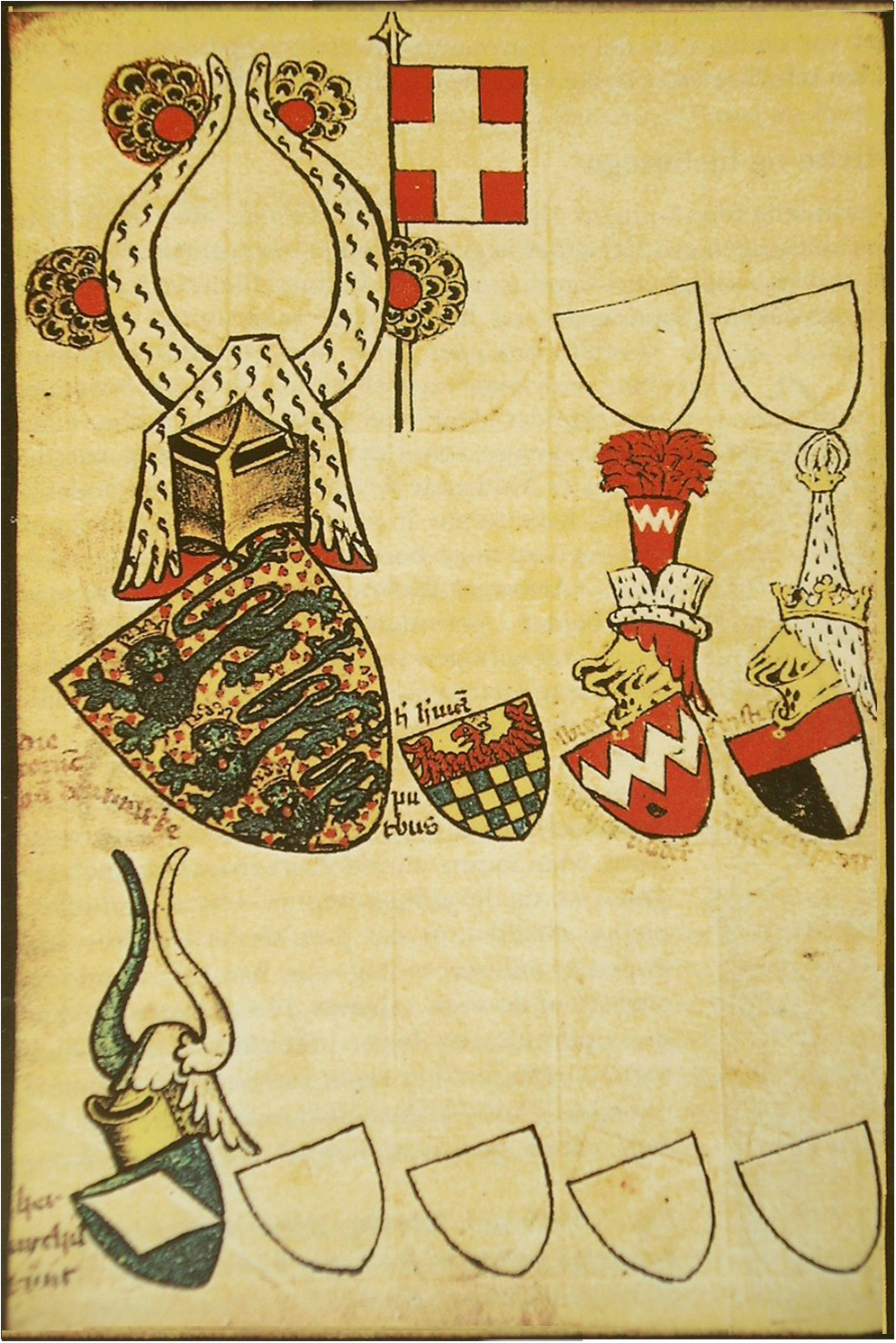
The Danish arms in the Gelre Armorial, 14th century. This is the oldest coloured image of the Dannebrog. The crest was used by Danish monarchs from the 13th century until c. 1420. The flag is not part of the crest.

The National Coat of Arms of Denmark consists of three crowned blue lions accompanied by nine red hearts, all in a golden shield. The national coat of arms was originally the coat of arms of the royal family but in time it became associated with the Danish territory. The oldest known depiction of the insignia dates from a seal used by King Canute VI c. 1194. The oldest documentation of the tinctures of the coat of arms are from a depiction in the Armorial Gelre from 1370 to 1386. From the 13th century to the 1420s the national coat of arms used a horned helmet covered with ermine fur with fans of peafowl feathers. The oldest documentation for the colours dates from c. 1270. Today the coat of arms or derivations of it is used by many state authorities. Only the Folketing use the coat of arms without the crown.

The National Coat of Arms can be found in the first and fourth quarters of the Danish Royal Coat of Arms (sometimes called the greater national coat of arms). This coat of arms is only used by the royal family.

The Danish military has a long heraldic tradition. Every regiment and naval vessel have a coat of arms.

=== Municipal heraldry ===
The coat of arms of the city Horsens is based on a medieval seal

Today most Danish municipalities have their own coat of arms. Until the municipal reform of 2007, in which the counties were abolished, all Danish counties had coats of arms. After the municipal reforms some of the new municipalities have chosen to have new coats of arms designed. Unlike the former counties, the regions are not armigerous, as they are not administered according to same law as the municipalities, and which entitles the municipalities to carry arms. The law concerning the operation of the regions makes no reference to carrying arms, and it is impossible for a region to register a coat of arms. Consequently, the regions only use logos.

The design of municipal coats of arms can vary but often the designs on medieval seals have been placed inside a shield. This has produced very complex coats of arms that do not always adhere to the rules of heraldry (e.g. the rule of tincture); the coat of arms of Aarhus is an example. There is no tradition for exterior ornaments on Danish municipal coats of arms. The most widespread tincture is azure (blue) with gules (red) being popular too.

Municipalities display their coats of arms on buildings, on stationery and on traffic signs at the limits of the municipality. Armorial banners are not commonly used.

Municipal coats of arms require approval by the National Heraldic Consultant and can be registered at the Danish Patent and Trademark Office. If a municipality chooses to use a logo instead, the approval of the National Heraldic Consultant is not required.

== Personal heraldry ==
Heraldry first appeared among the warrior class and thus became linked to nobility. But other groups of society quickly took up the heraldic tradition. The first Scandinavian burgher arms is from 1320. As the assumption of arms is free in Denmark not only noble families have coats of arms and today it is estimated that up to 80% of Danish private coats of arms are burgher arms.

During the Middle Ages most burghers and peasants had merchant's marks or house marks that were used for marking ownership and as a means of personal identification. These marks are older than heraldic tradition. They are mostly simple compositions of straight lines suitable for being scratched in wood or other materials. They have a similarity to runes and some marks consist of the initials of the owner. Later merchant's marks also incorporate Latin letters. In the beginning these marks were displayed without a shield but during the Middle Ages it became common to draw them inside a shield. Merchant's marks were used by burghers until the 18th century and for about a century longer by peasants.

Although there are no clear distinction between burgher arms and noble arms, simple coats of arms consisting only of divisions of the field are only used by ancient noble families. Often the designs of burgher arms would resemble the profession of the armiger (priests would prefer crosses and chalices, jurists would prefer scales and swords).

Previously the king tried to introduce the French system of rank helmets but these rules were largely ignored even in royal patents. The open helmet was previously associated with nobility but it is also found on burgher arms as well as there are examples of noble arms with closed helmets. Although it is perfectly legitimate for a burgher family to use an open helmet, as a rule of thumb noble families use open helmets while burgher families used closed ones. Burgher arms follow the same rules as noble arms.

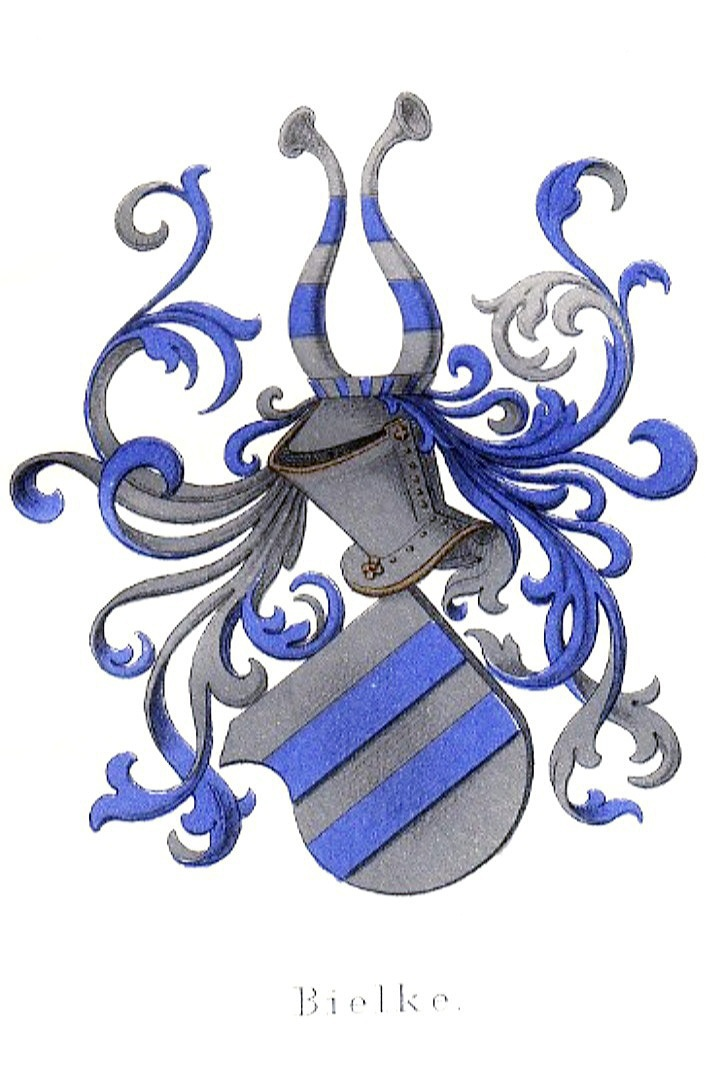
Canting coat of arms of the Bielke family (Bielke being an old spelling for bjælke, the Danish word for fess.)

Canting coats of arms have been popular in Danish heraldry for a long time; examples include a man with a tree for Holzmann (lit. "wood-man"), a troll for the Trolle family and a unicorn for Langhorn (lit. "long-horn").

Conversely some ancient noble families have coat of arms older than their family names and took a name based on their armorial bearings, for instance the Huitfeld family (named after the white field in their arms).

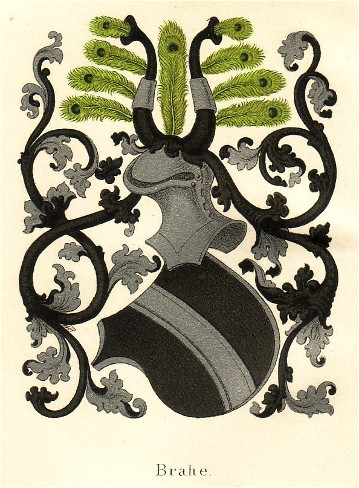
Coat of arms of the ancient noble family Brahe.

While the arms of ancient noble families often are very simple designs (e.g. sable a pale argent for the Brahe family) the arms of new noble families who got their status by royal patent are often very complex and ignores basic rules for tincture and drawing. At many times these newly created arms were equipped with several helmets and crests giving the false impression that the armiger had many notable ancestors. The heraldic achievement from this period has been criticised by several writers as a symbol of heraldic decadence.

Today modern Danish heraldry has abandoned the overly complex arms of previous periods and has returned to a more simple style closer to the medieval.

Apart from those coats of arms assumed by people with an interest in heraldry, many modern Danish coats of arms are composed for recipients of the grand cross of the Order of the Dannebrog who are entitled to hang their coats of arms in the Frederiksborg Palace church. There is also a tradition for masonic heraldry, utilising masonic symbols like the square and compass as charges. As noble titles are no longer conferred, noble arms are no longer composed.

Danish heraldry follows the German-Nordic tradition. As opposed to Gallo-British heraldry, where each individual of a family has his own coat of arms, a Danish coat of arms usually is the same for an entire family as there is no tradition of cadency marks. A specific trait of German-Nordic heraldry is that the crest usually repeats the design of the shield. Traditionally crests are not used alone. Likewise there is no tradition of badges. There is a system of coronets denoting noble rank; supporters also are reserved for high nobility.

== Regulation ==
Official Danish coats of arms are specially protected by Danish law. In general they may only be used in official duties by offices of state and municipalities. The unlawful use of an official coat of arms or other official insignia is a criminal offence under section 132 of the Danish penal code.

The National Heraldic Consultant is an officer under the Danish National Archive. His job is to ensure that official coats of arms adhere to the rules of heraldry and to approve municipal coats of arms. He has no jurisdiction over private coats of arms.

Private coats of arms are not regulated and need no official sanction. Private coats of arms can be used as trademarks and thus be protected from other commercial use. Specific renditions of coats of arms are protected by copyright law.

== See also ==
- Coat of arms of Denmark
- Flag of Denmark
- List of flags of Denmark
