= Compenius Organ =

Oldest organ in Denmark

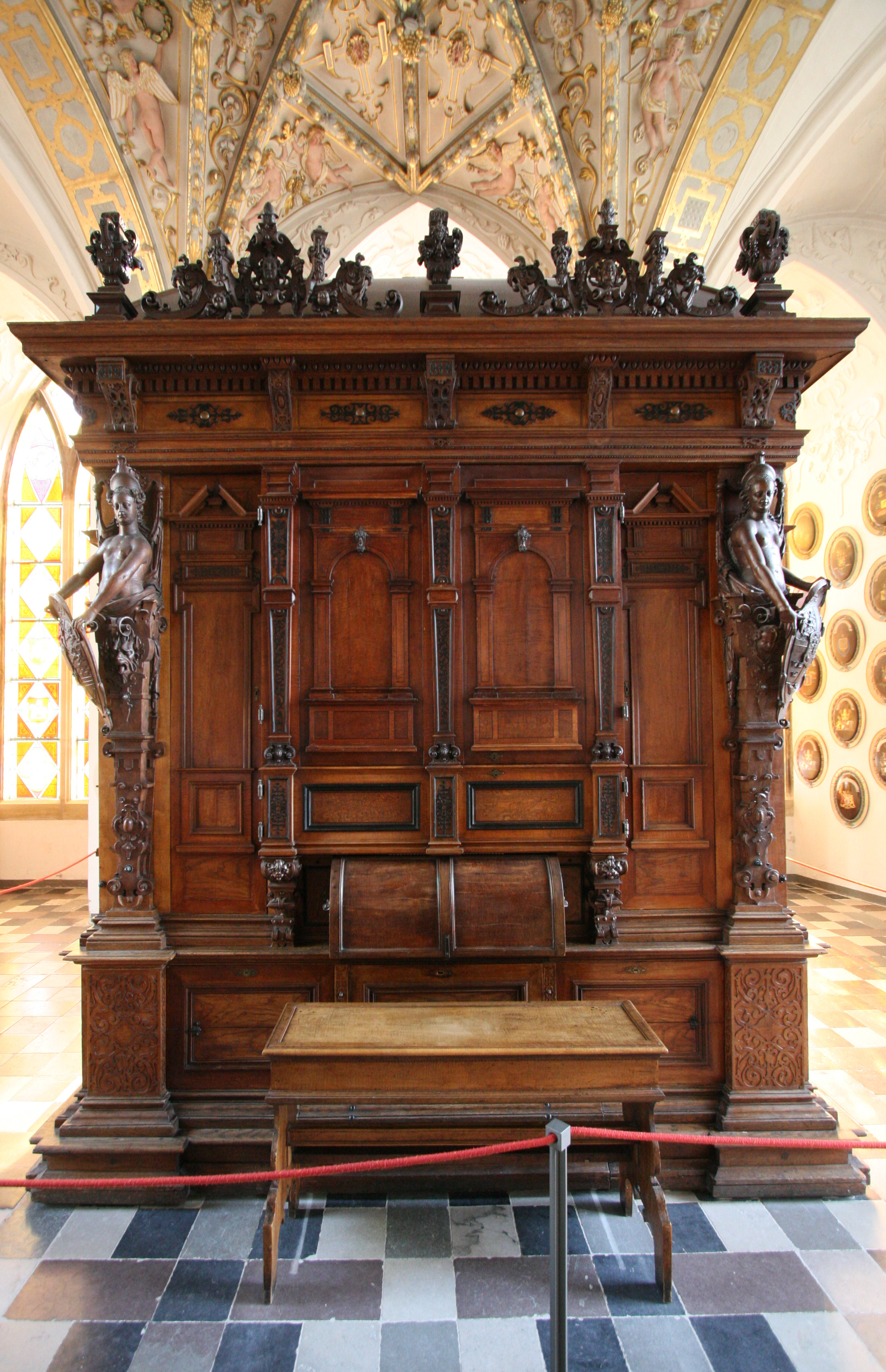
The Compenius Organ on display at Frederiksborg Castle in 2007

The Compenius Organ is one of the two primary organs in the Frederiksborg Castle Chapel in Hillerød, Denmark. It was built by Esaias Compenius in 1610 originally for Heinrich Julius, likely as a symbol of the pinnacle of good taste and refinement achieved by the Duke's Court. After a significant fire in the castle in 1859, the organ was restored by the organ company Aristide Cavaillé-Coll from Paris and is now the oldest organ in Denmark.

== History ==
=== Origins ===
The Frederiksborg Castle was built in the early decades of the 17th century as a residency for King Christian IV. While the organ was initially built for Duke Heinrich Julius of Brunswick for his castle Wolfenbüttel, it was given to Christian IV in 1617. The organ itself was built by Esaias Companius in cooperation with Michael Praetorius, the court chapel director and composer.

=== Moving ===
In 1693, King Christian V of Denmark had the organ moved from the chapel at Frederiksborg Castle into the Banqueting Hall on the top floor. C.F. Speer and H.H. Zielche, organ builder and organist respectively, were charged with the movement of the organ back into the Frederiksberg Castle chapel under Frederik VI in 1790.

=== Fire and reconstruction ===
A major fire broke out in the castle in 1859, burning large portions of the interior. The outer walls were all that remained in many places. The Chapel and the Audience Chamber survived the fire. Reconstruction of the castle began shortly after and involved a national collection to raise funds. The Compenius organ was moved back to the newly restored chapel in 1868 at the recommendation of architect Ferdinand Meldahl. This project was completed by A.H. Busch. In 1895, a major restoration of the organ was carried out by the organ company Aristide Cavaillé-Coll, and Felix Reinburg made additions to the bellows and varnished the pipes. An intense and comprehensive study was initiated in 1940 to assess the actual condition and thorough documentation of the Compenius organ. Another major restoration took place in the 1980s and the organ has been used every week following that restoration. This restoration mainly focused on fixing the bellows and reestablished the correct tuning of the instrument.

== Specifications ==
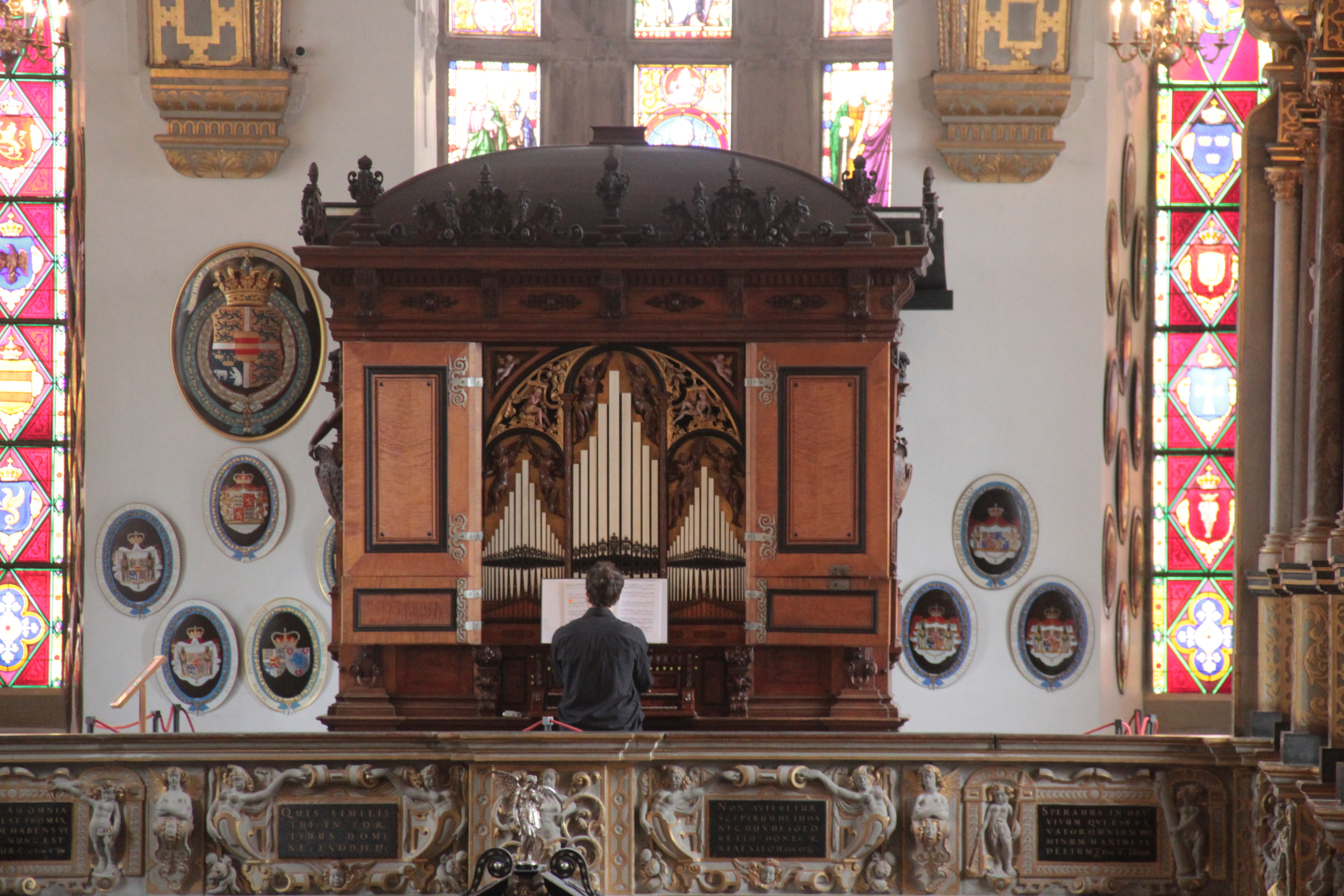
The console of the Compenius organ, opened for use.

The organ is a complex wind instrument that employs one or more keyboards to operate valves that admit air into a series of individual pipes, which make the sound. The Compenius organ is often referred to as a "character organ." Its builder was described to be more concerned with extravagant details than the traditional blend of an organ's various registers. The stops are made of silver and certain ones are meant to evoke certain "characters," such as knights, jesters, ladies, lions, owls, and goats. The organ has two manuals, with the following stops:

- Hovedvaerk (Great) - Gross Principal 8', Gross Gedact Floite 8', Klein Principal 4', Gemshorn 4', Nachthorn 4', PlockFloite 4', Gedact-Quint 3', Klein Floite 2', Rancket 16', Tremulant
- Positiv - Quinta Dehna 8', Gedactfloite 4', Gemshorn 2', NaSatt 1 ½', Zimbel, Principal Cantus 4', Blockfloite Cantus 4', Krumhorn 8', Klein Regal 4', Tremulant
- Pedal - Gedact Floiten Bass 16', Gemshorn Bass 8', Quintaden Bass 8', Nachthorn Bass 2', Pawr Floiten Bass 1', Sordunen Bass 16', Dolcian Bass 8', Regal Bass 4'

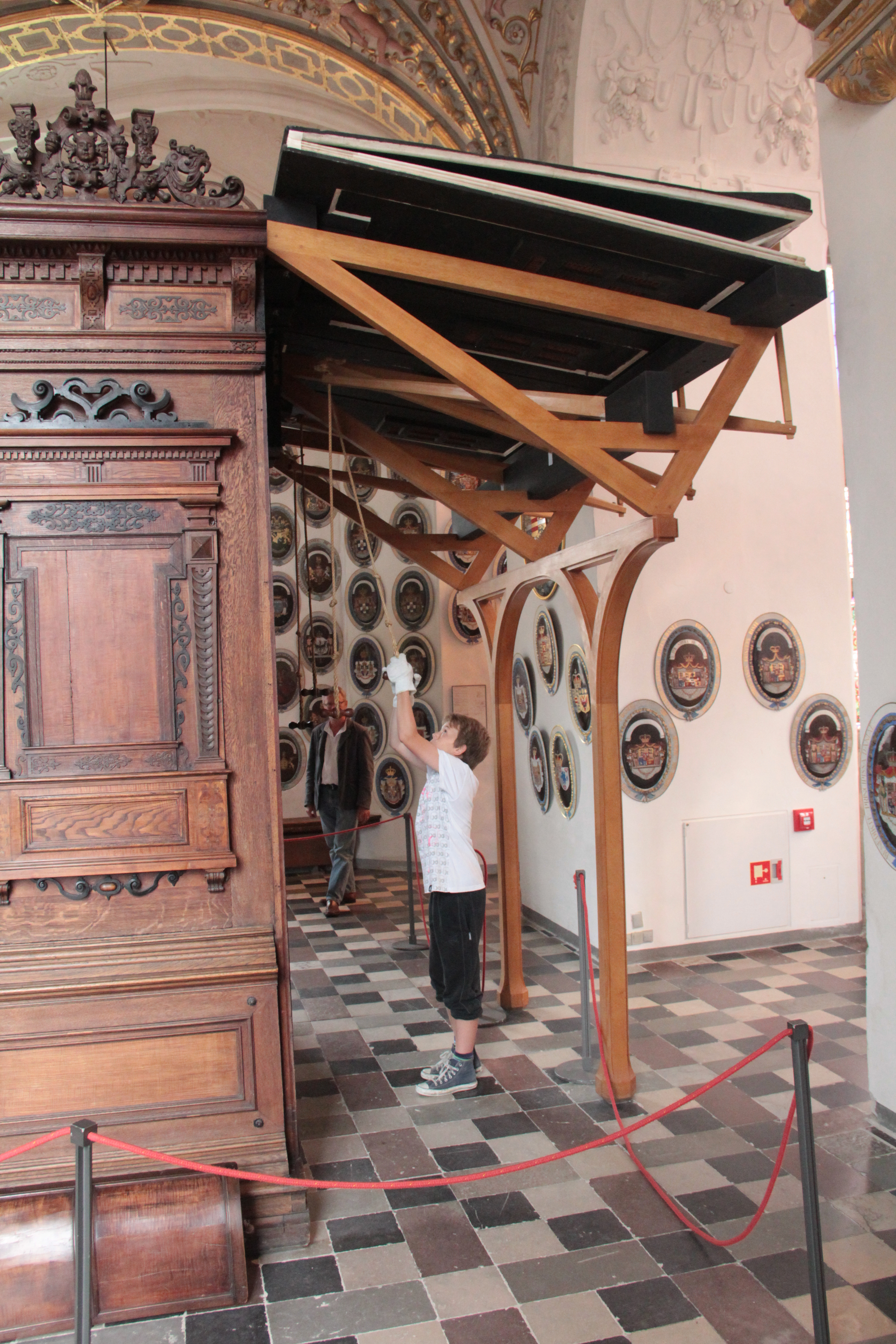
Operation of the bellows at the rear of the organ console in 2011

The organ pipes are made of exotic woods including maple, ebony, walnut, and birch wood, and many of them are inlaid with ivory. The Compenius organ has a meantone temperament which gives each tonicization a unique character. The wind chests are made of oak constructed as slider chests. The action of the organ has been constructed in the simplest possible and most space saving way. The tracker connections are made of brass threads lying in felted bearings of wood. The wind system is manipulated manually by an operator from behind the organ. The bellows are operated by a system of ropes and pulleys. The bellows above the workers are sprung open with low force, and the workers then pull the top side down to produce pressurized air. The organ is adorned with two caryatids holding the coat of arms of Duke Heinrich Julius and Duchess Elisabeth. The partitions are filled with six angels pointing towards Heaven. Also found are depictions of Mercury playing an instrument and Venus with Amor behind her. The case of the organ is built with iron handles as if built to be transported. By modern organ building standards, the Compenius organ can be seen as untraditionally vertical and dangerously undersized.

== Music of the Chapel ==
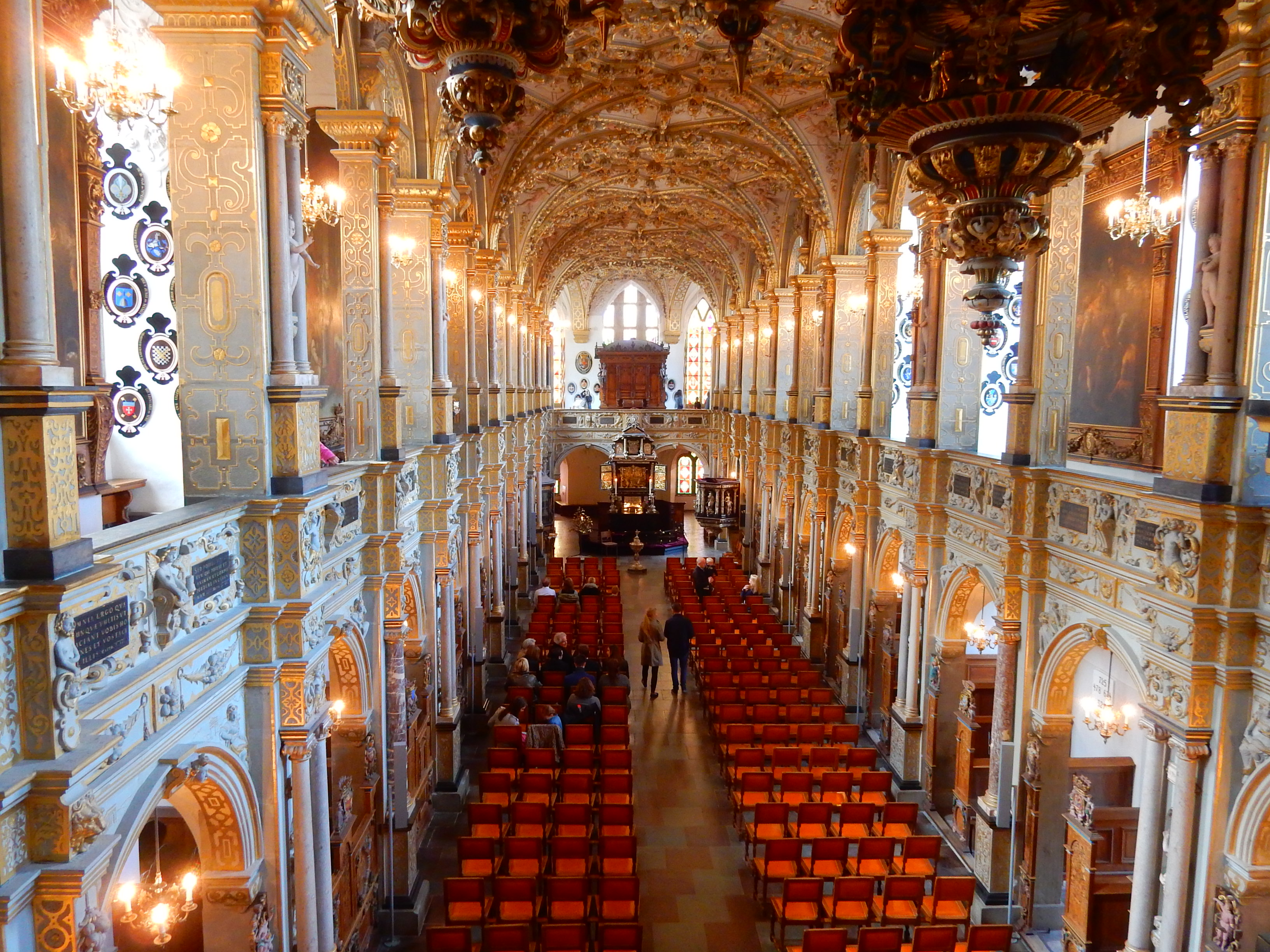
Location of the organ within the chapel of Frederiksborg Castle

The Compenius organ is a consort instrument of late Renaissance type, and Italianate in some features. It is a secular organ suited to the performance of dance tunes and song variations. Due to the pipes being made of wood, it has a softer sound compared to most organs and is pleasant to listen to even when standing next to the instrument. The Compenius organ was so unique and different from other organs that playing at banquets and major events helped distinguish Denmark. The organ was used after the first major ceremony in 1693; played by Peter Peterson Botzen, the organ served as a chamber instrument moving forward instead of a church organ. The organ came to play an important role in Baroque festivals including Frederick IV's and Queen Louise's anointment. The organ was only used on extremely rare occasions following the death of Frederik VI's Queen Dowager Marie Sophie Frederikke in 1852. In the modern day, a recital is performed on the organ every 1:30pm, which is free of charge for visitors to the museum that the castle currently acts as.
