= Ulfeldt =

Dano-German noble family

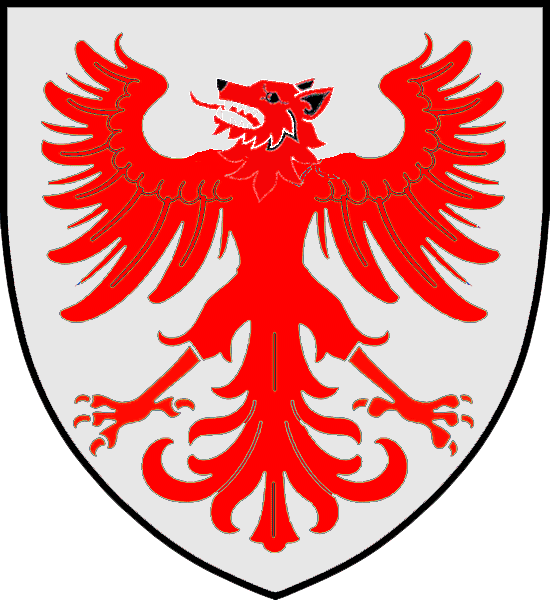
Ulfeldt family Coat of arms

The House of Ulfeldt was an old and distinguished Dano-German noble family from Funen. The oldest known members of the family lived in the 12th century. The family was represented by several royal Danish councillors of state during the 15th and 16th century, when the family was among the most influential in Denmark.

== History ==
The family was first mentioned in a written document in 1186, with the name Strange, but in the 16th century they began to call themselves Ulfeldt after the family coat of arms. Family members held the title of Count in Denmark and Imperial Count within the Holy Roman Empire, but went extinct in the male line in 1769.

== Notable members ==
- Anton Corfiz Ulfeldt (1699–1769), Austrian politician and diplomat of Danish descent
- Corfits Ulfeldt (naval officer) (1600–1644), Danish naval officer
- Corfitz Ulfeldt (1606–1664), Danish statesman, and one of the most notorious traitors in Danish history
- Ebbe Ulfeldt (1600–1670), brother of the Danish naval officer Corfits Ulfeldt, became a landscape painter in Delft
- Elisabeth Ulfeldt (1747–1791), maternal grandmother of Princess Maria Antonia of Koháry, co-founder of the House of Saxe-Coburg and Gotha-Koháry
- Hedevig Ulfeldt (1626–1678), the daughter of king Christian IV of Denmark and Kirsten Munk
- Jacob Ulfeldt (1535–1593), Danish diplomat and member of the Privy Council from 1565
- Jacob Ulfeldt (born 1567) (1567–1630), Danish diplomat and explorer and chancellor of King Christian IV of Denmark
- Leonora Christina Ulfeldt (1621–1698), the daughter of King Christian IV of Denmark and wife of Count Corfitz Ulfeldt
- Leo Ulfeldt (1651–1716), the son of Corfitz and Leonora Ulfeldt, Field marshal of the Holy Roman Empire
- Mogens Ulfeldt (1569–1616), Danish naval officer and landowner
