= Jacob Ulfeldt =

Jacob Ulfeldt may refer to:

- Jacob Ulfeldt (1535–1593), Danish diplomat and member of the Privy Council
- Jacob Ulfeldt (1567–1630), Danish chancellor of King Christian IV of Denmark, diplomat and explorer, son of the above
