= Corfitz Ulfeldt (disambiguation) =

Corfitz Ulfeldt (1606-1664), Danish statesman, son of the chancellor Jacob Ulfeldt.

Corfitz Ulfeldt may also refer to:

- Corfitz Ulfeldt (1559-1614), son of Danish diplomat Jacob Ulfeldt (1535-1593)
- Corfits Ulfeldt (naval officer) (died 1644), Danish naval officer
- Anton Corfiz Ulfeldt (1699-1769), grandson of Corfitz Ulfeldt (1606–1664), foreign minister of the Austrian Empire.
