= Mogens Ulfeldt =

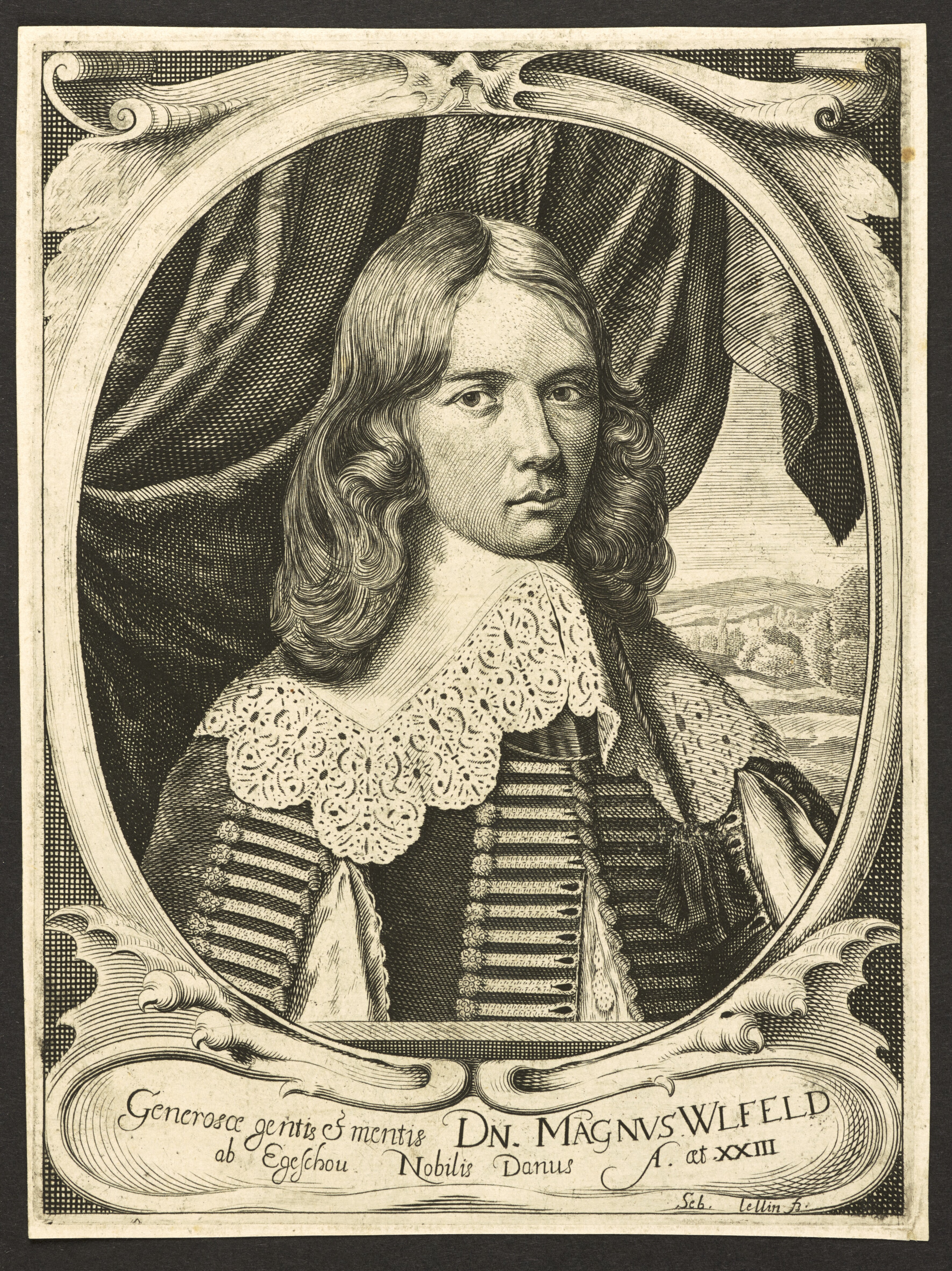
Mogens Ulfeldt

Mogens Ulfeldt (22 April 1569 – 15 June 1616) was a Royal Dano-Norwegian Navy officer and landowner. He served as Admiral of the Realm from 1610.

== Early life ==
Ulfeldt was born at Selsø Manor, the son of Jakob Ulfeldt (d. 1593) and Anne Jakobsdatter Flemming (1544–70). He was the elder brother of Jacob Ulfeldt. Mogens Ulfeldt studied in Wittenberg (1582–86), Jena (1583) and Leipzig. Soon after his return to Denmark, he went on another journey to Austria, Hungary and Italy. He studied at the universities of Padua (1587) and Siena (1588) before continuing to Malta where he participated in the Order of Malta's battles against the Turks.

== Career ==
Back in Denmark, Ulfeldt served as hofjunker in 1590–94. A favourite of the young Christian IV, in 1599 he was appointed vice captain of the king's ship on an expedition to the Arctic Sea. The following year, he was granted Kronborg as a fief. In 1604, Kronborg was exchanged for Kristianopel and Sølvitsborg.

In 1602, Ulfeldt was appointed admiral of a fleet to Narva. In 1606, with the title of vice admiral, he participated on the king's voyage to England. In 1609–10, he was commander of the flotilla that defended the Danish dominium maris baltici and successfully terminated the Swedish blockade of Riga.

In March 1610, Ulfeldt was made a member of the Privy Council and appointed an Admiral of the Realm. He was granted Villands Herred as a replacement of his earlier fiefs in the same year.

In February 1611, he was probably part of the Privy Council majority that condoled Christian IV's decision to declare war against Sweden. In March through September, he served as commander of a Danish fleet that operated at Kalmar and Gotland. In June 1612, Ulfeldt and Gert Rantzau gained control of Öland. In the autumn, he headed the Danish fleet under Christian IV's command. In late 1612, he acquired the fief of Tranekær in exchange for Villands Herred.

== Property ==
Ulfeldt inherited Selsø, Tvis Kloster and Krogsdal in Western Jutland.

== Personal life ==
On 7 August 1597, Ulfeldt was married to Anne Munk, a daughter of Christen Munk (c. 1520–79) and Dorthe Gyldenstierne (d. 1583). They had four children (1616–24): Corfitz Ulfeldt, Jacob Ulfeldt, Christian Ulfeldt and Anne Ulfeldt.

An "action by his wife" prompted Ulfeldt to imprison her at Selsø Castle, with the king's permission. She was not given her full freedom until 1624. Ulfeldt fell ill and died in 1616.
