= St. Catherine's Priory, Roskilde =

Dominican priory in Roskilde, Denmark

Coordinates: 55°38′31″N 12°05′11″E

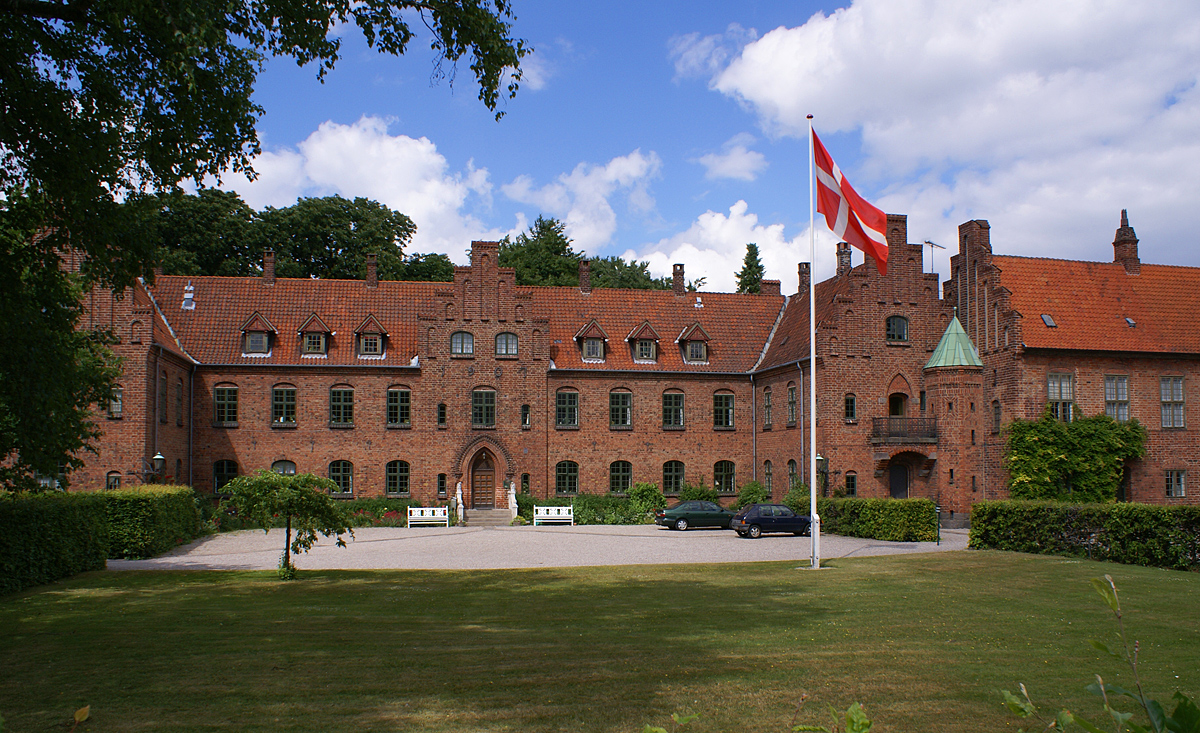
Roskilde Priory, Roskilde

St. Catherine's Priory, Roskilde (Roskilde Kloster) was a Danish priory of Dominican friars located in Roskilde. It was established in 1231 and dissolved during the Reformation. In 1699, the private house which replaced the Priory became the Lutheran Roskilde Adelige Jomfrukloster (now known as Roskilde Kloster), a women's collegiate foundation.

Roskilde was also the site of St. Agnes' Priory, Roskilde (Skt. Agnete Kloster) which was a separate convent for women of the Dominican Order. It was in operation from 1264 until it was taken over by the crown and closed down at the time of the Danish Reformation.

== St. Catherine's Priory ==
The Dominicans established St. Catherine's Priory in Roskilde (the ancient capital of Denmark and the seat of the most important Danish diocese, the Diocese of Roskilde, or Zealand) in 1231. Source material for the Dominican priory in Roskilde is sparse, but it is clear that Roskilde ranked second only to Lund among the Dominican houses of Scandinavia during the Middle Ages. On several occasions the head of the regional order, the prior provincial, was elected from Roskilde.

Only a few of the friars are named. Friar Bo is named in a 1267 letter connected with the conflict between Archbishop Jacob Erlandsen and King Valdemar. Friar Bo was excommunicated for violating the decree of interdict laid down by the archbishop. Prior Petrus Brackæ gave all his worldly possessions to Sorø Abbey in 1312 and then became a Dominican at Roskilde. Perhaps the most notable Dominican friar of Roskilde was Johan Nyborg who was made Bishop of the See of Roskilde in 1330.

A notable patron of the Dominican friars of Roskilde was Dowager Duchess Ingeborg (1301–c.1360), mother of King Magnus IV of Sweden and VII of Norway, who made them frequent gifts from at least 1330 onwards, and who also remembered them in her will.

The main work of the friars was to preach and teach, so it has been supposed that a school of some sort formed part of the duties of the priory at Roskilde, perhaps in conjunction with the town's cathedral school. The Black Friars, as they were known, were a mendicant order, which means that they relied on donations to keep food on the table, candles burning, and the work of the friars. The Roskilde friars forged over time a close connection with the cathedral chapter in the city, which to an extent insulated them from the ebb and flow of events in Denmark's turbulent Middle Ages. After St. Agnes' priory for Dominican nuns was built, the friars also became responsible for the priestly functions required there.

Few details are known of the priory buildings, which were sited a little to the north of the modern Roskilde Kloster, but they consisted of a brick church consecrated to Saint Catherine in 1254, dormitory, scriptorium, refectory and a garden, which included an apple orchard. To the north of the buildings the friars owned a spring and by 1329 dams had been constructed to build at least one mill. The priory also owned at least one farm outside Roskilde, at Slagelse.

=== Dissolution ===
The Reformation brought the St. Catherine's Priory at Roskilde to an end. In 1532 the friary sold the farm at Slagelse because of the community's great need. In 1536 Denmark became officially Lutheran, rejecting all Catholic institutions and most traditions. Christian III, who with many Danes opposed the constant appeal for funds by the mendicant orders, commanded the closure of the priory in 1537 and the Dominican friars were turned out. Many simply put off their habits and became residents of Roskilde. Others fled Denmark south to Germany in the search for new religious houses where they could live their lives without interference.

The friary including the church was demolished in 1557 by the town of Roskilde on direct orders from the king. The site lay vacant until 1565 when a house was built on the site by local nobleman Mogens Godske, which he called "Black Brothers Farm" (Sortebrødregård) after the Dominicans who had occupied the site for hundreds of years. The nunnery, which had become crown property, was levelled in 1579, and the brick taken away with royal permission.

== Roskilde Adelige Jomfrukloster ==
Godske's mansion house was enlarged several times and in 1699 was made into a Lutheran collegiate foundation for unmarried noblewomen, the Roskilde Adelige Jomfrukloster, upon the initiative of nobleman Berte Skeel, owner of Selsø (Selsø Slot).

It was amalgamated in 1974 with an equivalent institution in Odense, the Odense Adelige Jomfrukloster, founded in 1716 by Karen Brahe, and is now known simply as Roskilde Kloster.
