= Andreas von Barby =

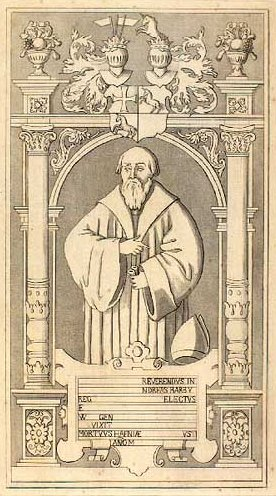
Andreas von Barby

Andreas von Barby (24 July 1508 - 3 August 1559) was a German-born nobleman in Danish service who served as "German Chancellor" (de facto Foreign Minister) under Christian III. He owned Selsø Manor on the Hornsherred peninsula.

== Early life and education ==
Barby was the illegitimate son of Nicolaus von Barby of Loburg and Isterlin (died 1524). His father served as district governor (amtmand) of Gommern. Barby was educated under Hieronymus Schurff in Wittenberg.

== Career ==
Barby began to work for Duke Magnus I, Duke of Saxe-Lauenburg, Christian III's father-in-law, who recommended him to the Danish king. In 1541, Christian II used him in the negotiations with the Pommeranian dukes. In February 1542, he was given a three-year contract as a royal messenger with an annual salary of 100 guilders. In November 1543, he succeeded Georg Cörper as leader of Tyske Kancelli. He was in this connection granted St. Lawrence's Chapel and the Provostry of Roskilde as fiefs in addition to an annual salary of 40 guilders. He was later granted the Provostry of Viborg as payment instead of the 40 guilders. In June 1545, he was also granted St. Claire's Chapel in Roskilde as a fief. In the verdict over Peder Oxe from June 1558 as well as at Christian III's funeral (by Jacob Bording), Barby is referred to as "German Chancellor" (de facto Foreign Minister) but it is unclear if he was ever officially appointed as such.

In the later 1550s, Barby seems to have maintained a close relationship with the circle around Johann Friis and Peder Oxe. He was later on more closely affiliated with the Privy Council's conservative alliance around Mogens Gyldenstierne. In 1559, he recommended Frederick II to join the planned campaign against Ditmarsken.

== Property ==
In 1547–48, Christian III granted him Faurholm at Gillerød. He was involved in a bitter boundary dispute with Herluf Trolle and ended up selling the estate for 17,000 daler to Peder Oxe. That same year he was naturalized as a Danish nobleman.

He was in 1556 also granted Selsø and was the following year granted royal permission to turn it into a stamhus (family trust) for his nephew Hans von Barby.

== Personal life and legacy ==
Andreas von Barby died in 1559 and is buried in Roskilde Cathedral. Hans von Barby sold Selsø shortly after his uncle's death.
