= Barony of Holckenhavn =

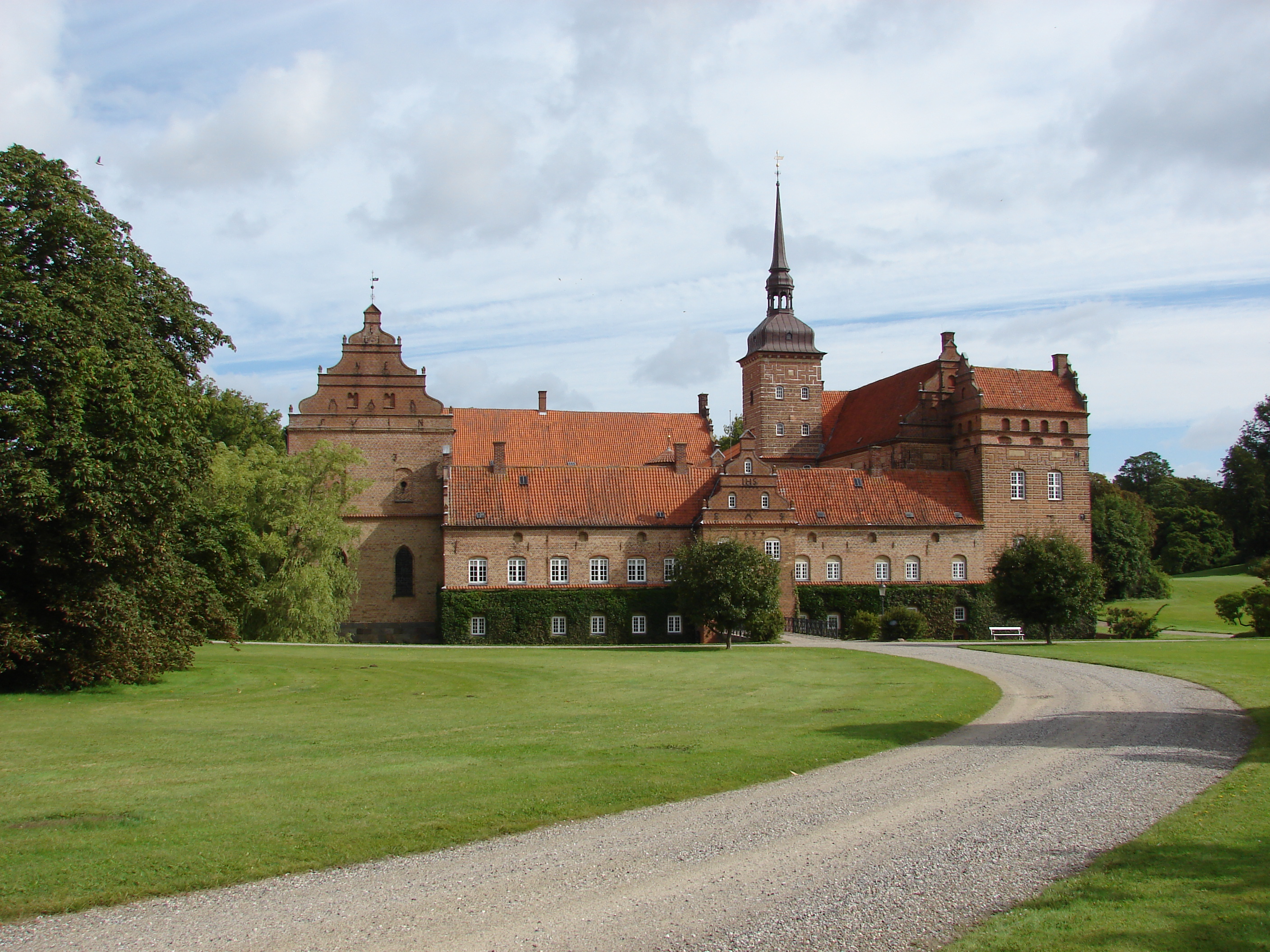
- Holckenhavn Castle, photographed in 2011.
- Creation date: 4 October 1671
- Created by: Christian V
- First holder: Eiler Holck
- Last holder: Mogens Conrad Christian Holck
- Extinction date: 1921
- Seat: Holckenhavn Castle

The Barony of Holckenhavn was a Danish majorat on the island of Funen, which existed from 1671 to 1921.

== History ==
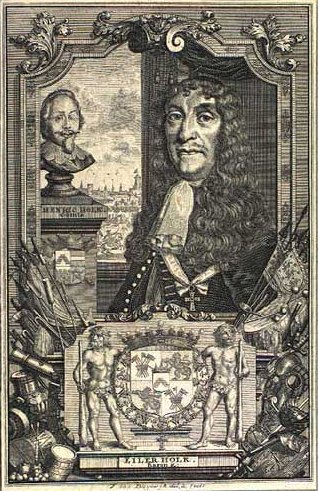
Eiler Holck.

The Barony of Holckenhavn was established on 4 October 1671 by King Christian V of Denmark for Eiler Holck, a member of the noble family of Holck. It consisted of the manor of Holckenhavn. The holder of the barony carried the title of enfeoffed baron (Danish: lensbaron).

The county was inherited by members of the Holck family during its entire existence. It was dissolved in 1921.

== Notes and references ==
=== Bibliography ===
- Danmarks Adels Aarbog 1925 (PDF) (in Danish). Copenhagen: J.H. Schultz. 1925. p. 448-456.
- Bobé, Louis; Graae, Gustav; Jürgensen West, Frederik (1916). Danske Len (PDF) (in Danish). Copenhagen: J.H. Schultz.
