= Eiler Holck =

Danish nobleman and military officer

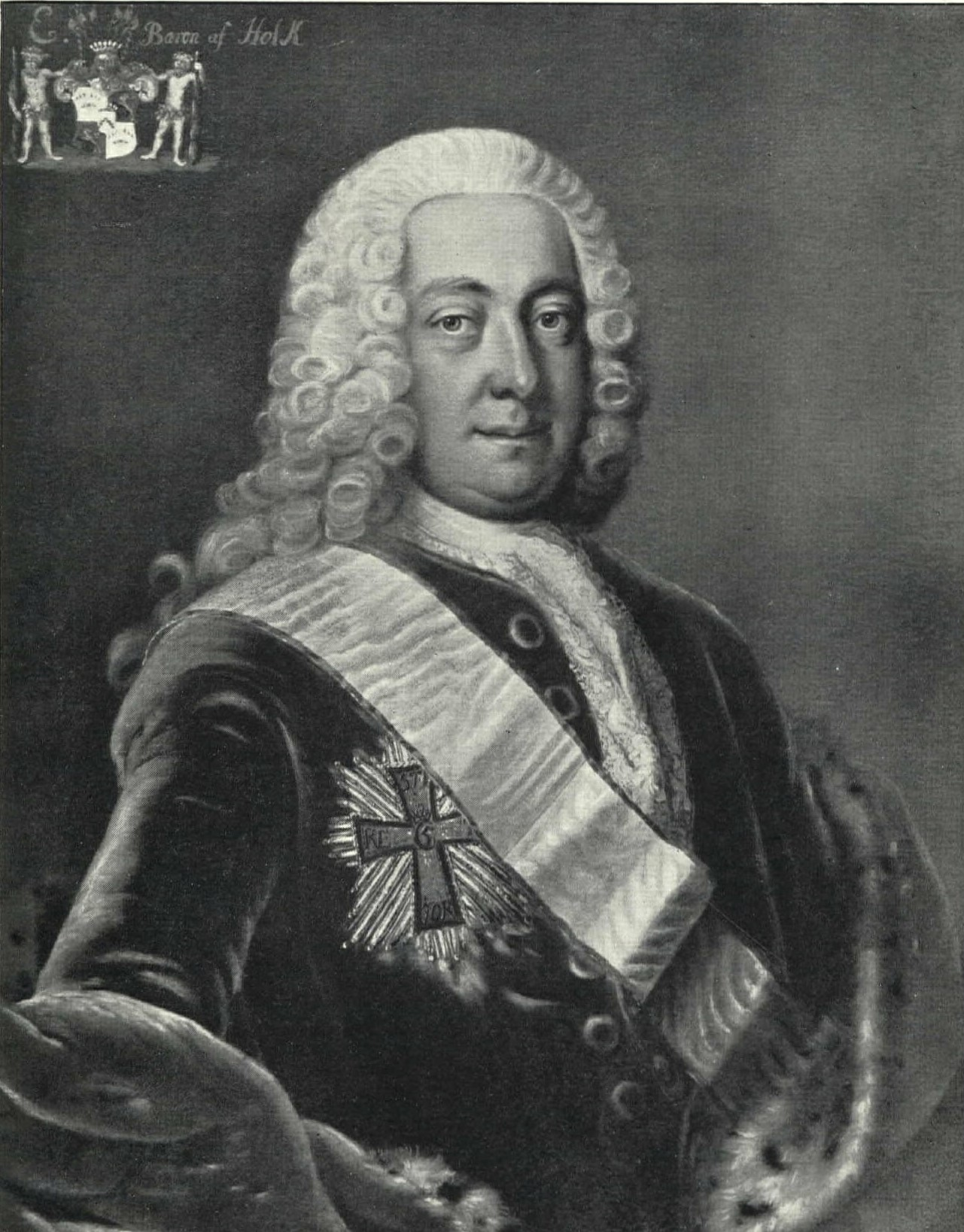
Portrait by Johann Salomon Wahl, 1740

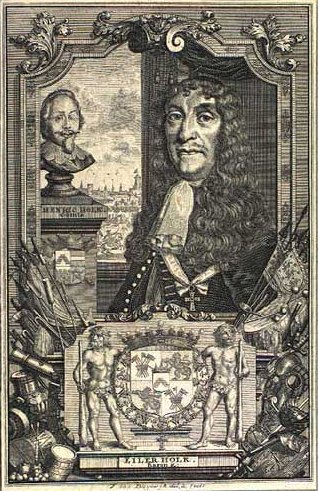
Eiler Holck

Eiler Holck, 1st Baron of Holckenhavn (4 June 1627 – 28 June 1696) was a Danish nobleman and military officer, from 1671 with the title of baron.

== Biography ==
Holck participated in the fighting at Frederiksodde in the Second Northern War and in the defense of Copenhagen.

Despite being of an old Danish noble family, he supported the introduction of absolutism and was rewarded with high offices. He was appointed commandant of Kronborg and county governor (da. Amtmand) of the County of Kronborg (da. Kronborg Amt). In 1664 he was promoted to major general and became a member of the War Council (da. Krigskollegiet).

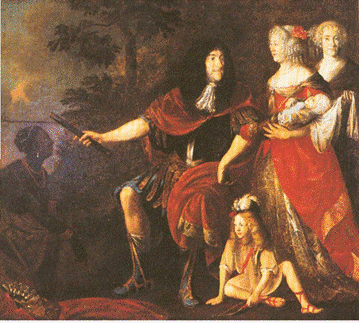
Eiler Holck with family.

In 1672 he acquired Ellensborg, which had been confiscated by the Crown after Corfitz Ulfeldt fell into disfavour, and founded the Barony of Holckenhavn. From 1675 his political career waned.

He died at Holckenhavn Castle and is buried at Vindinge Church.
