= Selsø =

Manor house in Frederikssund Municipality, Denmark

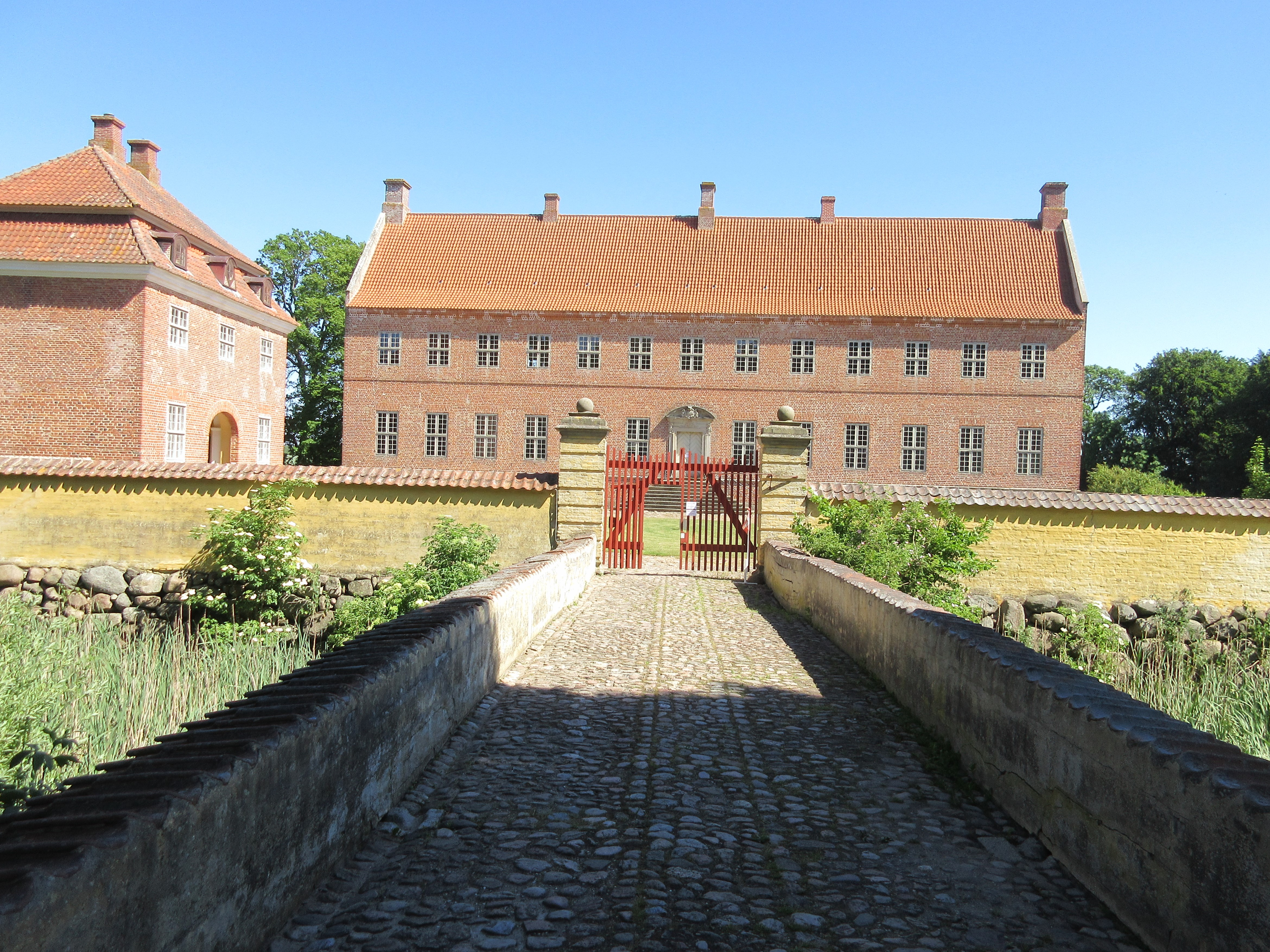
- The main building
- Interactive map of the Selsø area

General information
- Architectural style: Baroque
- Location: Selsøvej, Denmark
- Coordinates: 55°44′28″N 12°00′38″E
- Completed: 1576
- Renovated: 1734

Selsø (Selsø Slot) is a historic manor house located near Skibby, on the Hornsherred peninsula, Frederikssund Municipality, some 50 km (31 mi) west of Copenhagen, Denmark. The estate traces its history back to the 13th century. The current main building dates from 1576 but was renovated in the Baroque style in 1734. The estate has been owned by the Scheel-Plessen family since 1721 but the recently restored main building and its immediate surroundings have been ceded to a self-owning foundation. The building is now operated as a museum and is also used as a venue for concerts and other events. The knight's hall is decorated with paintings by Hendrick Krock. The main building, a gatehouse from 1734 and the east wing of the adjacent home farm (Avlsgården) were listed on the Danish registry of protected buildings and places in 1918.

== History ==
=== Early history ===
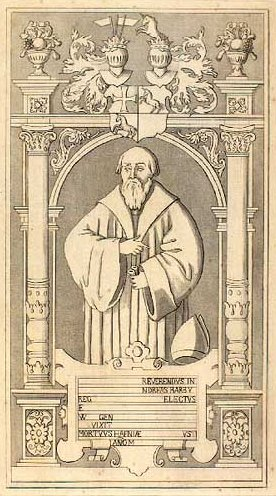
Andreas von Barby

Selsø is first mentioned in 1288 when bishop Ingvar of Roskilde granted it to Jens Grand for life. On Grand's death in 1300, Selsø reverted to the Bishopric of Roskilde. The original Selsø was probably a defensive building located close to Selsø Church, overlooking the lake which was then part of Roskilde Fjord.

Selsø was together with other property of the Catholic Church confiscated by the Crown during the Reformation. In 1756, Christian III ceded the estate to Andreas von Barby, one of his favourites, who had already been granted a number of fiefs. Barby was the following year granted royal permission to turn the estate into a stamhus for his nephew Hans von Barby. Hans von Barby had no interest in the Danish estate and sold it when his uncle died two years later.

=== Ulfeldt family ===
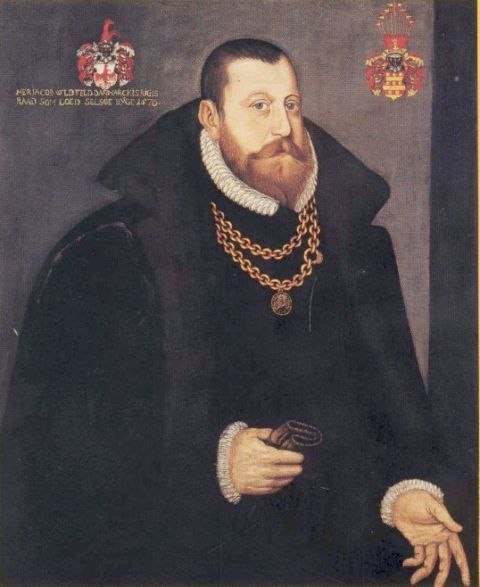
Corfitz Knudsen Ulfeldt

The new owner of the estate was Corfitz Knudsen Ulfeldt. He was already the owner of Ulfeldtsholm at Nyborg on the island of Funen and had also been granted a number of royal fiefs. He was now also granted Eskildsø in Roskilde Fjord, initially as a fief but after a while as his property in exchange for other land.

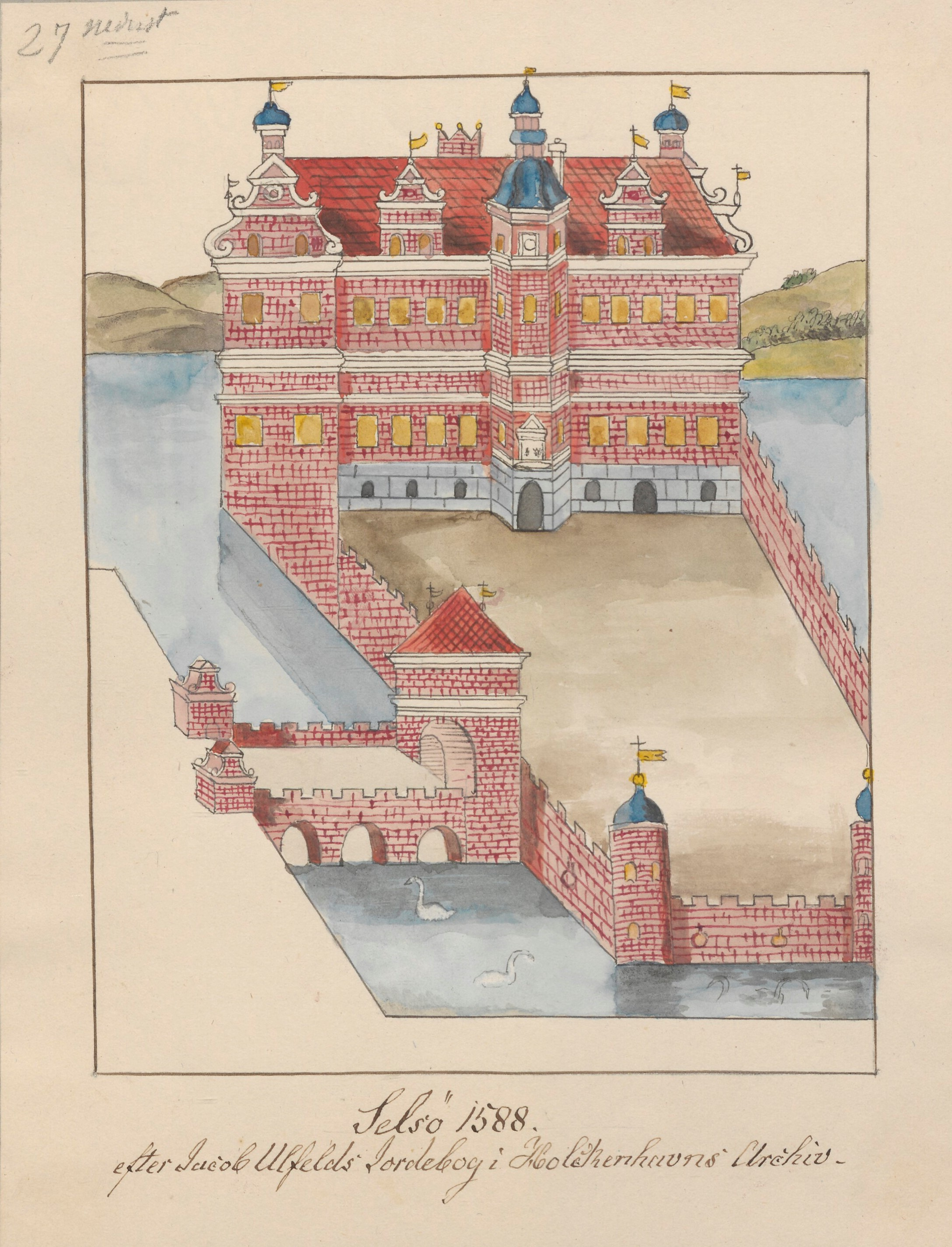
Selsø as Johann Gottfried Burman Becker believed it appeared in 1588

In 1562, Ulfeldt was sent by the king on a diplomatic mission to Stockholm. He fell seriously ill on the way home, and died at Hillerødsholm in 1563. He had never married, and Selsø and his other estates were therefore passed to his brother Jacob Ulfeldt. The Selsø estate comprised 50 farms, six village houses without land, a windmill and a watermill.

Jacob Ulfeldt completed a new main building in 1576, using half a million bricks from the abandoned St. Clare's Priory in Roskilde. The new building was apparently designed by a Dutch architect, most likely Hans Hendrik van Paesschen (c. 1510–1582).

After Jacob Ulfeldt's death, Selsø was handed down to his son Mogens Ulfeldt. He was appointed as Admiral of the Realm in 1610. An action committed by his wife, Anne Munk, prompted him with the king's permission to imprison her at Selsø and her full freedom was not restored until 1624.

On Mogens Ulfeldt's death in 1616, Selsø was handed down to their four children.

=== Changing owners, 1624–1720 ===
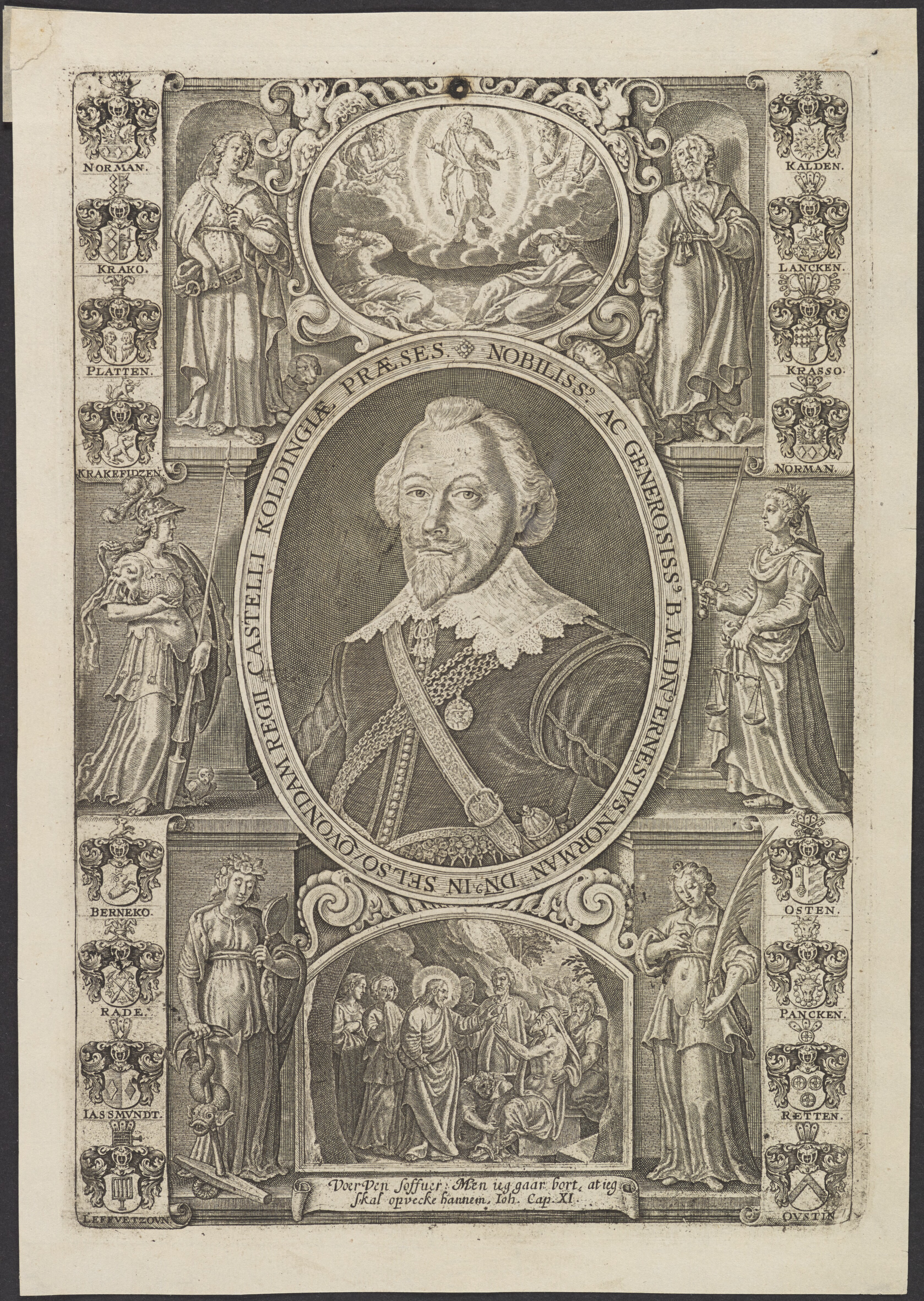
Nobiliss ac Generosiss ... Ernestus Norman

In 1624, King Christian IV wrote to the three Ulfeldt brothers, encouraging them to travel abroad. In order to cover travel expenses, they had to sell Selsø.

The buyer was Ernst Normand, Christian IV's former servant, who had already acquired the estate Palsgård in Jutland through his marriage to Ingeborg Arenfeldt. On his widow's death, Pelsgaard was passed down to their daughter while Selsø was sold to Joachim Frederik Pentz.

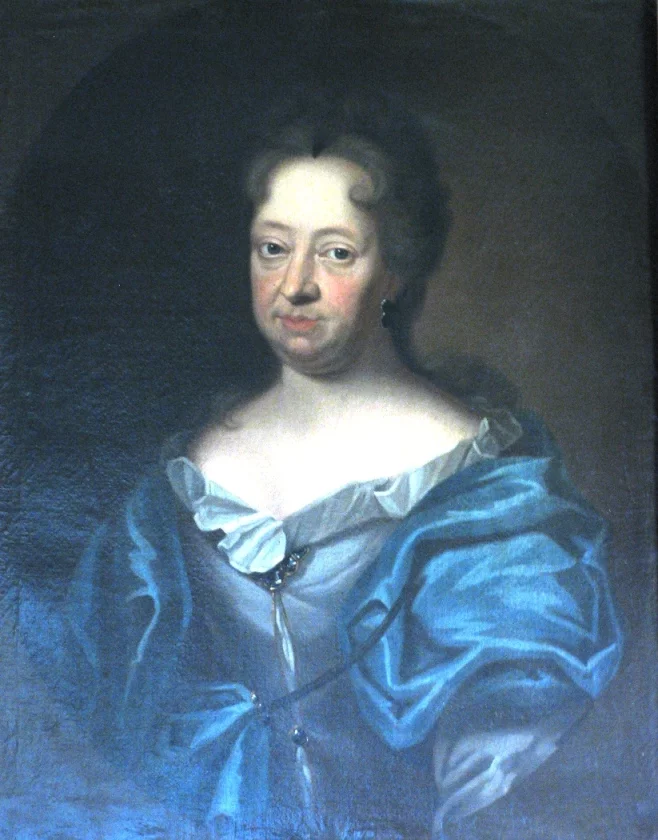
Berte Skeel

in 1669, Selsø was ceded by Pentz to Erik Krag in exchange for Åstrup in Jutland. He was a major landowner, but lost most of his fortune though speculation.

In 1682, Selsø was acquired by the enterprising noble lady Berte Skeel. She was also the owner of a town mansion on Kongens Nytorv in Copenhagen. She administrated the estate with great skill for the next almost four decades. She also acquired the right of patronage of Skuldelev Church.

=== Scheel-Plessen family ===
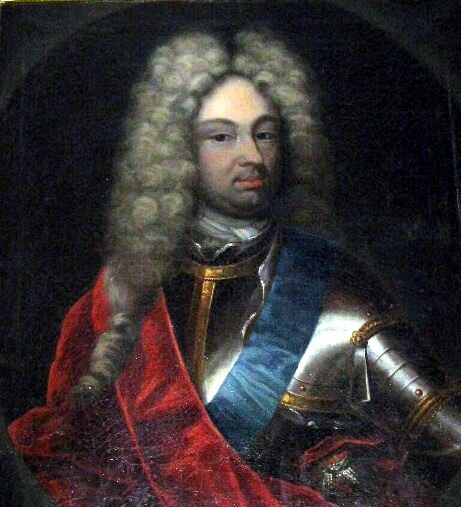
Christian Ludvig von Plessen

In 1729, when Skeel died, Selsø was passed to Christian Ludvig von Plessen (1702–1752), who was married to her niece. From 1728 to 1734, the Renaissance manor was adapted to the Baroque style and has not been substantially altered since. In 1728, Plessen also purchased the nearby manor of Lindholm. By testament, Plessen created a Fideikommis from the two estates with the effect that it could neither be sold or divided between heirs. After Christian Ludvig Scheel von Plessen's death in 1752, Selsø and Lindholm were handed down to his grandson Christian Ludvig Scheel-Plessen.

In 1829, the last occupant of the property, Agathe von Qualen, Christian Ludvig Scheel von Plessen's widow, died. As her heirs were not interested in the estate, the manor's furniture was auctioned off and the house was left unattended for 144 years.

The building soon fell into a sorry state as uninvited visitors plundered its remaining assets. Even the magnificent reception hall was used as storage space for corn. Salvation came in 1972 when the writers Grethe and Bernhard Linder initiated the manor's restoration. The restoration work was successfully conducted over the following 25 years, earning them wide recognition including the Europa Nostra award.

Known as the Selsø-Lindholm estate (Selsø-Lindholm Gods), the property now belongs to the Plessenske Selsø Foundation (Den Plessenske Selsø Fond).

== Architecture ==
The main building is a simple two-storey building constructed in red brick. The roof is clad with red tiles. The gatehouse is from 1734.

== Today ==
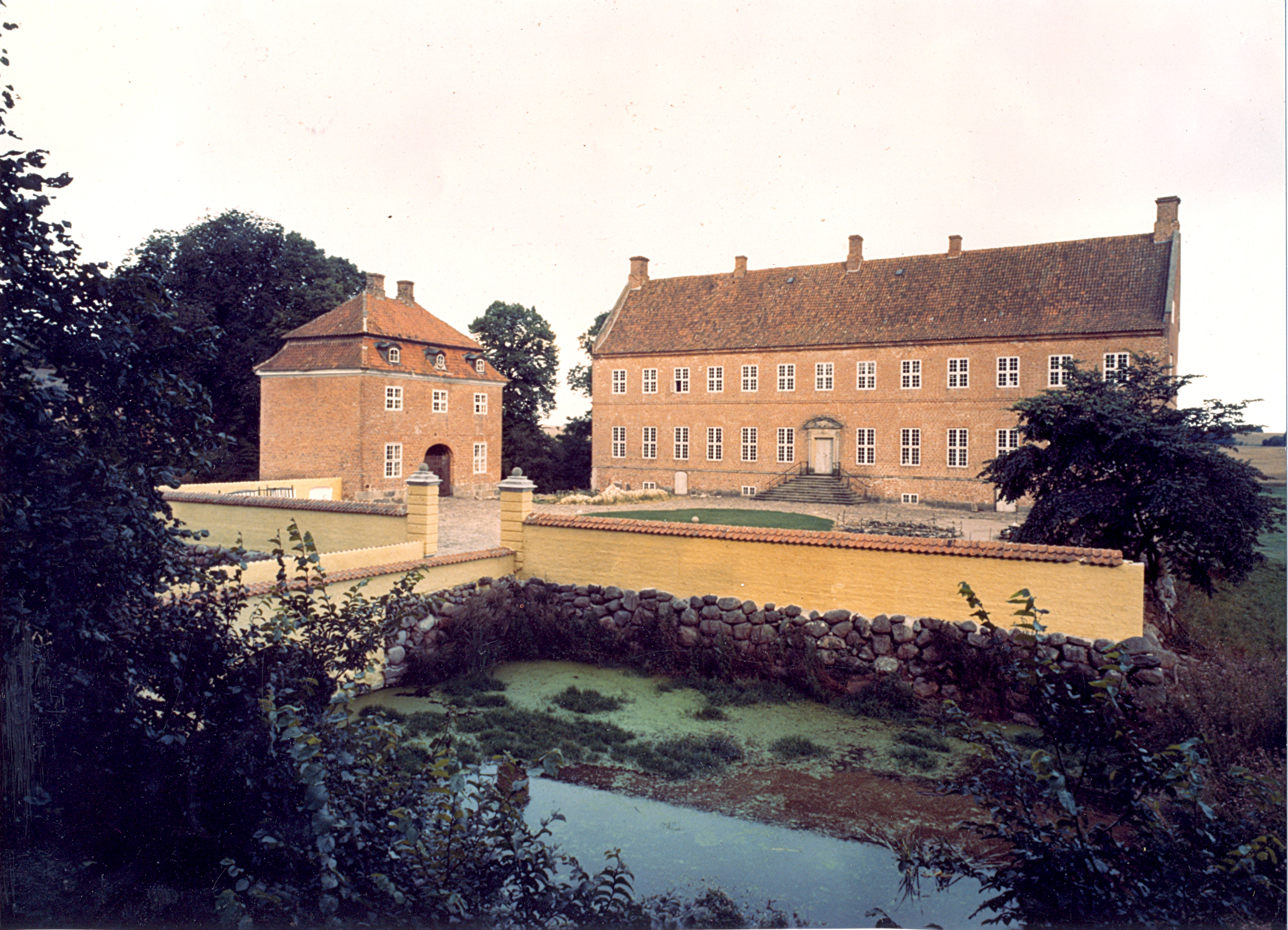
Selsø Castle.

The manor is operated as a museum by the Pklessenske Selsø Fond. It is open to visitors from 11 a.m. to 4 p.m. every day except Monday from May to mid-September. Selsø also arranges a series of events and festivities throughout the year. Concerts are also held in the main hall.

The Selsø-Lindholm estate is owned by M. E. U. von Malsen-Ponikau and J.-H. Malsen-Plessen. It has a total area of 974 hectares, of which Selsø accounts for 296. hectares.

== List of owners ==
- ( -1536) Bishopric of Roskilde
- (1536-1556) The Crown
- (1556-1559) Andreas von Barby
- (1559) Hans von Barby
- (1559-1563) Corfitz Ulfeldt
- (1563-1593) Jacob Ulfeldt
- (1593-1616) Mogens Ulfeldt
- (1616-1624) Corfitz Ulfeldt / Jacob Ulfeldt / Christian Ulfeldt / Anne Ulfeldt
- (1624-1643) Ernst Normand
- (1643-1658) Ingeborg Arenfeldt, gift Normand
- (1663-1669) Joachim Frederik Pentz
- (1669-1679) Erik Krag
- (1679-1682) Vibeke Rosenkrantz, gift Krag
- (1682-1720) Berte Skeel
- (1720-1752) Christian Ludvig von Plessen
- (1752-1801) Christian Ludvig Scheel von Plessen
- (1801-1819) Mogens Scheel von Plessen
- (1819-1856) Magnus Joachim Scheel-Plessen
- (1856-1892) Carl Theodor August Scheel-Plessen
- (1892-1932) Carl Gabriel Joachim Vilhelm Scheel-Plessen
- (1932-1948) Magnus Carl August Wilhelm Otto Scheel-Plessen
- (1948-1964) Victor Friedrich Carl Scheel-Plessen
- (1964-1995) Marina Scheel-Plessen, gift von Malsen Ponickau
- (1995- ) Den Plessenske Selsø Fond

== See also ==
- Jægerspris Castle
