= Berte Skeel =

Danish noble, philanthropist and estate owner (1644–1720)

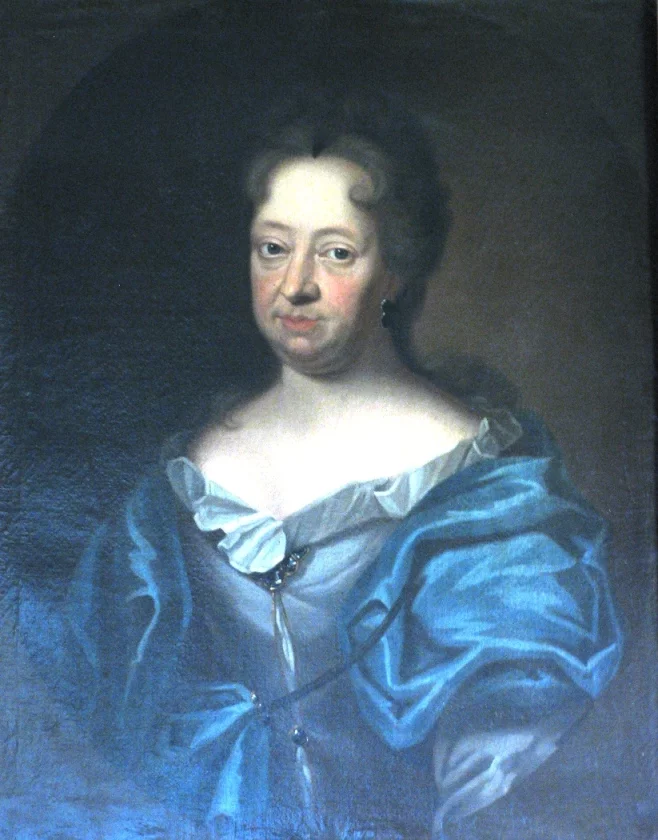
- Born: 26 March 1644; Vallø, Denmark
- Died: 5 July 1720 (aged 76); Copenhagen, Denmark

Berte Skeel (26 March 1644 – 5 July 1720) was a Danish noble, philanthropist and estate owner. She was the owner of Selsø Manor and co-founder of the Roskilde Adelige Jomfrukloster at Roskilde Kloster.

== Early life and marriage ==
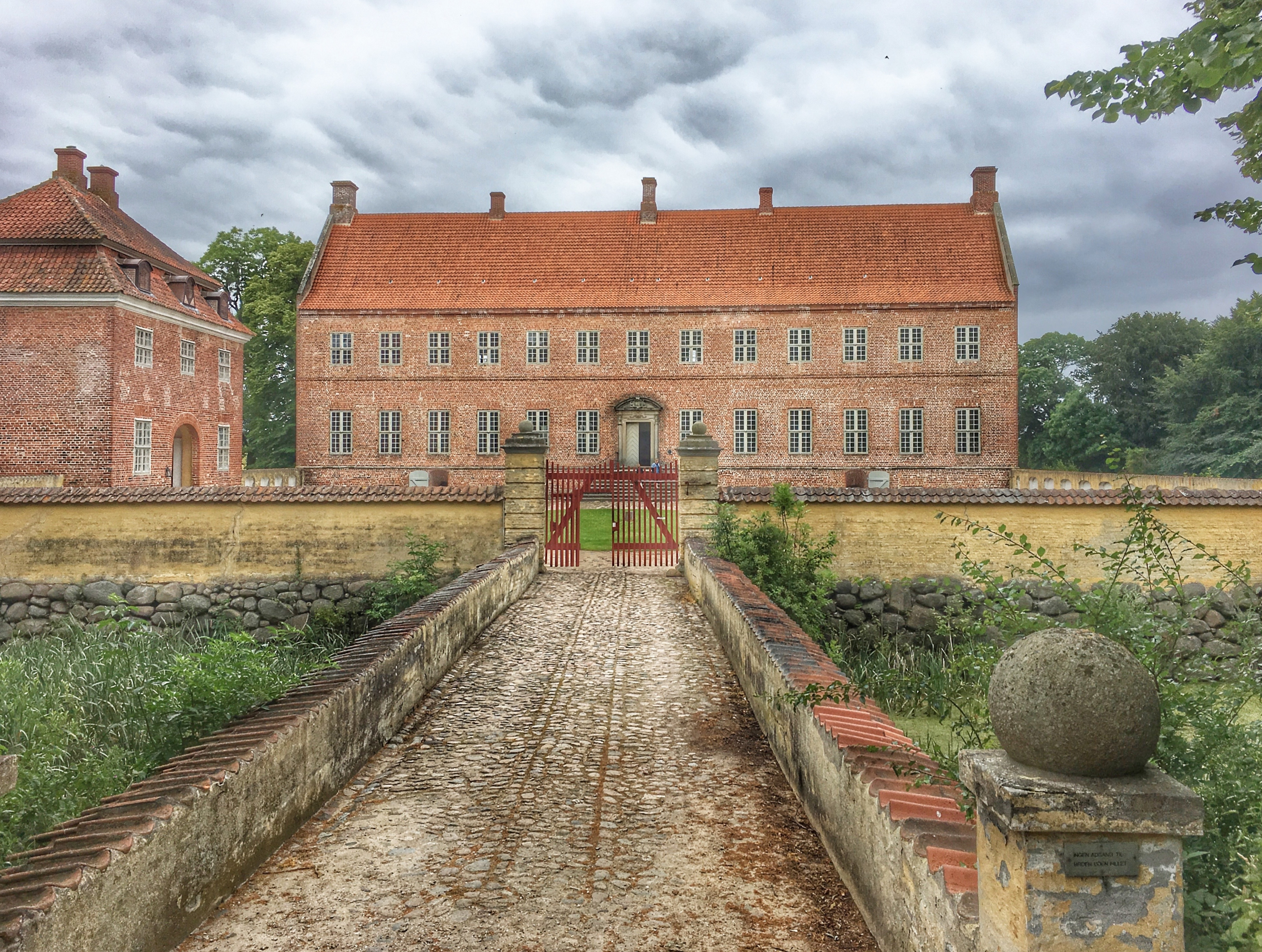
Selsø Manor

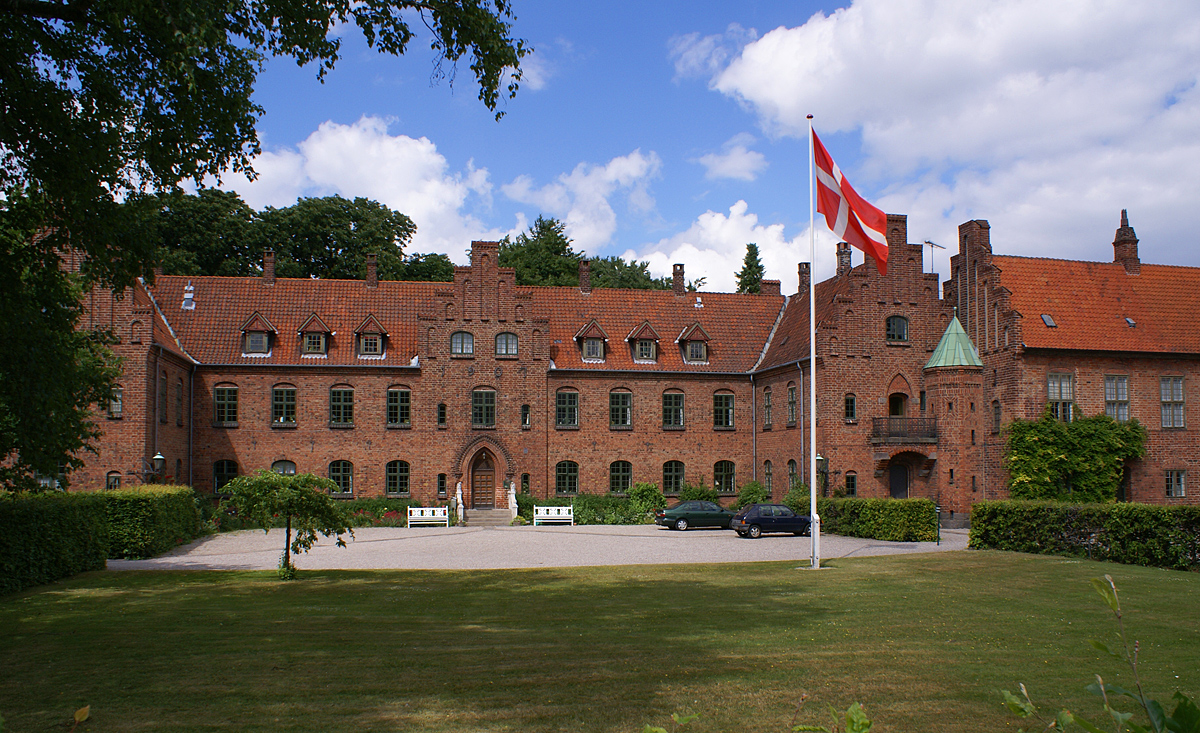
Roskilde Kloster

Berte Skeel was born at Vallø in Stevns on the island of Zealand, Denmark. She was the daughter of riksråd Christen Skeel (d. 1659) and Birgitte Rud (d. 1653). In 1662, she married the noble Niels Rosenkrantz (1627–1676) and had four children who all died in childhood. Niels Rosenkrantz was a career military officer who in 1672 rose to the rank of Major General and commander of Kronborg at Helsingborg. He was killed in action during the Swedish seizure of Helsingborg during the Scanian War.

== Property ==
Berte Skeel often resided at the Selsø Manor in Roskilde, which she acquired in 1683. She had also inherited Holbækgård in Rougsø Herred, Norddjurs Municipality from her father. She was for a short time also the owner of Brorupgaard at Slagelse but sold the property in 1714.

== Philanthropy ==
As a childless widow, she became known for her charity. She accepted children from the nobility of both genders, she managed soup kitchens for the poor, paid the fees of her tenants when they were unable to, and started several charitable foundations. In 1699, she founded the Roskilde Adelige Jomfrukloster (formerly St. Catherine's Priory) at Roskilde Kloster, which has been referred to as the first Protestant abbey for noblewomen in Denmark. Her companion in this enterprise was Margrethe Ulfeldt (1641–1703), daughter of nobleman Knud Ulfeldt (1609–1657) and widow of naval hero Niels Juel (1629–1697).
