= Jacob Ulfeldt (born 1567) =

Danish diplomat (1567–1630)

Jakob Ulfeldt
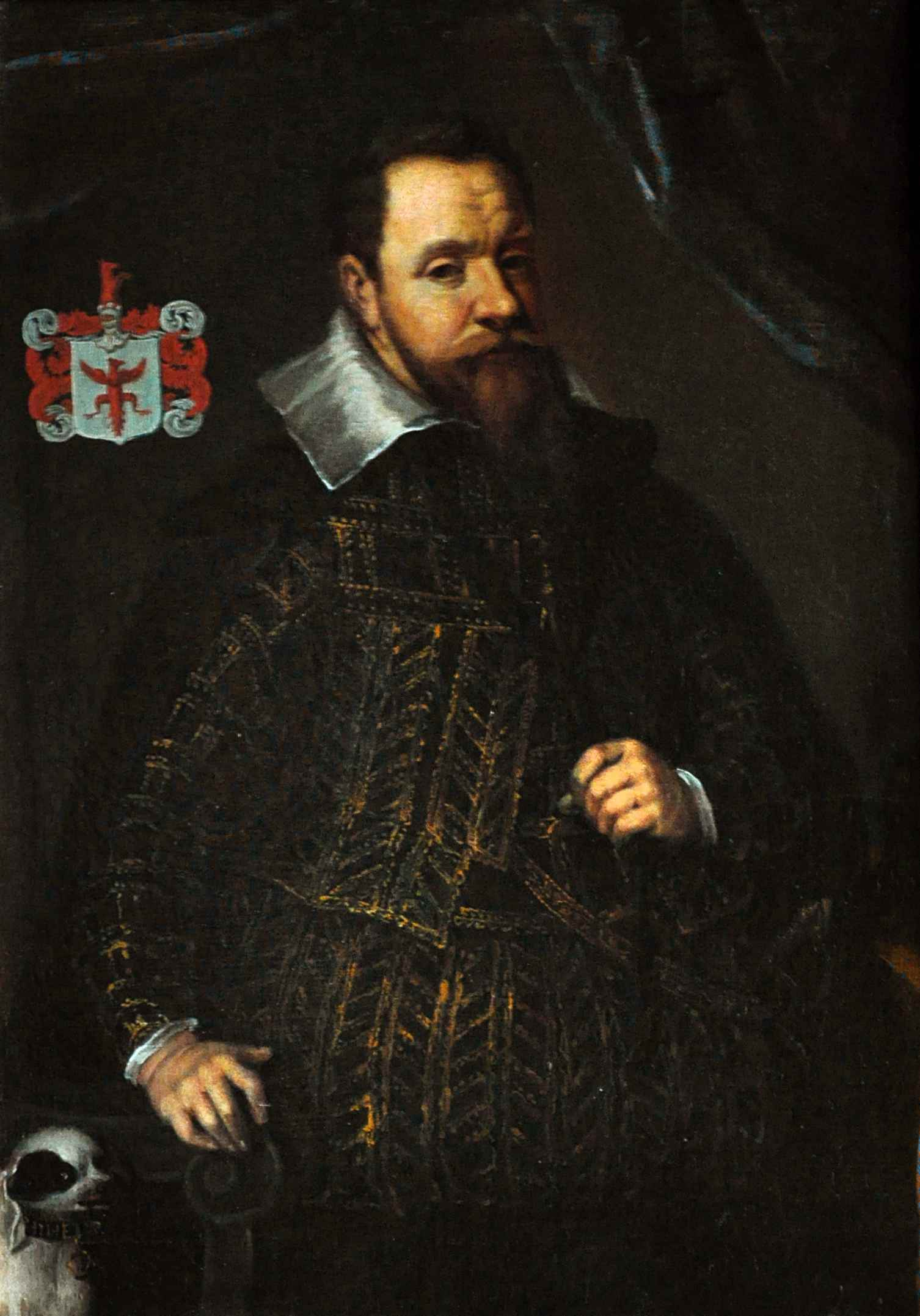
- Ulfeldt dressed in the Spanish fashion in 1610
- Born: June 25, 1567; Næstved Municipality, Denmark
- Died: June 25, 1630 (aged 63); Nyborg, Denmark
- Relatives: Mogens Ulfeldt (brother); Corfitz Ulfeldt (son)

Jacob Ulfeldt (25 June 1567 – 25 June 1630) was a Danish diplomat and chancellor of King Christian IV of Denmark. He and Jonas Charisius were Christian IV's closest advisors.

As part of the Ulfeldt family, he was born into Danish nobility. Ulfeldt traveled widely in his youth, scarcely returning to Denmark between 1581 and 1597. He authored accounts of his travels in the Ottoman Empire and Middle East. After returning to Denmark in the 1590s, he became a close confidant of the king's and was eventually appointed Chancellor of the Realm in 1609. Ulfeldt was a dominant force in the monarchy's foreign policy during the 1610s and 1620s.

== Early life and travels ==
Jacob Ulfeldt was born at Bavelse on 25 June 1567. He one of four sons of privy councillor Jacob Ulfeldt (1535–1593) and Anne Jakobsdatter Flemming. After his mother's death in 1570, he was raised by his grandmother until the age of 7, when he was then tutored at home.

At the age of 14, he left Denmark to study abroad, as was typical of Danish nobility during this era. Ulfeldt, however, stayed abroad for longer than most. During his time abroad, he studied in the Holy Roman Empire. He participated in a military campagain in Sicily and Malta against Ottoman forces. He then travelled through the Ottoman Empire from Greece to Egypt, and visited Spain, France, and the Netherlands on his way back to Denmark.

After returning to Denmark in 1591, he promptly left the next year to study at the University of Geneva. Before he could complete his studies, his father's deteriorating health called him back home. His father died in 1593. Some time after his father's death, he again left Denmark to travel and did not return until 1597.

Ulfeldt has left a vivid account of his travels in the Holy Land and Egypt, which is still kept at the Danish Royal Library, describing Constantinople, the Colossus of Rhodes, Islands in the Adriatic Sea, Cyprus, Tripoli, Beirut, Sidon, Tyre (Lebanon), Jaffa, Jerusalem, and Cairo together with the Giza pyramids and Pyramid of Djoser (Kobenhavn, Det Kongelige Bibliothek, Håndskriftsamlingen, Thott 1294 4°, Reise til Palæstina 1588).

== Career ==
After returning to Denmark in 1597, he managed his estates, included Ulfeldtsholm which he had inherited from his father in 1593. Ulfeldt soon developed an amiable relationship with King Christian IV, whom he accompanied to Hamburg in 1603, England in 1606, and Stavanger in 1607. In 1607, Ulfeldt became a member of the Privy Council. In 1609, he was appointed Chancellor of the Realm.

Ulfedt occupied a leading position in the foreign diplomacy of Christian IV, particularly in matters related to Spain, the Netherlands, and the Holy Roman Empire. During his career, he participated in some sort of diplomatic mission abroad nearly every year. His most notable diplomatic missions were to the Netherlands in 1621 and Lübeck in 1629. He was a driving force behind the alliance with the Netherlands in 1621 and the extended union with the duchies of Schleswig-Holstein in 1623. Unlike the Privy Council, from 1621 he worked for the creation of a Protestant union under the leadership of Christian IV in the Thirty Years' War, an effort which was successful in 1625.

== Personal life ==
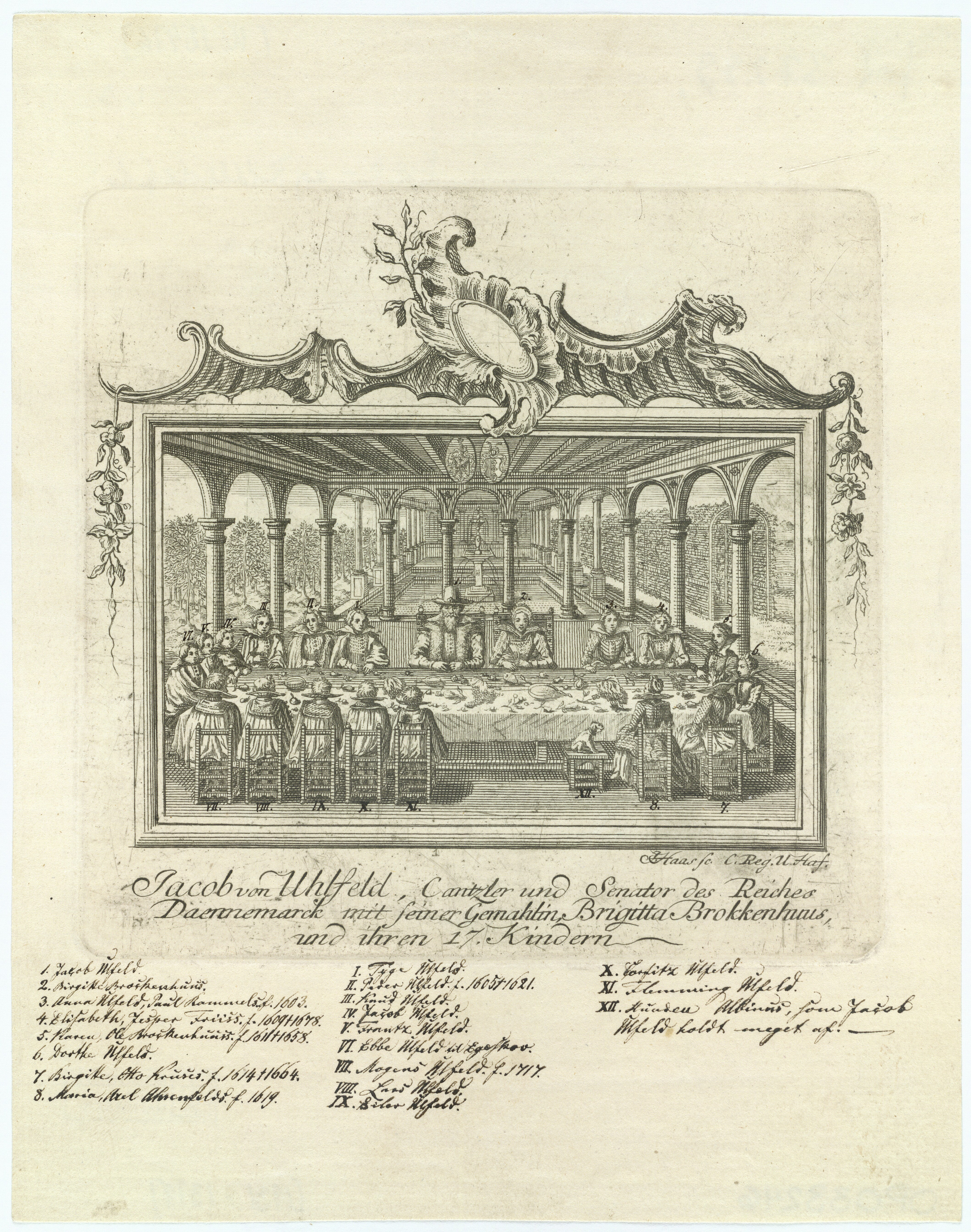
Jacob Ulfeldt and Birgitte Brockenhuus together with their 16 children

Ulfeldt married Birgitte Brockenhuus (9 August 1580–24 December 1656) on 10 June 1599 in Nyborg. She was the daughter of lensmand Laurids Brockenhuus (1552–1604), owner of Egeskov and Bramstrup, and Karen née Skram (1544–1625). Together, Jacob and Anne had 16 children:

- Knud (1600–1646)
- Jacob (1601–1625)
- Franz (1601–1636)
- Anne (1603–1642)
- Peder (1604–1621)
- Laurids (1605–1659)
- Corfitz (1606–1664)
- Flemming (1607–1657)
- Elsebet (1609–1676)
- Ebbe (1610–1654)
- Karen (1611–1658)
- Dorte (1612–1616)
- Eiler (1613–1644)
- Birgitte (1614–1664)
- Mogens (1617–1646)
- Marie Margrethe (1619–1694)
- Tyge (1621–1637)

In 1610, he was granted Nyborg Slot, where he then resided for the remainder of his life. In 1616, he sold Ulfeldtsholm to Ellen Marsvin and instead acquired Egeskov Castle.

Ulfeldt died on 25 June 1630 at Nyborg, after suffering from a lengthy illness since 1625. After his death, his widow died in 1656 with very little to her name as a result of their son Corfitz' conviction of treason during the Dano-Swedish War (1657–1658) and his subsequent exile.
