= Tapdrup =

- Village
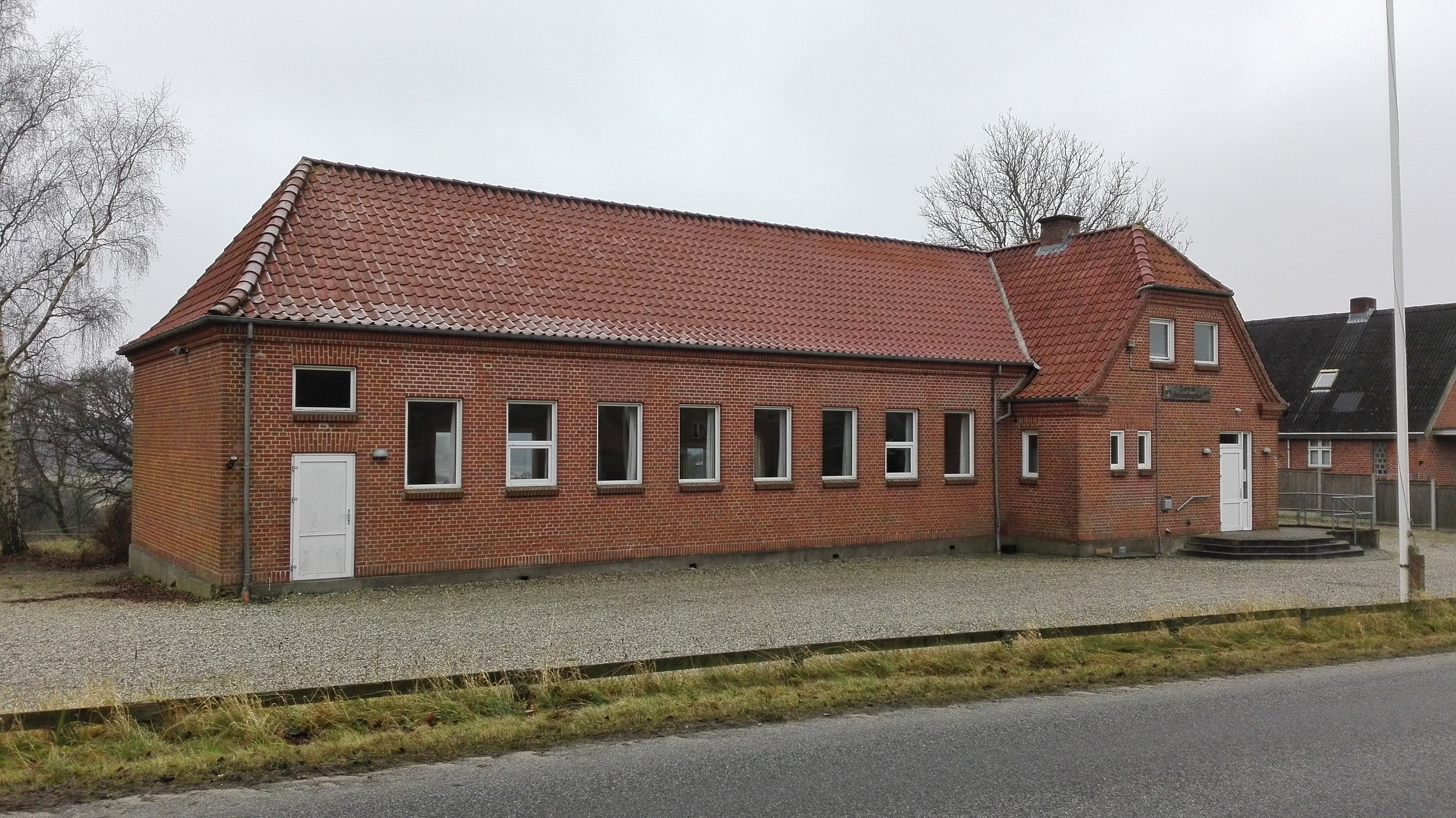
- The village hall in Tapdrup

- Location in Central Denmark Region Tapdrup (Denmark)
- Coordinates: 56°26′28″N 9°29′4″E
- Country: Denmark
- Region: Central Denmark (Midtjylland)
- Municipality: Viborg Municipality

Population (2026)
  - Total: 588

Tapdrup is a village with a population of 588 (1 January 2026), in Viborg Municipality, Central Denmark Region in Denmark. It is located 11 km southwest of Ørum Sønderlyng and 7 km east of Viborg.

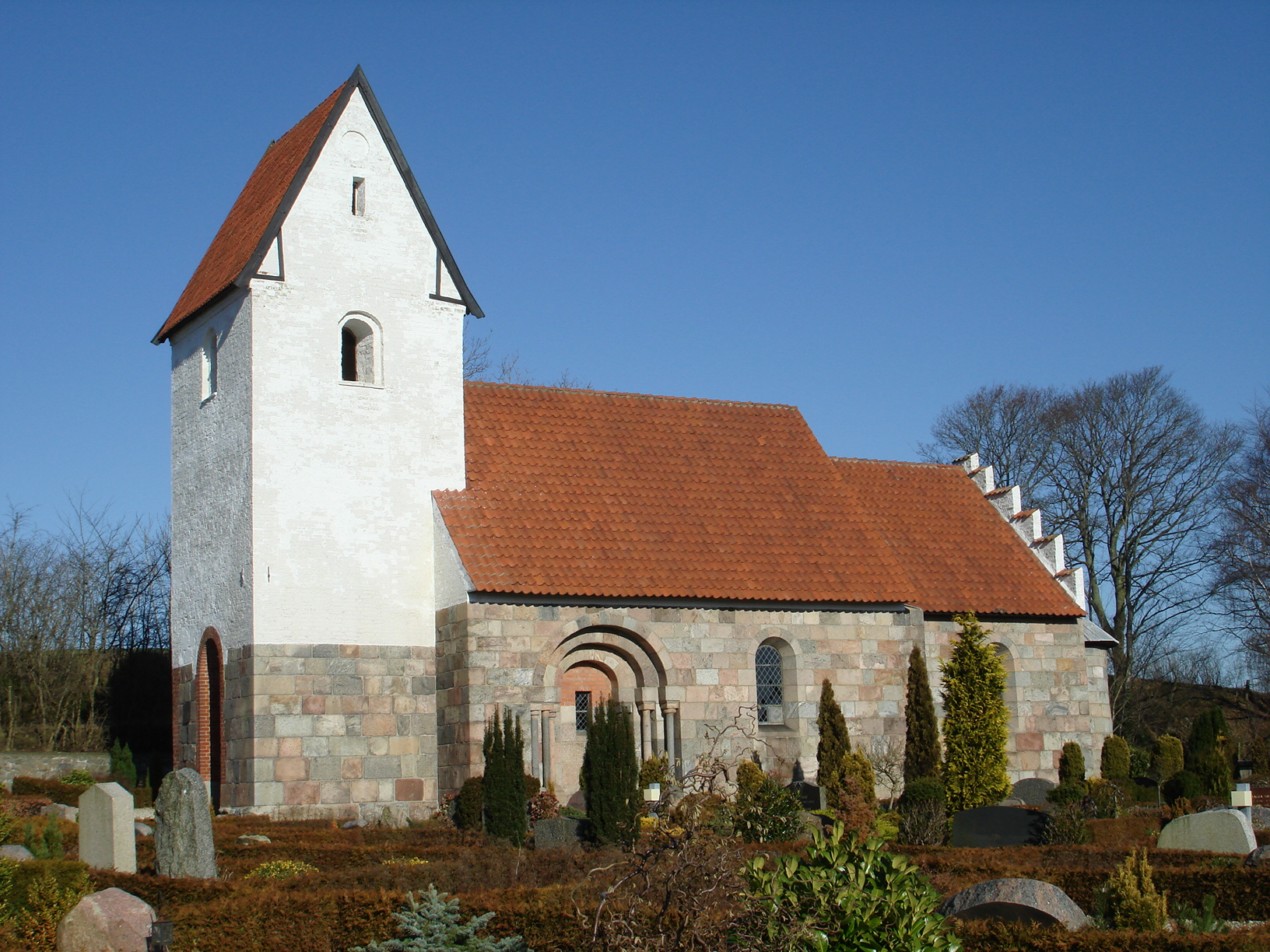
Tapdrup church

Tapdrup Church is located in the village.
