= Corfits Ulfeldt (naval officer) =

Danish naval officer

Corfits Mogensen Ulfeldt (c. 1600 – October 1644) was a Danish naval officer. He was a cousin of the much more famous traitor Corfitz Ulfeldt (1606–1664). He is known in the annals of whaling as the man who drove the French out of Spitsbergen. Ulfeldt later fought and died in the Torstenson War.

== Family ==
Ulfeldt was the son of Council of State member and High Admiral (Rigsadmiral) Mogens Ulfeldt (1569-1616) and Anne Christensdatter Lange (Munk). He was the grandson of Jacob Ulfeldt (1535–1593), who served as a member of the privy council. He had a sister and at least two brothers: Anne Mogensen Ulfeldt (1598-1655), Jacob Mogensen Ulfeldt (c.1600–c.1670) and Christian Mogensen Ulfeldt. He was married to Else Andersdatter Thot (d. 1652), widow of Hans Hansen Lindenov (d. 1620).

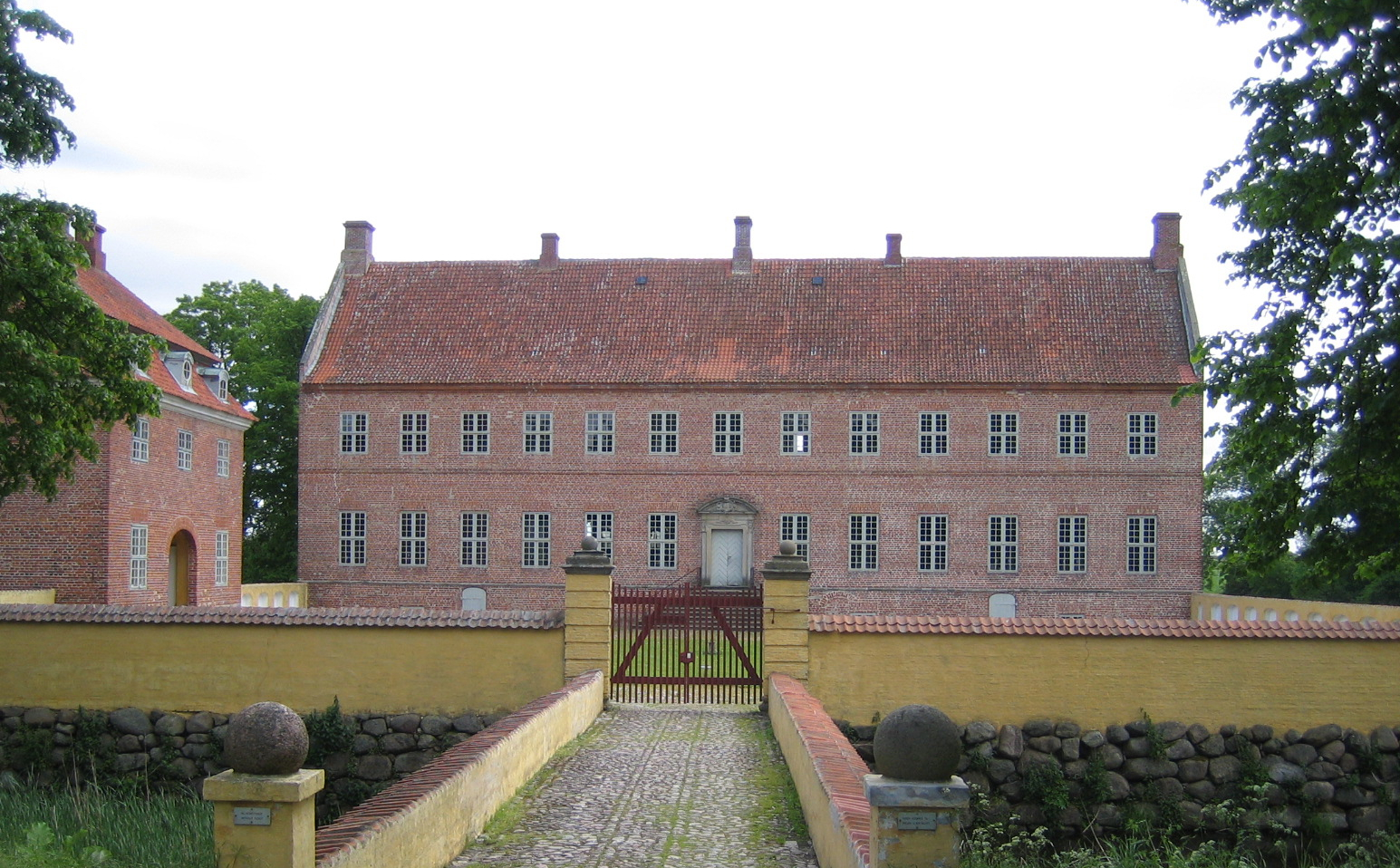
Selsø Manor (Roskilde)

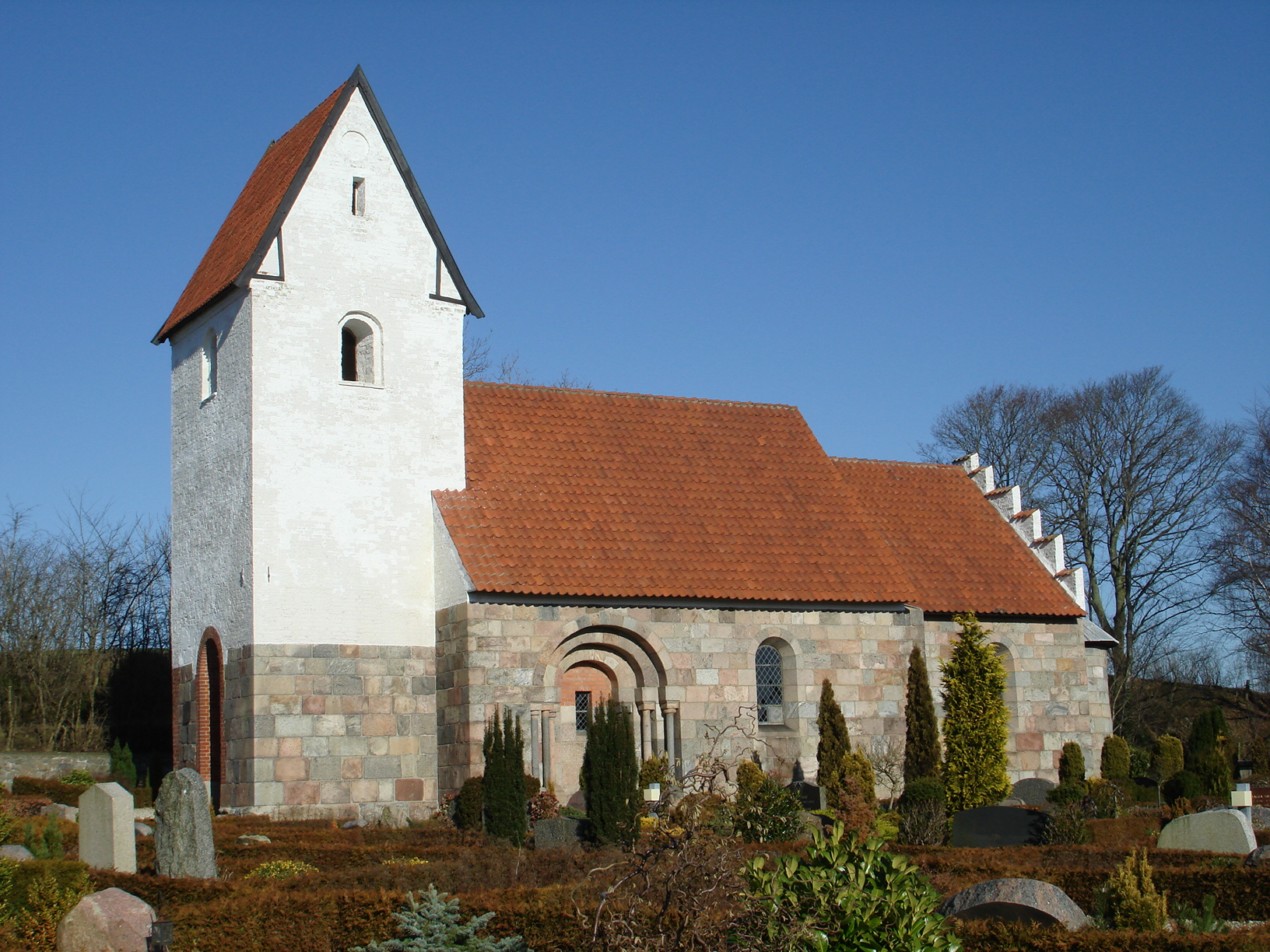
Tapdrup Church (Viborg)

== Career ==
In 1624, King Christian IV, wrote to Ulfeldt and his brothers, encouraging them to travel abroad. In order to cover travel expenses, they had to sell their father's estate Selsø at Roskilde. In 1631, Ulfeldt sold a manor in Bonderup; two years later he pledged his mother's estates at Tvis and Krogsdal. On July 9, in the same year he sold the latter estates, he was commissioned as a ship's captain. In July 1634 he was made Admiral of the Elbe, and was ordered to seize any Hamburg ships he came across between Øresund and Helgoland. In October he was ordered to remain on the Elbe through the winter with Nældebladet and Skiens Galej, while Hummeren, Havhesten and Kronegalej were to return to Copenhagen. In 1635 he spent a month recruiting seamen.

In March 1637 Ulfeldt received orders to convoy the Danish whaling fleet to Spitsbergen in the man-of-war De To Løver as well as to reassert Christian IV's claim of sovereignty over the land. Ulfeldt, with support from the fleet, seized some 600 barrels of whale oil and 60 barrels of baleen from the French ships under Petrissans de Larralde anchored in Hamburgbukta before driving them out of their harbor. In July of the same year he also met a French ship on the open sea at 78° N, the Fleur of Ciboure, under Dominique Daguerre, which had been hunting whales between 73° and 76° N. Ulfeldt brought it to Kobbefjorden, where about 400 barrels of blubber and 100 quintals of baleen were confiscated. The following spring he again received orders to convoy the fleet, this time with three ships: De Tre Løver, Lammet, and Stokfisken. He again seized the French ships' goods (559 casks of oil and over 9,000 lbs of baleen) and drove them out of Port Louis, which the Danes renamed Ulfeldts Bay in his honor. His actions led the French to temporarily abandon Hamburgbukta. Ulfeldt also detained two Dutch ships, the Sanct Pieter, under Claes Melchiorsz, and the Eenhoorn, under Adriaen Ollebrantsz, for over a month in Copenhagen Bay, but they were later released after a brief battle between Ulfeldt and the rest of the Dutch whaling fleet. The Dutch complained bitterly against this treatment. Three years of negotiations followed, resulting in the two countries agreeing to cease hostilities in Spitsbergen. Ulfeldt's cruises were the last in a two-and-a-half decade long struggle between European whalers there.

In May 1640 he was appointed captain of Lindormen, and on 5 August was made Admiral of the former ship and Lammet, which were to sail to England with envoys. At Flækkerø (present-day Flekkerøya, an island off Kristiansand) Lammet struck a rock; later a storm separated the two ships for three days and nights. Ulfeldt was able to ride it out anchored off the English coast. He received a pay raise of 50 dalers later the same month. During 1641, from 17 April to 13 September, Ulfeldt was at sea. At the Battle of Colberger Heide during 1 July 1644 (in which King Christian IV suffered the loss of an eye) Ulfeldt served aboard De Tre Kroner under Admiral Pros Mund as Vice-admiral of the squadron. He again served under Admiral Pros Mund in the Battle of Fehmarn off Lolland (13 October 1644) as Rear-admiral aboard Stormarn. During the battle his ship ran aground. Ulfeldt was killed while defending it against capture by the Swedish forces. He was buried at Tapdrup Church (Tapdrup kirke) in the village of Tapdrup near Viborg.
