= Holckenhavn Castle =

Manor house in Funen, Denmark

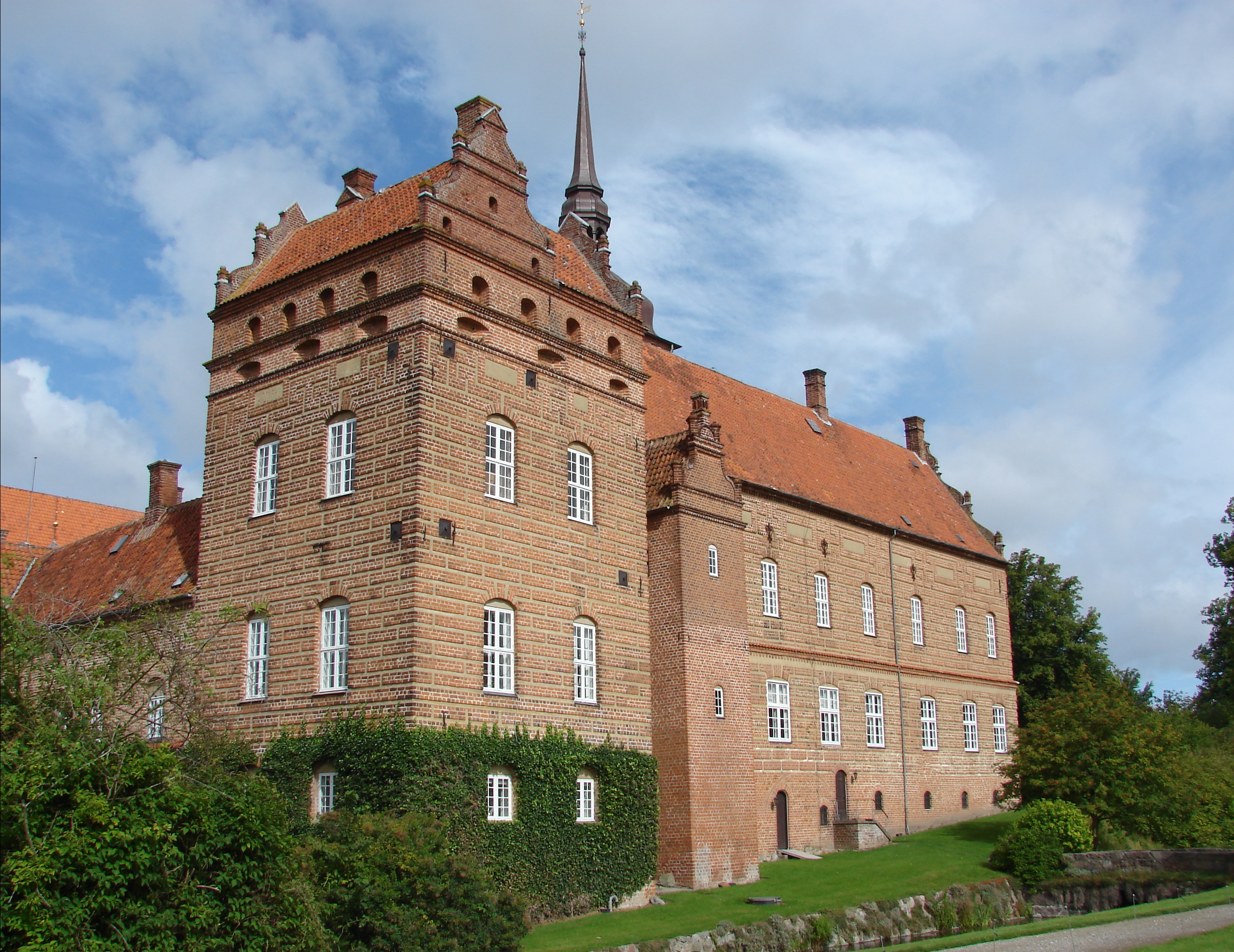
- Interactive map of the Holckenhavn Castle area

General information
- Architectural style: Renaissance
- Location: Nyborg Municipality, Denmark
- Coordinates: 55°17′34.26″N 10°46′30.58″E
- Construction started: 1580
- Completed: 1634
- Client: Erik Hardenberg

Holckenhavn Castle is a manor house located next to Holckenhavn Fjord, an arm of the Great Belt, just south of Nyborg on the east coast of Funen, Denmark. The current Renaissance castle was built in the late 16th and early 17th century by three consecutive owners. Previously known both as Ulfeldtsholm and Ellensborg, it received its current name in 1672 when it was acquired by Eiler Holck, who at the same time founded the Barony of Holckenhavn. The estate has been in the possession of his family ever since.

== History ==
=== Early history ===
Originally known as Kogsbølle, the estate traces its history back to the late 14th century when it was owned by Anders Jacobsen Ulfeldt. The house remained in the possession of the Ulfeldt family for more than 200 years. The original house was located further inland but shortly after 1580 it was moved to its current position next to a small arm of the Great Belt and its name was changed to Ulfeldtsholm.

=== Ellensborg, 1616–1672 ===
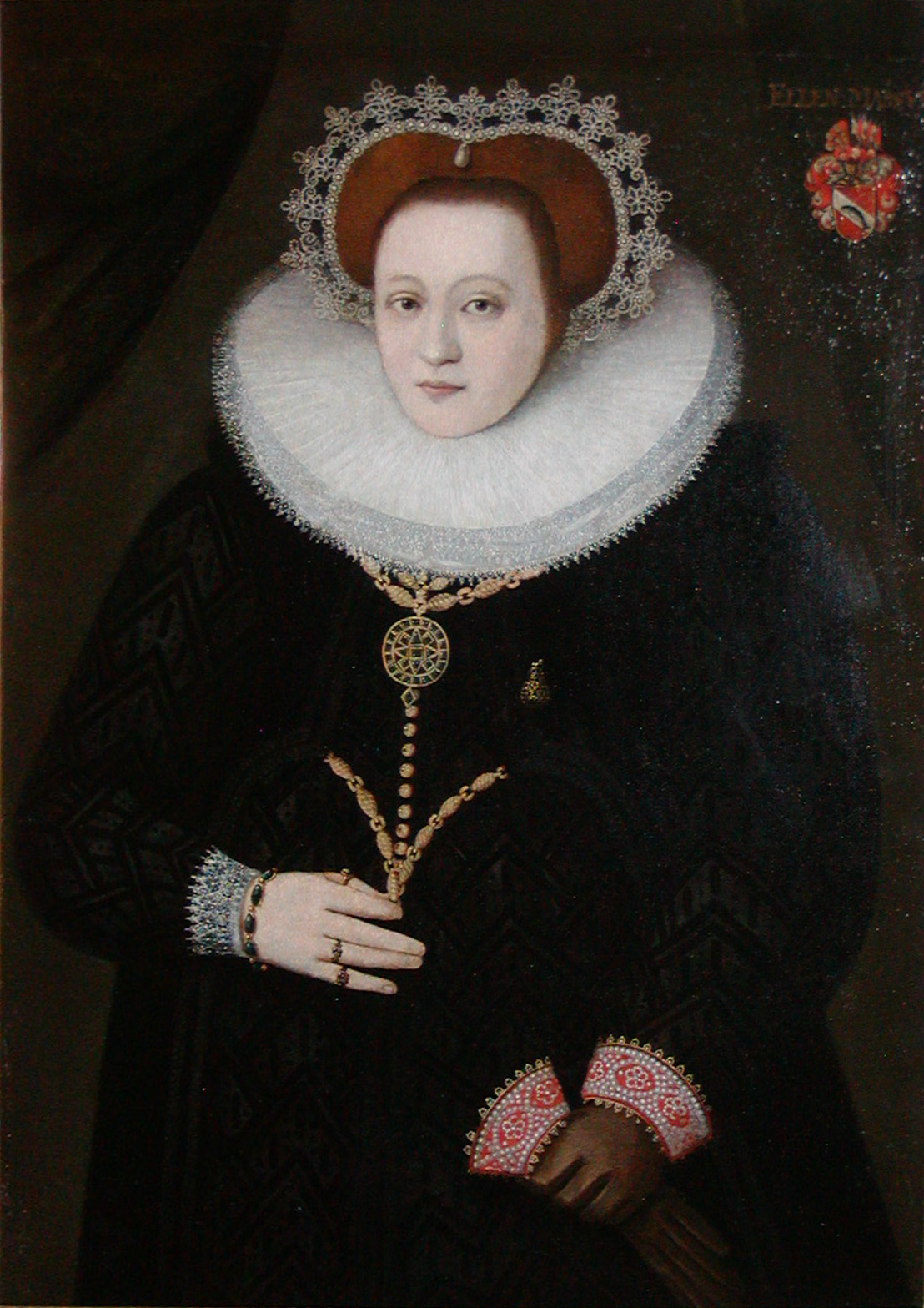
Ellen Marsvin

In 1616, Chancellor of the Realm Jakob Ulfeldt sold the family estate to Ellen Marsvin after Ulfeldt acquired Egeskov Castle. Marsvin had been widowed for the second time a few years earlier at the age of 39, turned to farming and became one of the largest land owners of her time. She expanded the castle with two more wings and carried out extravagant interior alterations.

Ellen Marsvin was the mother of Kirsten Munk who was married to King Christian IV until she fell into disfavour due to her infidelity and left the king. When Kirsten Munk died in 1658 the castle was passed on to their daughter Leonora Christina, whose husband, former Steward of the Realm Corfitz Ulfeldt had joined forces with Sweden in its invasion of Denmark. For this act of treason the couple was imprisoned at Hammershus fortress on the island of Bornholm. After their release in 1661, they took up residence at Ellensborg until they left the country in 1662 and the estate was confiscated.

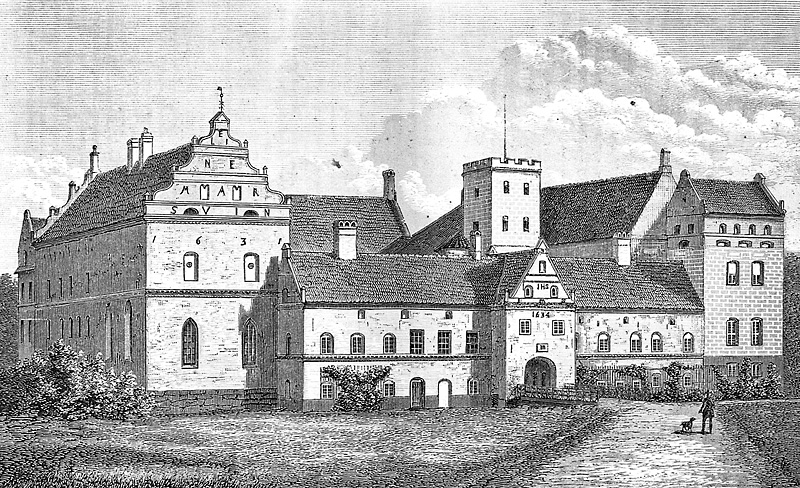
Holckenhavn in the 1870s

=== Holck era ===
After its confiscation, Ellensborg was left empty for almost a decade but in 1672 it was granted to Eiler Holck, the commandant at Kronborg. He renamed it Holckenhavn and founded the Barony of Holckenhavn (dissolved in 1921).

Holckenhavn is still in the possession of the Holck family.

== Architecture ==
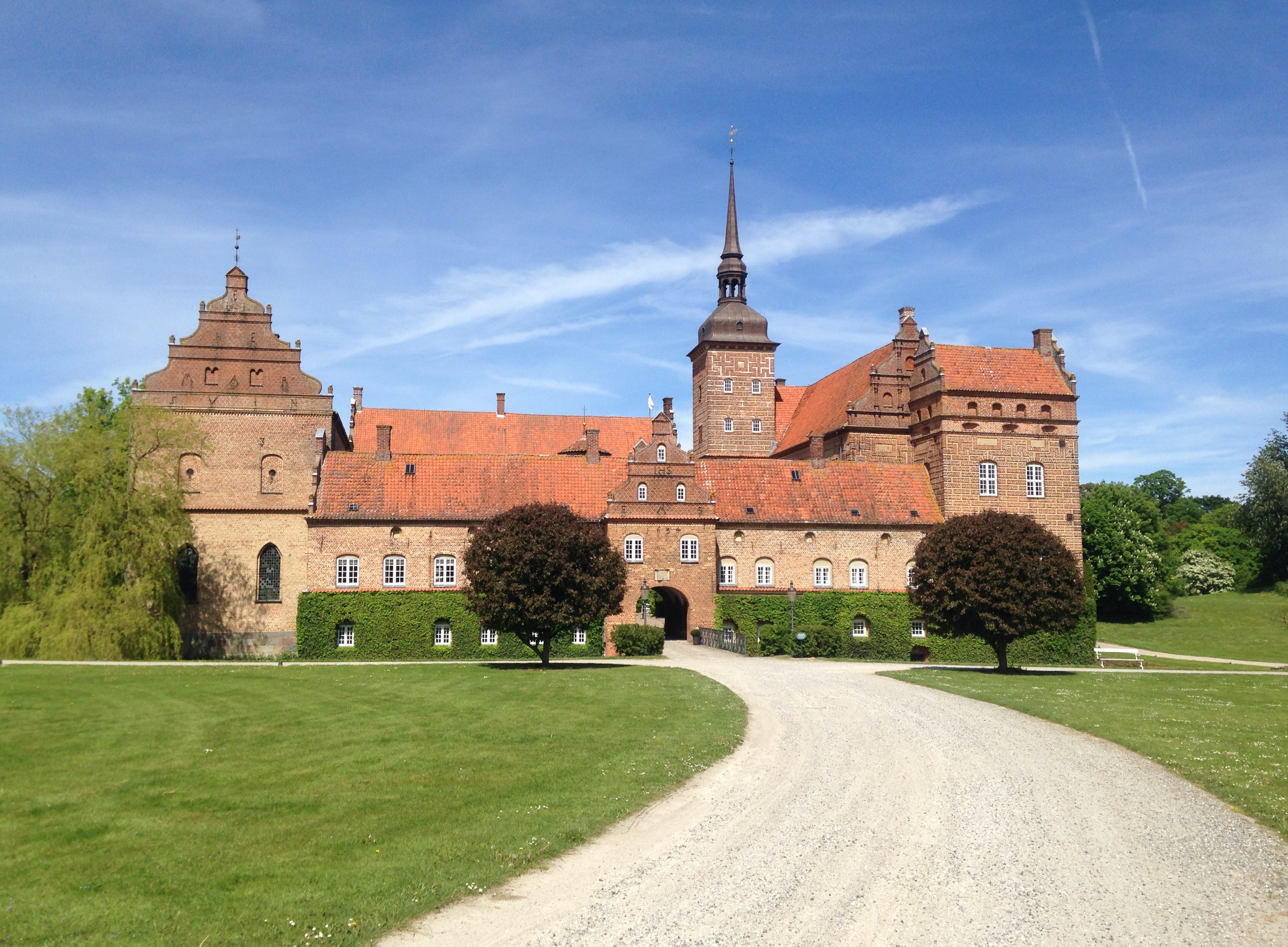
Holckenhavn Castle

Situated on an almost quadratic castle bank, Holckenhavn is a four-winged complex designed in the Renaissance style and built over the course of three generations. The north and east wings, as well as the gate wing, were completed by 1585. The large bell tower was added somewhat later. The master builder was probably Domenicus Badiaz.

Ellen Marsvin added the west wing in 1631 and a low south-facing gate wing in 1634. She is also responsible for a chapel installed in 1637 richly decorated with wood carvings by Hans Dreier, and a richly decorated knights' hall.

The main building was altered in the 18th and 19th century and thoroughly refurbished from 1904 to 1910.

The site also includes a barn from 1629 which is the only surviving component of a farm which burned down in 1912.

== Holckenhavn Castle today ==
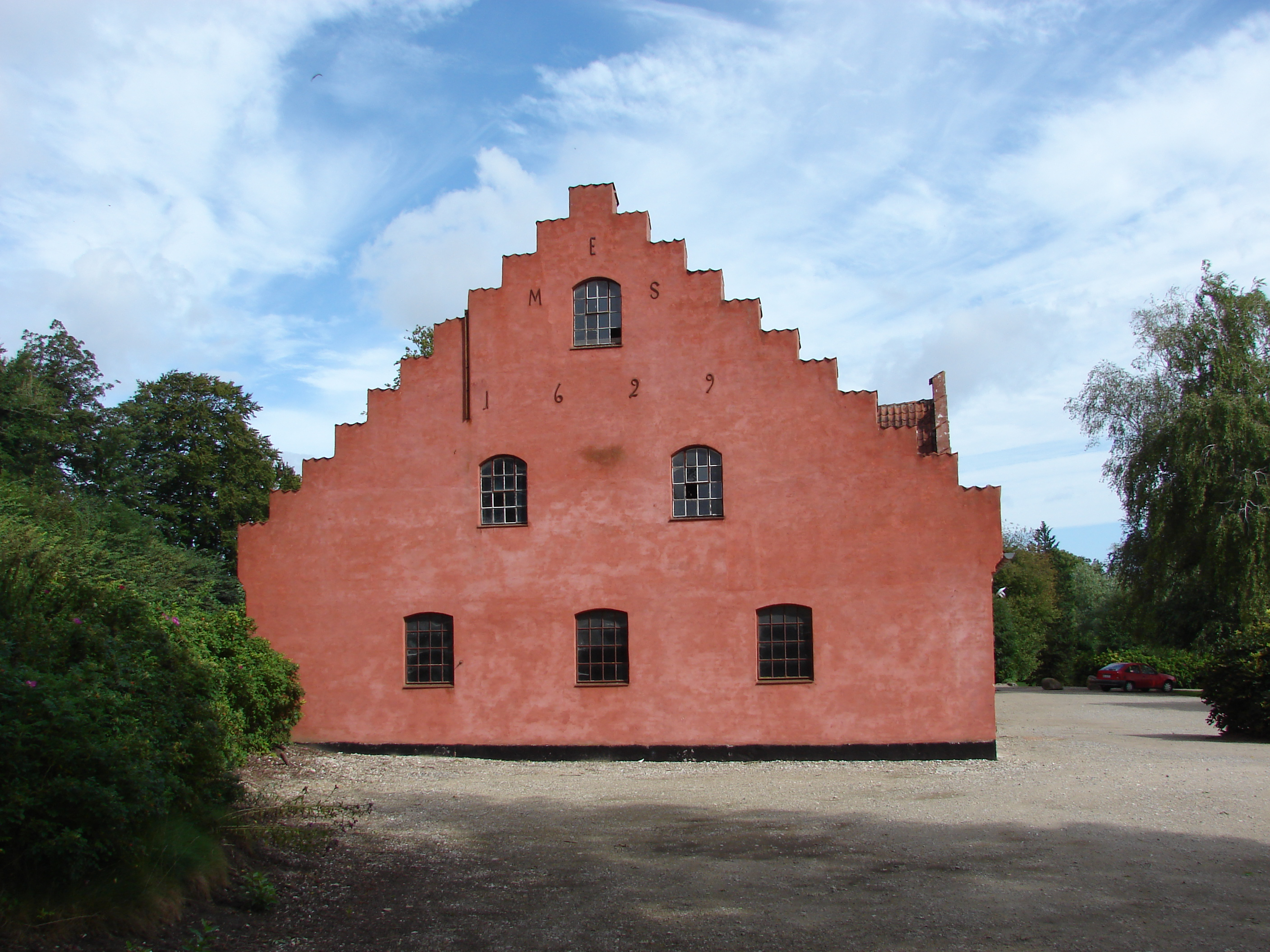
House near the castle

The main building is rented out as a venue for conferences, private celebrations and other events. The estate covers approximately 900 hectares of which about 380 hectares are forest and about 400 hectares are agricultural land which is leased out. A number of smaller houses and other buildings also belong to the estate and are rented out. The 12-hectare park is open to the public.

== Owners ==
- (1380–1410) Anders Jacobsen Ulfeldt
- (1410–1420) Mette Rixdorf née Ulfeldt
- (1420–1445) Erik Andersen Ulfeldt
- (1445–1490) Anders Eriksen Ulfeldt
- (1490–1495) Mette Sverin née Ulfeldt
- (1495–1515) Ebbe Andersen Ulfeldt
- (1515–1540) Knud Ebbesen Ulfeldt
- (1540–1566) Corfitz Knudsen Ulfeldt
- (1566–1593) Jacob Corfitzen Ulfeldt
- (1593–1616) Jacob Jacobsen Ulfeldt
- (1616–1649) Ellen Marsvin (married name Munk)
- (1649–1658) Kirsten Ludvigsdater Munk
- (1658) Leonora Christine née Ulfeldt
- (1658–1662) Corfitz Ulfeldt
- (1662–1672) The Crown
- (1672–1696) Eiler Holck
- (1696–1708) Frederik Christian Holck
- (1708–1740) Eiler Holck
- (1740–1760) Christian Frederik Holck
- (1760–1777) Erik Holck
- (1777–1781) Iver Holck
- (1781–1801) Mogens Frederik Anton Iver Holck
- (1801–1830) Frederik Conrad Holck
- (1830–1877) Conrad Frederik Erik Holck
- (1877–1919) Christian Eiler Holck
- (1919–1961) Mogens Conrad Christian Holck
- (1961–1972) Mogens Preben Christian-Eiler Howden-Rønnenkamp Holck
- (1972–1990) Mogens Eiler Christian Iver Howden-Rønnenkamp Holck
- (1990–2007) Christina Howden-Rønnenkamp Holck née Hou Andersen
- (2007–present) Christina Hou Holck / Dennis Hou Holck

== See also ==
- Slipshavn
