= Jacob Mogensen Ulfeldt =

Danish painter (c. 1600 – c. 1670)

Jacob Mogensen, or Ebbe Ulfeldt (c. 1600 – c. 1670), was the brother of the Danish naval officer Corfits Ulfeldt, and became a landscape painter in Delft.

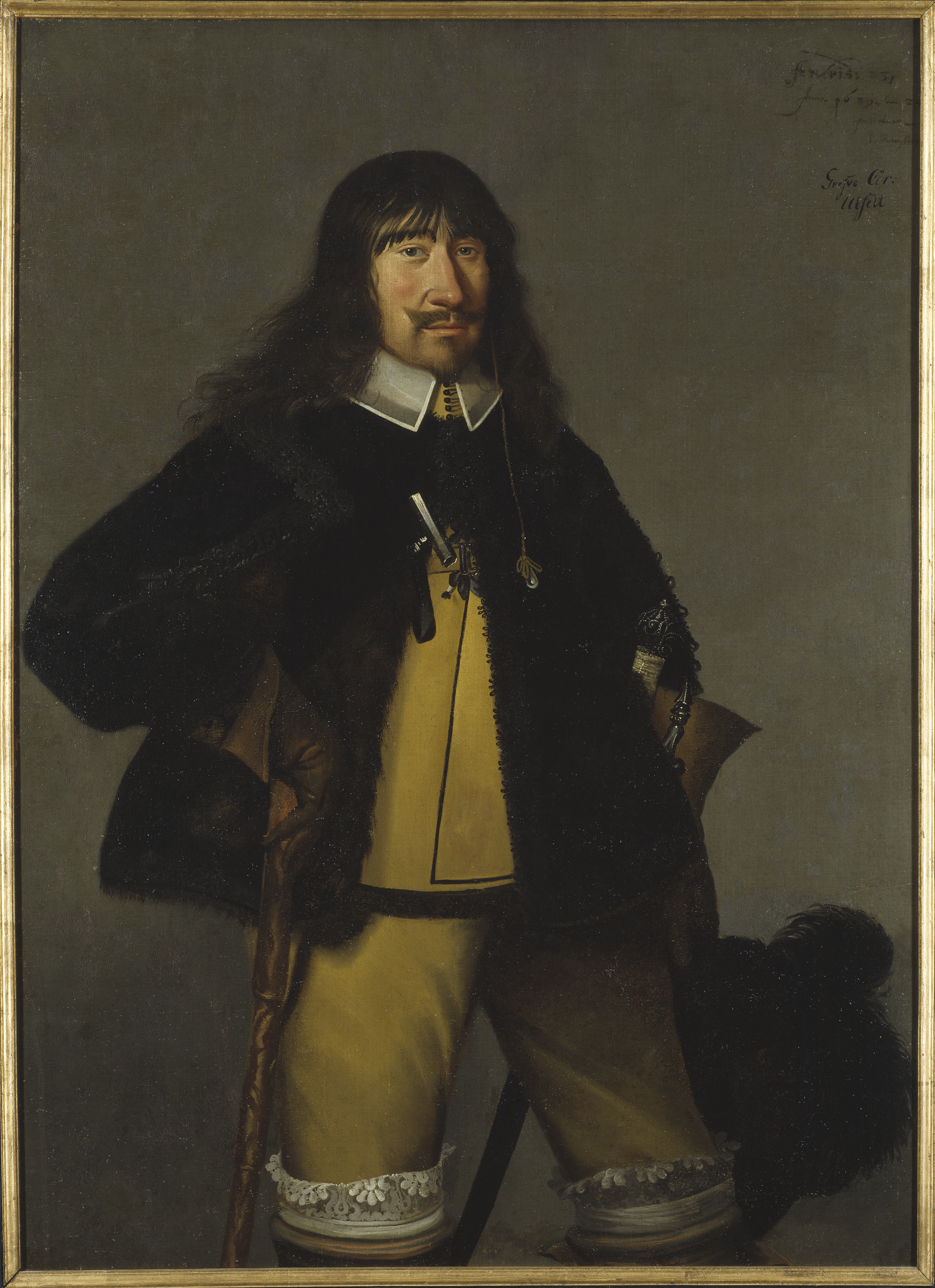
Ebbe Ulfeldt

According to the RKD he was a registered pupil of Jacob Vosmaer. He is probably the "Delvenaar" referred to as "Ugaart", in Arnold Houbraken's Schouburg. According to Houbraken, Ugaart Delvenaar was a good landscape painter who lived in the same period as Jan Verkolje. In his biographical sketch of Verkolje, Houbraken mentions another Dane, Henrik Steenwinkel, who was a Verkolje pupil. He wrote a biographical sketch for a Steenwinkel who worked for Christian IV of Denmark-Norway in 1640. This court painter Steenwinkel that Houbraken refers to was probably Morten Steenwinkel, the later teacher of Bernhard Keil. Possibly Morten and Henrik were the same person or brothers travelling together, but all these men would have known and consorted with each other as Danish compatriots in the small painter circles of Delft and Amsterdam.
