= Jacob Ulfeldt (1535–1593) =

Danish diplomat (1535–1593)

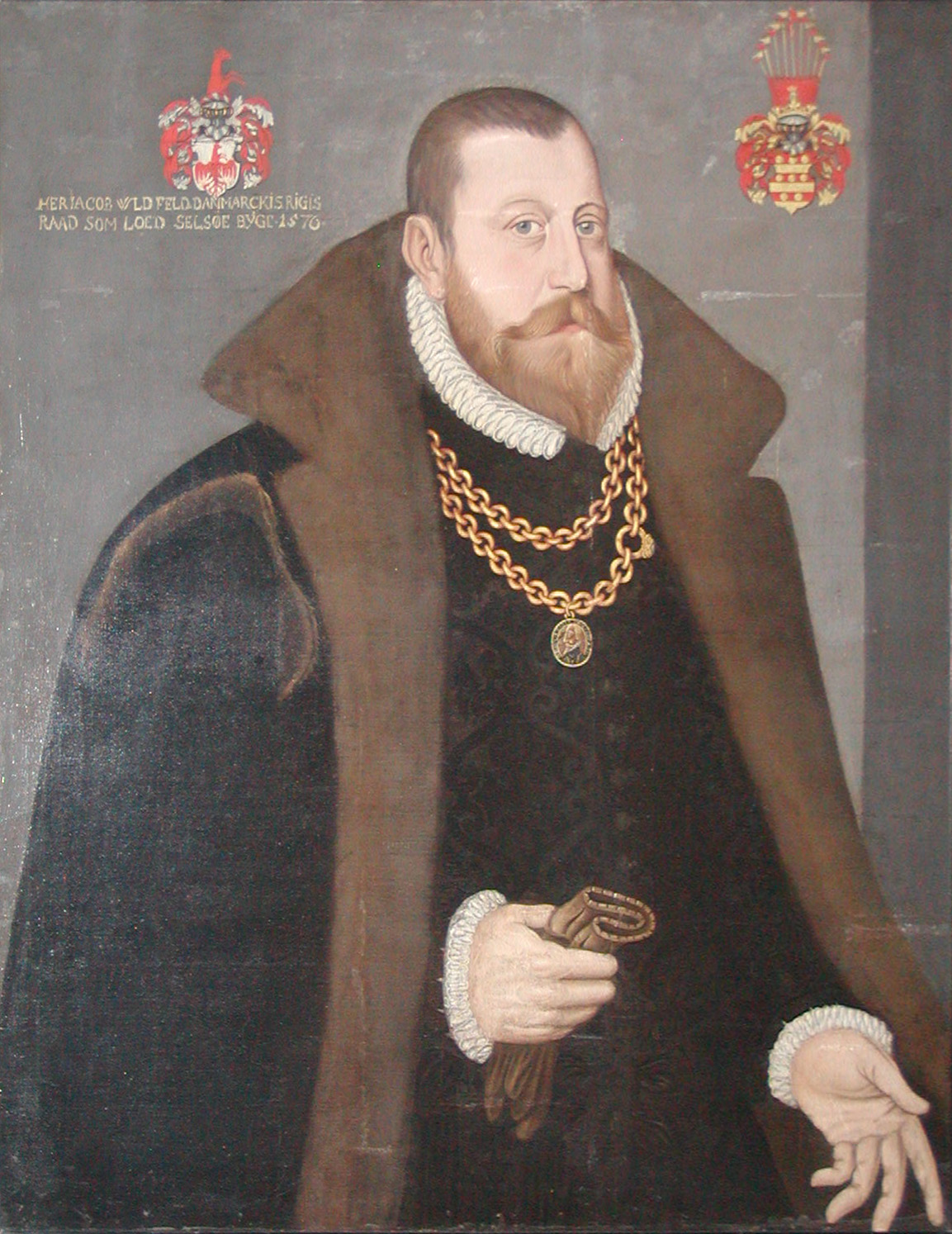
- Portrait of Ulfeldt, late 16th century
- Born: 1535
- Died: 8 October 1593 (aged 57–58)
- Occupation: Danish diplomat

Jacob Ulfeldt (1535 – 8 October 1593) was a Danish diplomat and member of the Privy Council from 1565. He is mostly known for his very troubled diplomatic journey into Russia in 1578 during which he concluded an unfavourable treaty with Tsar Ivan IV (1530–1584) that brought him to disgrace at home. His bitter attempts of getting satisfaction only damaged his case. However, his account of his Russian travels (published by Melchior Goldast in Latin during 1608) is still considered a main source of Danish-Russian relations as well as of 16th-century Russia. He was the father of Jacob Ulfeldt (1567–1630).

== Early life and education ==
Ulfeldt was the son of Knud Ebbesen Ulfeldt and Anne Eriksdatter Hardenberg. He studied at Louvain in 1551 and Wittenberg in 1554.

== Diplomatic career ==
Ulfeldt entered the state service in 1562. In 1566, he became a member of the Rigsrådet. He is mostly known for his very troubled diplomatic journey into Russia in 1578 during which he concluded an unfavourable treaty with Tsar Ivan IV (1530–1584) that brought him to disgrace at home. His bitter attempts of getting satisfaction only damaged his case.

== Gallery ==
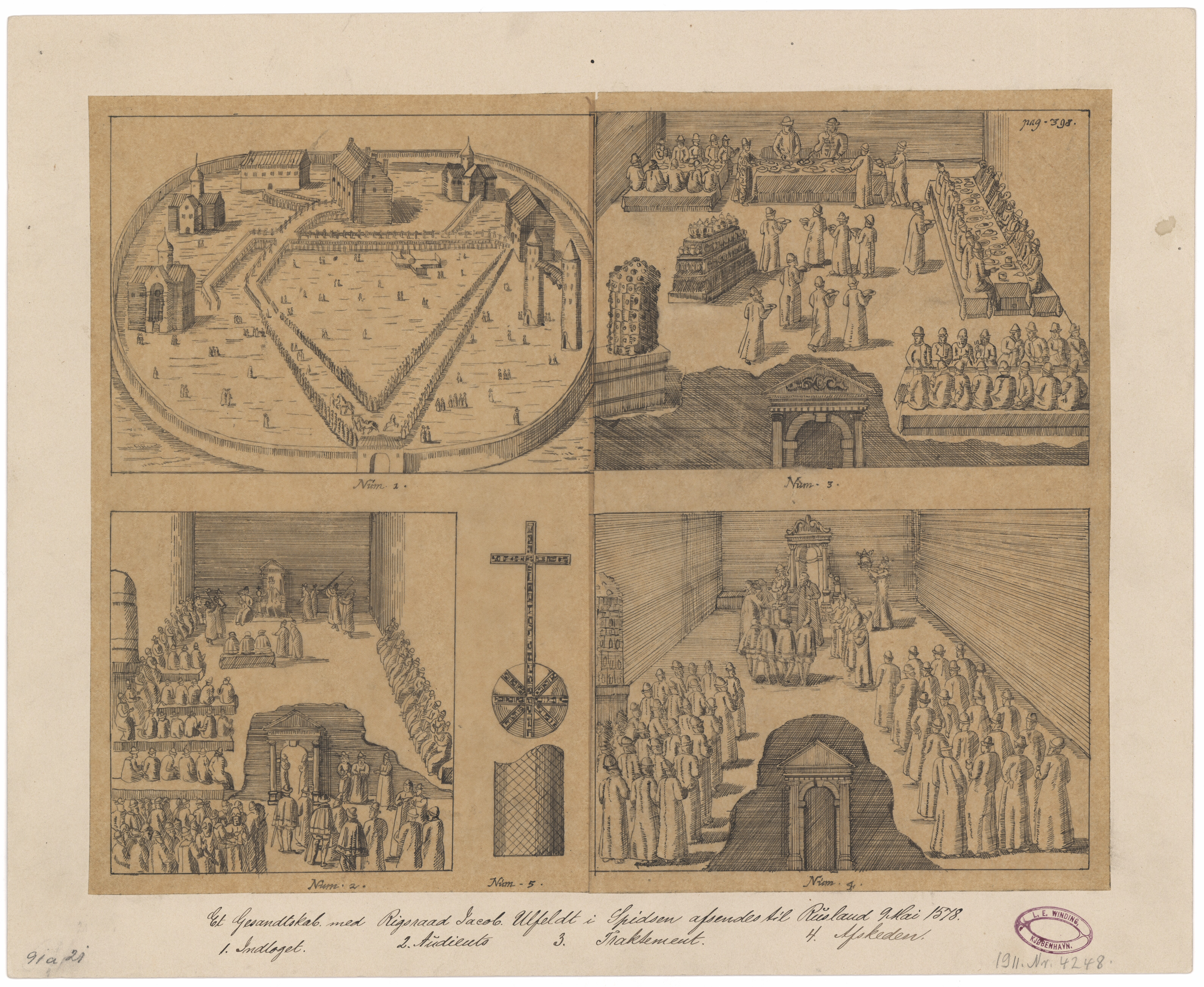
Hacob Ylfeldt's departure for Russia.

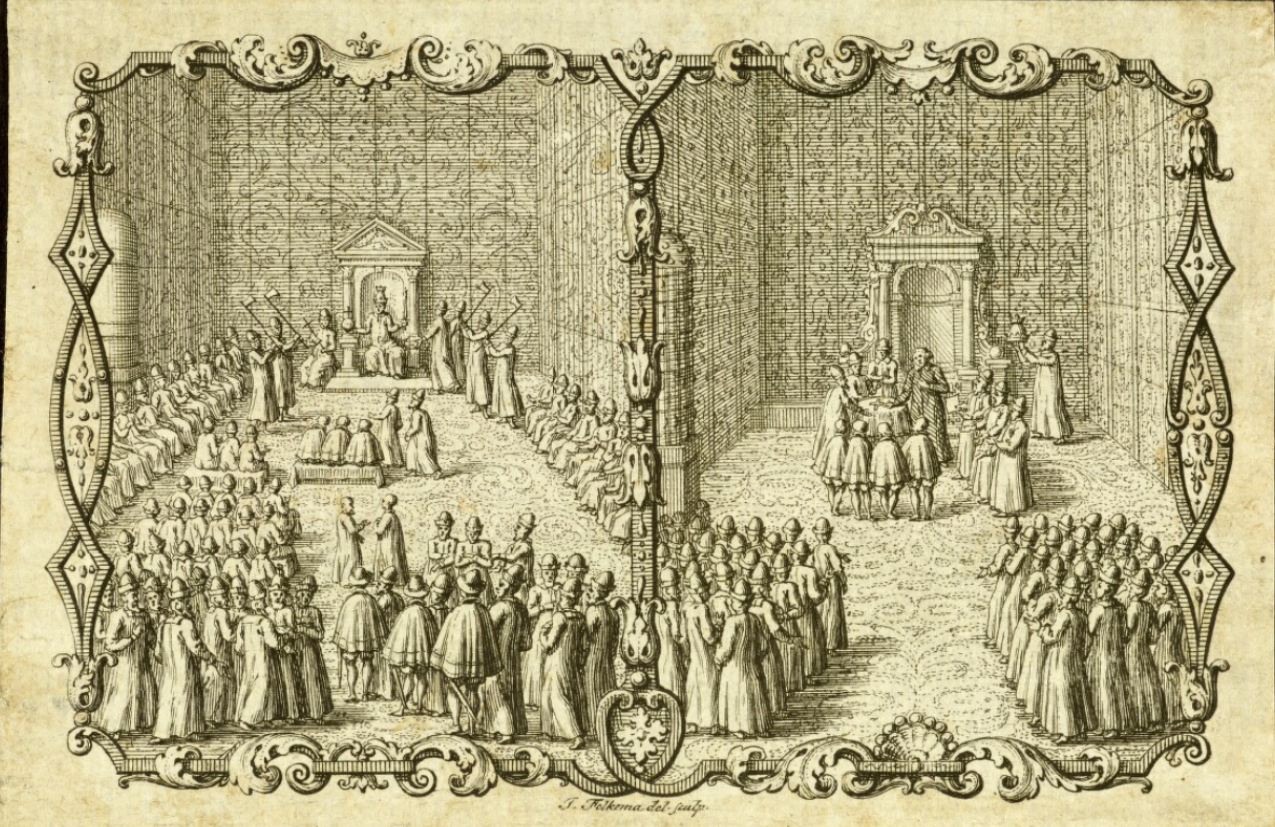
Ulfeldt being received by Tsar Ivan IV.

== Property ==
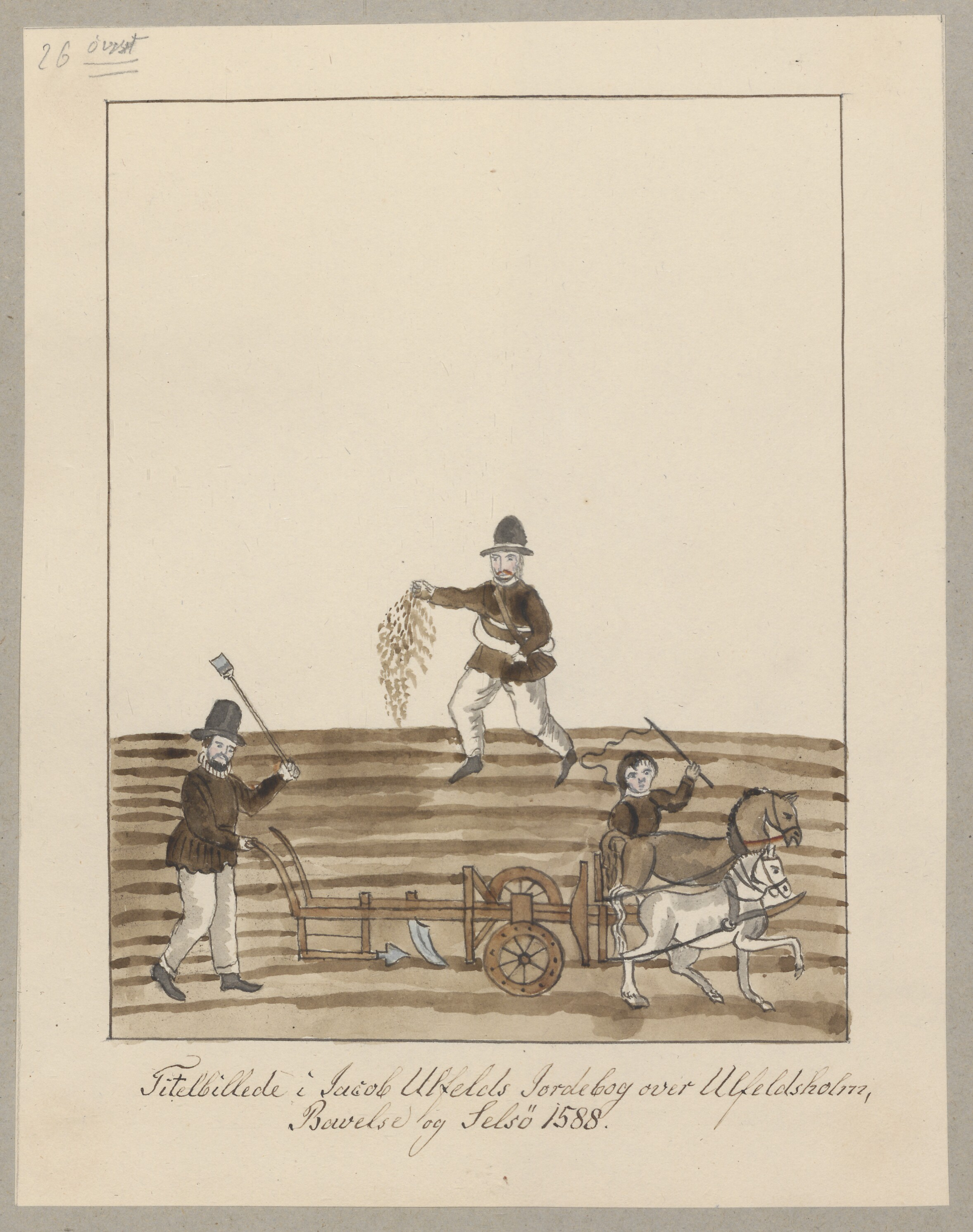
Title leaf of Jacob Ulfeldt's Jordebog of Ulfeldsholm, Bavelse and Selsø 1588

Ylfeldt's wife brought the estate Bavelse into the marriage. In 1566, Ulfeldt inherited Kogsbølle on Funen and Selsø in Hornsherred. He constructed new main buildings on all three estates. He purchased Dronninglund Castle in Jutland in 1563 but sold it again in 1568.

== Personal life ==
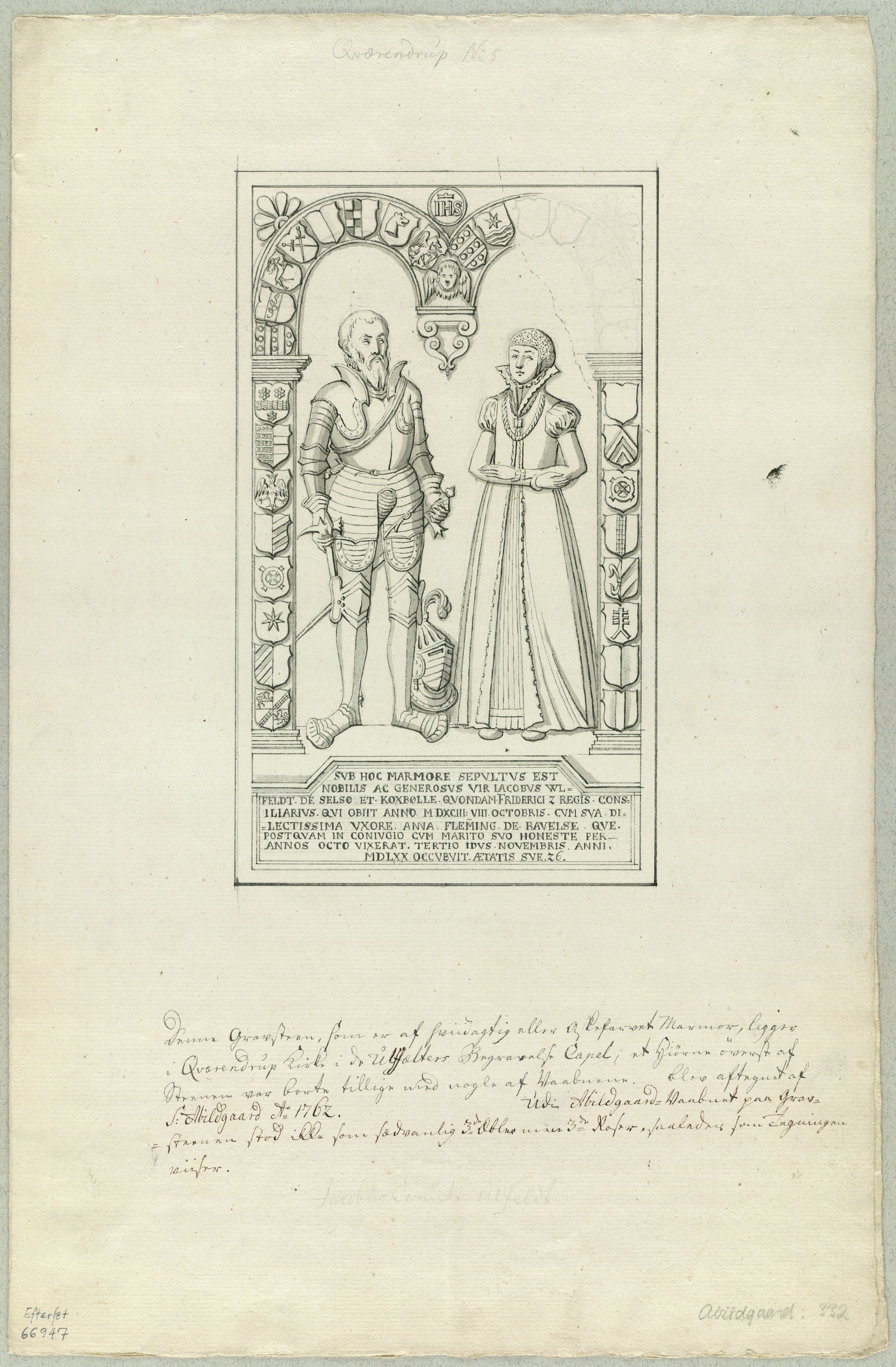
Ledgerstone of Jacob Ulfeldt and Anne Hardenberg in Kværndrup Church.

Ulfeldt was married to Anne Jakobsdatter Flemming (1544-1570) and had three sons; Mogens Ulfeldt (1569–1616), Jacob Ulfeldt (1567–1630) and Corfitz Ulfeldt (1559–1614). Mogens Ulfeldt reached the rank of Admiral of the Realm. Jacob Ulfeldt was a diplomat and chancellor of King Christian IV of Denmark.

== Legacy ==
Ylfeldt's account of his Russian travels (published by Melchior Goldast in Latin during 1608) is still considered a main source of Danish-Russian relations as well as of 16th century Russia.

== See also ==
- Livonian War

== Other sources ==
- Dansk Biografisk Leksikon, vol. 15, Copenh. 1984.
- Schlegel, B.; Klingspor, C.A. Den med sk ldebref f rl nade men ej Riddarhuset introducerade Svenska Adelns ttar-taflor. Samlade och utarbetade af B. Schlegel och C. A. Klingspor. p. 311. ISBN 9780543959577.
