= Gangs in Chicago =

Gang activities in Chicago, Illinois, United States

Chicago was described by a 2011 law enforcement report as "the most gang-occupied city in the United States," with 150,000 gang-affiliated residents, representing more than 100 gangs. Gangs were responsible for 61% of the homicides in Chicago in 2011.

In 2025 the Cook County Medical Examiner's Office reported a 30% drop in homicides in Chicago from January 1st, through June 30th. The city also saw about a 39% decrease in overall shootings from roughly the first six months of 2024 (1,029) to this year (623), according to data from the Chicago Police Department. Murders were also down 31% YoY.

== History ==
The first gangs in Chicago were loosely organized groups of European immigrants in the late 1800s.

In 1910, Big Jim Colosimo founded the Chicago Outfit on the South Side.

The Maxwell Street area became a center of Jewish-American organized crime in America, when the area was dominated by Eastern European Jewish immigrants from the 1880s to the 1920s. Like other ethnic groups in the area, the Jews organized themselves into gangs. The Chicago Tribune in 1906 referred to the Maxwell Street area as "the crime center of the country". Other contemporary news reports refer to it as "Bloody Maxwell" and "the Wickedest Police District in the World." Independent Jewish groups ran by gangsters like Jules Portuguese, Davy Miller and Benjamin Zuckerman ran the Maxwell Street and greater Lawndale areas. Later Chicago Outfit affiliated Jews like Leonard Patrick and David Yaras took over the area when they killed Zuckerman and unseated his organization.

In the early 1950s, immigration to Chicago had picked up considerably, namely to the West Side and parts of the South Side with many coming from Puerto Rico. Demographic shifts and conflicts around this time led to the formation of many gangs, and the inception of a broader gang culture in Humboldt Park, and around other parts of the city.

In the 1970s, gang-related crime and violence spiked, particularly with Hispanic-on-Hispanic homicides increasing in the summer of 1971 due to Latin Kings gang election meetings.

In July 2021, federal agents participating in Operation Legend arrested 27 Black Disciples gang members associated with drugs and gun violations in the Englewood neighborhood on the South Side of Chicago.

In the first six months of 2025, Chicago saw a 33% reduction in homicides and a 38% reduction in shootings.

PBS interviewed Jeff Asher, co-founder of AH Datalytics' Real-time Crime Index. While noting that the cause of the decrease in violent crime is unknown, ("It's literally a billion-dollar question in terms of if you knew the amount of resources and effort that you would put into it would be tremendous"), Asher reported that after COVID, the US had increased spending on social programs: a 90% increase in construction from local and state governments on social and neighborhood centers, a 50% increase in public safety spending construction, and a 20% increase in highway spending from state and local governments. He speculated that these investments in troubled neighborhoods may have helped reduce crime rates.

== Causes ==
Lack of opportunity and economic oppression especially in the form of redlining by Chicago's city hall and banks has caused working class citizens to turn to the sale of illicit drugs for income. Former Chicago Police Superintendent, Garry McCarthy, blamed Chicago's gang culture for its high rates of homicide and other violent crime, stating "It's very frustrating to know that it's like 7% of the population causes 80% of the violent crime... The gangs here are traditional gangs that are generational, if you will. The grandfather was a gang member, the father's a gang member, and the kid right now is going to be a gang member".

== Structure ==
Most traditional Chicago street gangs, known as nations, fall under two main factions, called the People Nation and the Folk Nation. The People Nation has most, if not all, of its gangs under the "Almighty" moniker. The Folk Nation has most of its gangs divided into various sub-factions, the majority of which belong to an alliance called Latin Folks which are further divided into groups called Families. There are nations that are independent of both the Folk Nation and People Nation, such as the Black Soul Nation.

Street gangs that are independent of Folks and People but retain similar identifiers and symbolism as well as maintain a hierarchical structure in membership are known as war crews. They do not identify as nations though they will engage in traditional gang activity and may conflict with nations as well as other crews. Street gangs that do not retain any semblance of traditional nations or war crews are known simply as cliques. Each individual gang is divided into sets which are territories spanning blocks or neighborhoods that may be combined to form supersets or divided further into subsets. Typically, a single set is based at a single intersection of city streets. There are currently over 90 active Chicago street gangs, with over 747 sets that have been identified by law enforcement.

== Modern street gangs ==
Chicago-based street gang nations post-establishment of the Folk Nation and People Nation are as follows:

=== Folk Nation ===
- Ambrose
- Ashland Vikings
- Black Disciples
- Boss Pimps
- Brazers
- C-Notes
- Campbell Boys
- Gangster Disciples
- Harrison Gents
- Imperial Gangsters
- Insane Deuces
- Insane Dragons
- Insane Gangster Satan Disciples
- Insane Guess Boys
- North Side Insane Popes
- Insane Two-Two Nation
- Insane Two One Boys
- King Cobras
- Krazy Getdown Boys
- La Raza Nation
- Latin Disciples
- Latin Dragon Nation
- Latin Eagles
- Latin Jivers
- Latin Lovers
- Latin Souls
- Latin Stylers
- Milwaukee Kings
- Morgan Boys
- Maniac Latin Disciples
- Orquesta Albany
- Outlaw Gangsters
- Party People
- Racine Boys
- Ridgeway Lords
- Simon City Royals
- Sin City Boys
- Spanish Cobras
- Spanish Gangster Disciples
- Gangster Two-Six
- YLO Cobras
- YLO Disciples

=== People Nation ===
- Almighty Saints
- Almighty Vice Lord Nation
- Bishops
- Black P. Stones
- Chi-West
- Familia Stones
- Four Corner Hustlers
- South Side Insane Popes
- Insane Unknowns
- Latin Angels
- Latin Brothers
- Latin Counts
- Latin Kings
- Latin Pachucos
- Latin Stones
- Mickey Cobras
- Noble Knights
- Party Players
- Spanish Lords
- Spanish Vice Lords
- Stoned Freaks
- Twelfth Street Players
- Villa Loboes

=== Independent Nations ===
- Black Gangsters
- Black Souls
- TAP Boyz
- Jousters

== See also ==
- Crime in Chicago
- Gangs in the United States

== Bibliography ==
- Russo, Gus (2002). The Outfit: The Role of Chicago's Underworld in the Shaping of Modern America. Bloomsbury USA. ISBN 1-58234-279-2.
