= Larry Hoover =

American gang leader (born 1950)

- Born: November 30, 1950 (age 75); Jackson, Mississippi, U.S.
- Other name: King Larry
- Spouse: Winndye Jenkins (m. 2020)
- Children: 3
- Status: Imprisoned
- Convictions: Murder; conspiracy; extortion; continuing to engage in a criminal enterprise
- Penalty: Six life sentences (federal; commuted); 150-200 years (state Illinois)

Details
- Date apprehended: September 21, 1973

Larry Hoover Sr. (born November 30, 1950) is an American former gangster and street gang kingpin. He is the founder of the Gangster Disciples, a Chicago street gang that over the years extended to multiple cities throughout the United States.

Hoover was serving six life sentences at the ADX Florence prison facility in Fremont County, Colorado. He was already serving a sentence of 150 to 200 years for a conviction in Illinois state court for the 1973 murder of 19-year-old William Young. However, in 1997, following a 17-year investigation, he was convicted of an additional 40 counts, including conspiracy, extortion, money laundering, and running a continuing criminal enterprise from inside the state prison, and received additional life terms in federal court. He has made multiple attempts to have his sentence shortened.

American rapper and fellow Chicago native Kanye West has been a longtime advocate to lessen Hoover's sentence. West urged President Donald Trump to do so at a televised White House event in 2018, hosted the Free Larry Hoover Benefit Concert alongside Drake in late 2021, and referenced Hoover in songs such as "Jesus Lord" and "River".

On May 28, 2025, President Trump commuted his federal prison sentence. However, Hoover must still serve his 150-to-200-year state sentence for his 1973 murder conviction, but is eligible to seek parole on that charge since the crime was committed before Illinois abolished discretionary parole in 1978. According to the Chicago Sun-Times, parole is not out of question for Hoover as the Illinois Prisoner Review Board between 2010 and 2020 released roughly 50 elderly inmates serving time for murder convictions under older state laws.

== Early and personal life ==
Hoover was born on November 30, 1950, in Jackson, Mississippi. When he was four, his family moved to Chicago, Illinois. At the age of 13, Hoover formed a gang called the Supreme Gangsters with childhood best friend Ike Taylor and older mentor Andrew Howard. The Supreme Gangsters were more into dressing and hanging out before moving onto petty crimes before eventually becoming a mafia syndicate type of group towards the 70’s. He dropped out of high school after being shot by a rival Disciple at the beginning of the 1968 school year. He also fathered two children Larry Bernard & Larry Jr.

== Biography ==
=== Gang and impact ===
In 1969, Hoover and David Barksdale, the leader of the Black Disciples, called a truce and decided to combine both of their respective rival gangs (Supreme Gangsters and Black Disciples) together to become the Black Gangster Disciple Nation (BGDN). The BGDN participated in political rallies, protests against police brutality, free breakfast and lunch for school age children and a GED program for gang members at Malcolm X college as well as all the typical behaviors of a 1960’s street gang.

=== Death of David Barksdale and Disciple takeover ===
In 1974, after Barksdale died of kidney failure stemming from injuries incurred in a 1970 assassination attempt, Hoover took over the reins of the Black Gangster Disciple Nation. In honor of King David he renounced the title of King but deemed himself the leader of the organization. His second in Command Ike Taylor then proclaimed Larry Hoover chairman of the gang in honor of his own relationship to slain Black Panther leader Fred Hampton . At the time, the Disciples had control of Chicago's South Side turf. Under Hoover's rule, the Black Gangster Disciple Nation took over a majority of the Chicago drug trade. In 1978, while incarcerated, Hoover formed the Folks Nation, which added all gangs in his personal likeliness and interest to relate to the BGDN such as the Maniac Latin Disciples, Ambrose, the Two-Two Boys, Gangster Two-Six, Simon City Royals, North Side Insane Popes, La Raza Nation, Spanish Cobras, Imperial Gangsters, Harrison Gents, and the Latin Eagles. The Folks Nation maintained their ground from within prison property to drug-ruffled streets.

While Hoover was incarcerated, he ran the gang's illicit drug trade both in prison and on the streets, starting from Chicago's West Side and later extending throughout the United States. Similarly, certain parts of the affiliated Folks Nation alliance began to expand to parts of the United States Midwest. As of 2022, the Gangster Disciples has confirmed expansions to Indianapolis, Kansas City, Minneapolis, Detroit, Milwaukee, Birmingham, Cincinnati, Memphis and Hoover's birthplace of Jackson.

The Folks Nation, including that of the Black Gangster Disciple Nation, also personified a rivalry with the People Nation, which included other gangs such as the Almighty Black P. Stone Nation (run by Jeff Fort, who today shares the same prison facility as Hoover and is also a Mississippi-born native), Almighty Vice Lord Nation, Latin Kings, Mickey Cobras, South Side Almighty Insane Popes (the South Side faction were rivals with the Simon City Royals, Satan Disciples and Two Six’s, causing them to splinter themselves from the North Side faction), Almighty Saints and the Four Corner Hustlers. The Gangster Disciples also engaged in a city rivalry with a South Memphis crew, the Love Murdering Gangsters (formerly LMG Mafia).

==== From Gangster Disciple to Growth & Development ====
In 1978 Larry Hoover was shipped to Pontiac after successfully organizing a prison protest against the subhuman conditions in stateville. When he arrived at Pontiac he found the conditions were even worse than stateville and within months there was a rebellion at Pontiac, causing Larry Hoover, Ike Taylor, Benny Lee from the vice lords and 14 other gang leader to be charged with the murder of 3 correctional officers and to be placed on death row. While attorney Chokwe Lumumba helped them fight their case, Larry & Ike vowed that they would come up with something for their organization to avoid ever being in this position again. When they were acquitted of all charges in May 1981, they were sent back to stateville and by September of that same year they released “the new concept of organization” which changed the Black Gangster Disciple structure from loosely affiliated Gangstee & Disciple sets/crews with different laws, and gang structures into one standardized formation with 1 common structure and literature. Between 1982 and 1989 Larry Hoover encouraged peace between the BGDs and BDs and tried to get them back into the BGD fold(all would be for naught come 1991). in 1987 Hoover claimed to have renounced his violent criminal past as well as Gangster Disciples as a criminal gang and became an urban political celebrity in Chicago. His good behavior earned him a spot at a minimum security facility in Vienna where he had unprecedented freedom for a convict of his stature. In 1993 Hoover proclaimed that the GD initials had changed to mean "Growth & Development." This change was revealed to the world at a massive picnic in Kankakee Illinois. He had planned on abandoning the drug trade entirely as he had amassed more than enough capital to go legit. He had also planned to formally end the war between the Folks & The People by combining the stars into a 7 instead of a 6 or a 5. Jeff Fort was reportedly on board with this idea.

As of July 2022, Hoover confirms that he no longer affiliates with the Gangster Disciples and wants "no part" of the gang "whatsoever". He also claims that he was "no longer the Larry Hoover people sometimes talk about, or he who is written about in the papers, or the crime figure described by the government." Many believed it was a ruse for his plan to have his sentence reduced or either way appealed.

== Legal history ==
=== 1973: William Young murder ===
On the evening of February 26, 1973, William "Pooky" Young, a 19-year-old alleged drug dealer, was abducted and shot dead in an alley near 68th Street and Union Avenue in Englewood, a neighborhood on the South Side of Chicago. His killing was ordered by Hoover after his name was mentioned as one of three people accused of stealing drugs and money from the gang six days earlier. Andrew Howard was arrested on March 16, 1973, while Hoover went into hiding in Chicago. On September 21, 1973, Hoover was driving a stolen truck and was asked to stop for a traffic violation. He tried to run away from the scene but was arrested. The police discovered that he was also wanted in William Young's murder. In October 1973, Howard and Hoover were both indicted for murder and in December both were sentenced to 150 to 200 years in prison. Hoover was sent to Stateville Correctional Center in Crest Hill, Illinois, to serve out his term.

=== 1997: Criminal enterprise conviction ===
While in prison for murder, on August 22, 1995, after a 17-year undercover joint investigation by the Illinois Department of Corrections, Federal Bureau of Investigation, Bureau of Alcohol, Tobacco, Firearms and Explosives, Hoover was indicted for conspiracy, extortion, money laundering, drug-related offenses, and continuing to engage in a criminal enterprise. A lengthy federal investigation using wiretaps led to Hoover getting arrested. Prosecutors alleged that his gang had 30,000 "soldiers" in 35 states and made $100 million a year. He was arrested at the Dixon Correctional Center by federal agents, and moved to the Metropolitan Correctional Center in downtown Chicago to stand trial. In 1997, Hoover was found guilty on all charges. He was sentenced to three additional life terms in federal prison. Hoover was serving his sentence at the ADX Florence in Fremont County, Colorado.

=== Attempts to appeal ===
In 2021, Hoover, having hired Bill Cosby's former attorney, Jennifer Bonjean, tried to appeal his sentence under the First Step Act, but was denied by U.S. Judge Harry Leinenweber.

=== Federal commutation ===
On May 28, 2025, Hoover's federal life sentences were commuted by President Donald Trump.

== Other endeavors ==
=== Book ===
In 1996, Hoover's teachings were published in a book titled The Blueprint of a New Concept: From Gangster Disciple to Growth & Development.

=== The Larry Hoover Project ===
In 2014, Winndye Jenkins-Hoover, who had been Hoover's partner since 1968, created the Larry Hoover Project, aimed to give her husband clemency and have his criminal history reviewed.

=== Kanye West involvement ===
Chicago rapper Kanye West has, for over a decade, been a vocal advocate for Hoover's release from prison. On a demo version of his song "Hurricane", which was meant to appear on his since-scrapped project, Yandhi, West suggested calling his ex-wife, Kim Kardashian, to help release Hoover, following Kardashian's success on working on U.S. president Donald Trump to free a number of federal prisoners. On October 11, 2018, during a luncheon with Trump, West pleaded for clemency for Hoover.

West's 2021 album, Donda, contains the track, "Jesus Lord", and its remix, "Jesus Lord, Pt. 2", which both feature a recorded message by Hoover's son, Larry Jr., in which he discusses the "cracks" in America's criminal justice system, and talks about the impact of Hoover's incarceration on his family. Three months later, on December 9, 2021, West, along with fellow rapper Drake, hosted a Free Larry Hoover Benefit Concert at the Los Angeles Memorial Coliseum; it was livestreamed via Amazon Prime Video. Drake's performance and cry for Hoover's clemency was accidentally edited off of the original stream, but was later revised. The main goal of the concert was to bring awareness to Hoover's case; West and Drake called for the release of Hoover and sought to raise awareness about prison and sentencing reform in the United States. Though West and Drake had previously been involved in an ongoing rivalry, they decided to put a temporary end to their feud, focusing on putting their fame and influence to use by bringing awareness to Hoover's case by organizing the benefit concert.

West also advocates for both Young Thug and Hoover's release on the track "River" (of his collaborative album with Ty Dolla Sign, Vultures 2) with the lyrics "Free Larry, free Young Thug".

== In popular culture ==
Hoover appears via phone from prison on multiple skits of Geto Boys' 1996 album, The Resurrection, where he discusses his views on the prison system and the youth of the black community. By association with the Geto Boys, Rap-A-Lot Records founder J. Prince has shown support for Hoover following his incarceration and as of 2022, is calling for him to be pardoned.

Rapper Rick Ross has mentioned Hoover and Black Mafia Family co-founder Big Meech by names on the chorus of his 2010 Teflon Don single, "B.M.F. (Blowin' Money Fast)": "I think I'm Big Meech, Larry Hoover / Whippin' work, hallelujah".

Hoover is mentioned in rapper Killer Mike's 2023 song "Down by Law," which serves as the opening track of his album Michael, which won the Grammy Award for Best Rap Album in 2024.

== See also ==
- List of people granted executive clemency in the second Trump presidency
