= Crime in Chicago =

Chicago
- Crime rates* (2024)

Violent crimes
- Homicide: 21.1
- Rape: 76.0
- Robbery: 336.4
- Aggravated assault: 240.0
- Total violent crime: 673.5

Property crimes
- Burglary: 282.2
- Larceny-theft: 748.1
- Motor vehicle theft: 801.6
- Note: Reported crimes per 100,000 population Source: Chicago Crime statistics (2024)

Crime in Chicago has been tracked by the Chicago Police Department's Bureau of Records since the beginning of the 20th century.

The city's overall crime rate, especially the violent crime rate, is higher than the US average. Gangs in Chicago have a role in the city's crime rate. Chicago gangs prefer to do business with Indiana gun stores because Indiana state laws are significantly lenient than Illinois.

The number of homicides in Chicago hit a 25-year high in 2021, but reached a five-year low in 2024 with a continued downward trend into 2025.

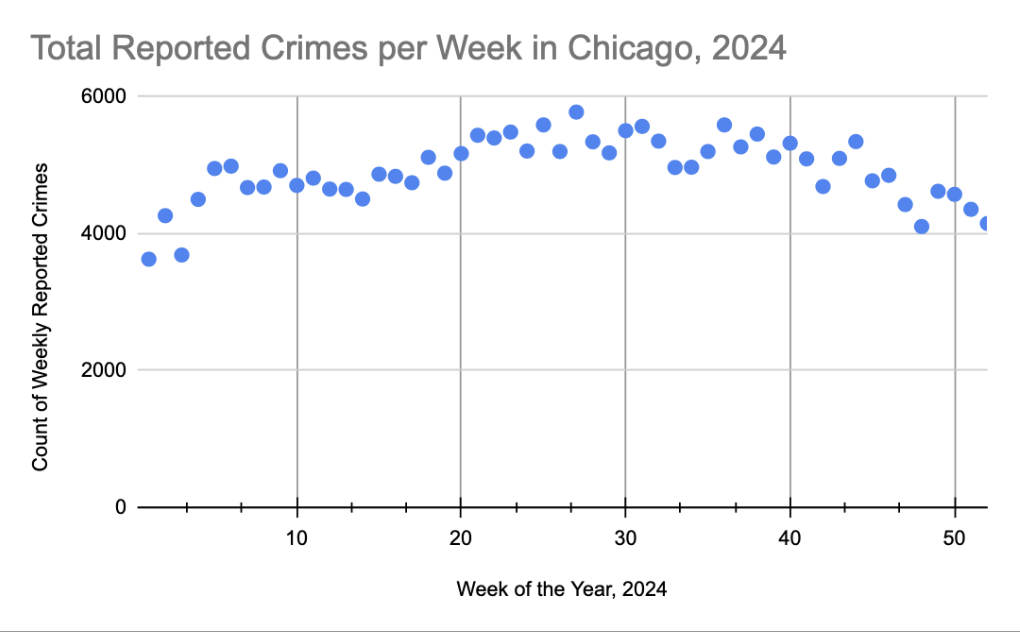
The scatterplot displays the reported crimes in Chicago for each week in 2024

== Overview ==
Chicago saw a major rise in violent crime starting in the late 1960s. Homicides in the city peaked in 1974, with 970 homicides when the city's population was over three million, resulting in a homicide rate of around 29 per 100,000, and again in 1992, with 948 homicides when the city had fewer than three million people, resulting in a homicide rate of 34 per 100,000 citizens.

After 1992, the homicide count steadily decreased to 415 murders by the mid-2000s, a reduction of over 50 percent. In 2021, there were 805 homicides recorded, representing a homicide rate of 29.8 per 100,000. The year of 2022 saw a decline in homicides, followed by another 15% decline in 2023, ending the year with a total of 621.

=== Violent crime ===
Chicago experienced major rises in the 1920s, in the late 1960s, and in the 2020s, a decline in overall crime in the 2000s, and then a rise in murders in 2016. Murder, rape, and robbery are the most common violent crimes in the city, and occurrences of such incidents are documented by the Chicago Police Department and indexed in annual crime reports.

==== Violent Crime Totals 2010-Present ====
Year	Homicide	Shooting	Criminal Sexual Assault	Robbery	Vehicular Hijacking	Aggravated Battery	Aggravated Assault	All Violent Crime
2025	417	1,871	2,011	6,099	571	6,679	8,018	25,287
2024	587	2,853	2,000	9,489	1,148	7,319	9,906	32,709
2023	623	2,991	2,065	11,874	1,540	6,972	9,801	35,207
2022	719	3,533	2,061	8,486	1,937	5,935	9,085	31,024
2021	805	4,457	1,939	6,871	2,151	6,217	8,983	30,555
2020	781	4,090	1,671	7,071	1,684	6,484	7,768	28,729
2019	500	2,639	2,076	8,138	736	6,859	7,149	27,574
2018	579	2,876	2,170	9,855	910	6,556	7,342	29,718
2017	661	3,384	2,106	12,251	1,150	6,314	7,104	32,226
2016	778	4,271	1,954	12,616	809	5,916	7,065	32,556
2015	494	2,922	1,822	10,415	412	5,710	5,577	26,822
2014	425	2,558	1,718	10,620	379	5,517	5,369	26,100
2013	425	2,263	1,652	12,829	429	5,656	5,164	27,943
2012	512	2,955	1,776	14,670	603	6,617	5,896	32,423
2011	441	2,670	1,821	15,085	694	7,638	6,380	34,207
2010	439	2,799	1,727	15,491	687	8,599	6,484	35,717

After adopting crime-fighting techniques in 2004 that were recommended by the Los Angeles Police Department and the New York City Police Department, Chicago recorded 453 homicides, the lowest total since 1965. This homicide rate of 15.8 per 100,000 population was still above the U.S. average, an average which takes in many small towns and suburbs.

By 2010, Chicago's homicide rate had surpassed that of Los Angeles (16.3 per 100,000), and was more than twice that of New York City (7.0 per 100,000). By the end of 2015, Chicago's homicide rate rose to 18.6 per 100,000. By 2016, Chicago had recorded more homicides and shooting victims than New York City and Los Angeles combined. By the end of 2020, Chicago's homicide rate rose to 28.4 per 100,000. Chicago recorded 779 homicides in 2020. This figure represents an increase of more than 55% over 2019. On the Fourth of July weekend 2021, at least 100 people, mostly African-American, were shot, 18 of them fatally.

Chicago's biggest criminal justice challenges have changed little over the last 50 years, and statistically reside with homicide, armed robbery, gang violence, and aggravated battery.

==== Murder and shootings 1991-Present ====
Year	Chicago population (millions)	Murders / Homicides (count)	Murder / Homicide rate (per 100,000 population)	Reported murder clearance rate (%)	Total Shootings (count)	Non-fatal Shootings (count)
2025	2.721	416	15.3			
2024	2.721	586	21.5	56%	2,853	2,336
2023	2.699	623	23.1	52%	2,991	2,430
2022	2.684	719	26.8	50%	3,533	2,887
2021	2.706	805	29.7	50%	4,457	3,707
2020	2.746	781	28.4	45.8%	4,090	3,390
2019	2.694	500	18.6	53.4%	2,639	2,193
2018	2.701	579	21.4	45.1%	2,876	2,395
2017	2.711	661	24.4	34.8%	3,384	2,780
2016	2.717	778	28.6	20.1%	4,271	3,576
2015	2.724	494	18.1	26%	2,922	2,489
2014	2.727	425	15.6		2,558	2,193
2013	2.726	425	15.6		2,263	1,910
2012	2.719	512	18.8		2,955	2,515
2011	2.708	441	16.3	34%	2,670	2,300
2010	2.696	439	16.3	33.9%	2,799	2,445
2009	2.851	461	16.2	34.7%		
2008	2.830	517	18.3			
2007	2.811	448	15.9			
2006	2.806	474	16.9			
2005	2.825	446	15.8			
2004	2.849	453	15.9			
2003	2.866	603	21.0			
2002	2.881	652	22.6			
2001	2.895	671	23.2			
2000	2.896	636	22.0			
1999	2.799	640	22.9			
1998	2.803	709	25.3			
1997	2.808	758	27.0			
1996	2.814	798	28.4			
1995	2.801	821	29.3			
1994	2.797	932	33.3			
1993	2.794	867	31.0			
1992	2.792	948	34.0			
1991	2.790	930	33.3			

Homicide statistics

1928: 498	1957: 296	1958: 305	1959: 331	1960: 372
1961: 362	1962: 385	1963: 361	1964: 390	1965: 400 or 396
1966: 510	1967: 553	1968: 647	1969: 717	1970: 810
1971: 824	1972: 716	1973: 864	1974: 970	1975: 819
1976: 821	1977: 829	1978: 784	1979: 856	1980: 863
1981: 877	1982: 668	1983: 729	1984: 741	1985: 666
1986: 744	1987: 691	1988: 660	1989: 742	1990: 851

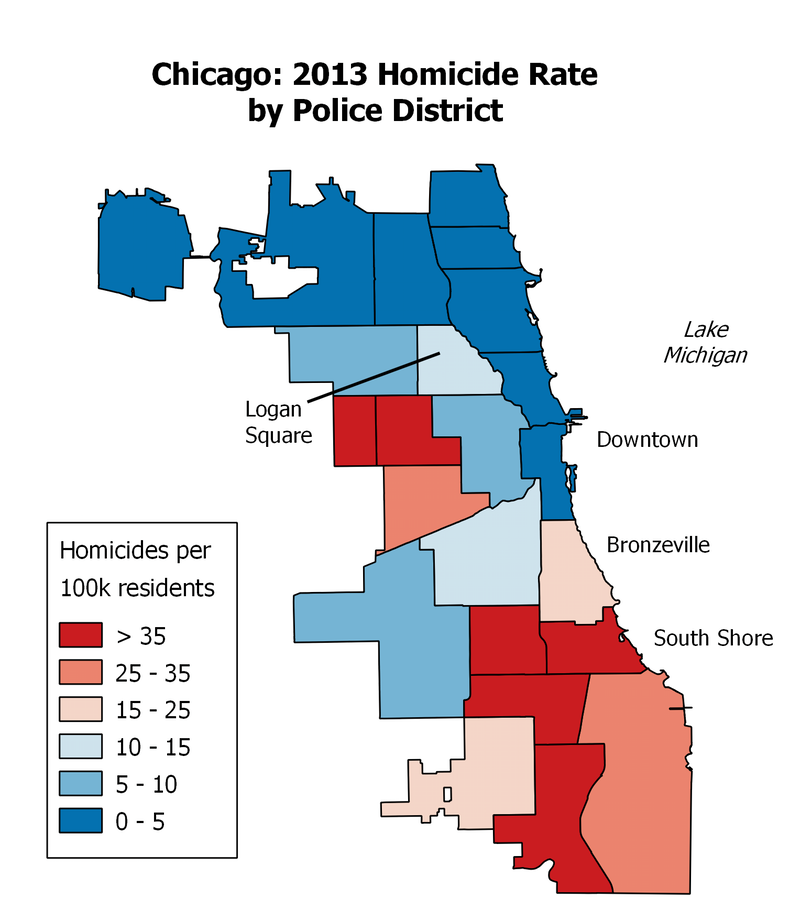
The Chicago homicide rate by police district (click to enlarge)

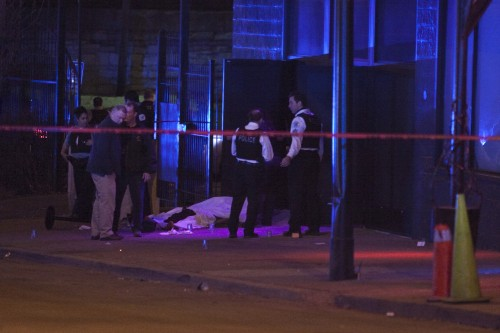
CPD working a murder crime scene in Englewood, 2015

Former Chicago Police Superintendent Garry McCarthy said a pervasive "no-snitch code" on the street remains the biggest reason more murders aren't being solved in Chicago, adding, "We're not doing well because we're not getting cooperation [...] They don't feel protected when they come forward. They feel that police will throw them under a bus, and they still have to live in the neighborhood." By 2016, Chicago's murder clearance rate had dropped to only 21%, and its detective force had dwindled from 1,151 in 2009 to 863 as of July 2016. Warmer months have significantly higher homicide rates, and over 70% of homicides take place between 7 pm and 5 am.

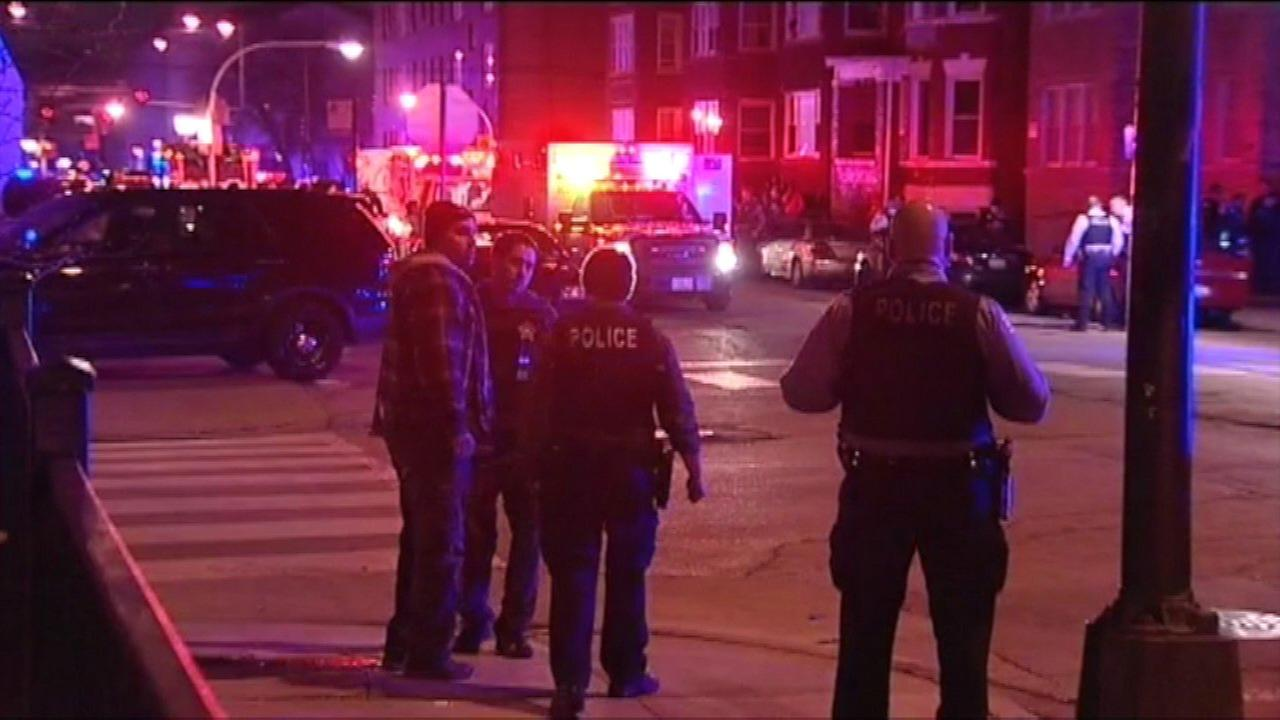
Crime scene from a CPD shootout with an armed suspect in 2016

In 2011, 83% of homicides involved a firearm, and 6.4% were the result of a stabbing. 10% of homicides in 2011 were the result of an armed robbery and at least 60% were gang or gang narcotics altercations. Over 40% of victims and 60% of offenders were between the ages of 17 and 25. 90.1% of victims were male. 75.3% of victims and 70.5% of offenders were African American, 18.9% were Hispanic (20.3% of offenders), and whites were 5.6% of victims (3.5% of offenders).

Chicago Police Superintendent Garry McCarthy was terminated by Rahm Emanuel following the fall out from the shooting of Laquan McDonald.

A map of homicides and Level 1 Trauma Centers in Chicago, 2018

A gunshot wound to the body's center of mass can quickly prove fatal without immediate medical attention due to blood loss and internal injuries. In September 2015, University of Chicago Medicine and Sinai Health Systems announced a joint $40 million venture to convert Holy Cross Hospital into a Level 1 trauma center on the South side, making some of Chicago's most violent neighborhoods less than five miles from high-quality care. Non-fatal gunshot victims in Chicago had an overall rate of occurrence of 46.5 per 100,000 from 2006 to 2012, with a demographic breakdown of 1.62 per 100,000 for whites; 28.72 for Hispanics, and 112.83 for blacks. It was estimated in 2013 that the medical expenses associated with gun violence costs the city of Chicago $2.5 billion a year.

August 2016 marked the most violent month Chicago had recorded in over two decades with 92 homicides, included the murder of Nykea Aldridge, cousin of NBA star Dwyane Wade. Chicago's 2016 murder and shooting surge attracted national media attention from CNN, The New York Times, USA Today, Time magazine and PBS. Filmmaker Spike Lee's 2015 release, Chi-Raq, highlights Chicago's gun violence using a narrative inspired by the Greek comedy Lysistrata.

Chicago's deadliest day since reliable digital records began in 1991 was on May 31, 2020, with 18 murders committed. That day was part of a three-day weekend that had 85 shootings, and 24 murders, the all-time highest number killed on a Chicago weekend. Reports indicated that the victims were of various ages and occupations, but mostly Black. The violence was framed by the George Floyd protests, but researchers said it was unheard of and unable to be contextualized. The city's second-deadliest day had 13 murders, and occurred in 1991 shortly after digital records were introduced. There is no deadlier day recorded in the past 60 years, but records prior to 1991 may be unreliable.

== Crime rates by community area ==
The seventy-seven Chicago community areas were defined cooperatively by the U.S. Census Bureau and the University of Chicago Department of Sociology following the 1920 Census. Although there have been substantial changes in population and infrastructure since then, the community areas remain the most widely used geographic units by Chicago planning agencies, advocacy groups, and service providers.

Homicide rates in Chicago vary greatly depending on the community area. Many of the predominantly African American community areas on the South Side are impoverished, lack educational resources, and are noted for high levels of street gang activity. The community areas of Englewood on the South Side, and Austin on the West side, for example, have homicide rates that are ten times higher than other parts of the city. In September 2015, West Garfield Park was named "America's mass shooting capital", citing 18 occasions in 2015 in which at least four people were shot in a single incident.

Violence in these community areas has had a detrimental impact on the academic performance of children in schools, as well as a higher financial burden for school districts in need of counselors, social workers, and psychiatrists to help children cope with the violence. In 2014, Chicago Public Schools adopted the "Safe Passage Route" program to place unarmed volunteers, police officers and firefighters along designated walking routes to provide security for children en route to school. From 2010 to 2014, 114 school children were murdered in Chicago.

The table below shows population, crime totals and per capita crime rates by community area for 2020, the most recent Census year.

=== General crime rates by community area ===
2025 Chicago crime rates by community area
No.	Name	Crimes	Population	Per Capita	Change 24-25	%Change
01	Rogers Park	1,709	54,173	.0315	▼391	▼19%
02	West Ridge	1,488	78,373	.0190	▼217	▼13%
03	Uptown	1,998	56,344	.0355	▼287	▼13%
04	Lincoln Square	909	41,651	.0218	▼67	▼7%
05	North Center	587	36,014	.0163	▼133	▼18%
06	Lake View	3,416	102,827	.0332	▼540	▼14%
07	Lincoln Park	2,364	67,987	.0348	▼450	▼16%
08	Near North Side	5,990	107,331	.0559	▼44	▼1%
09	Edison Park	98	11,558	.0085	▼10	▼9%
10	Norwood Park	465	39,840	.0117	▼76	▼14%
11	Jefferson Park	302	26,649	.0113	▼138	▼31%
12	Forest Glen	188	19,901	.0094	▼61	▼24%
13	North Park	506	18,356	.0276	▲6	▲1%
14	Albany Park	932	45,538	.0205	▼175	▼16%
15	Portage Park	1,363	63,031	.0216	▼120	▼8%
16	Irving Park	968	53,332	.0182	▼297	▼23%
17	Dunning	523	41,233	.0127	▼137	▼21%
18	Montclare	304	14,280	.0213	▲17	▲6%
19	Belmont Cragin	1,719	72,088	.0238	▼328	▼16%
20	Hermosa	459	22,576	.0203	▼158	▼26%
21	Avondale	1,193	35,533	.0336	▼148	▼11%
22	Logan Square	2,513	71,192	.0353	▼789	▼24%
23	Humboldt Park	2,072	56,153	.0369	▼491	▼19%
24	West Town	3,946	88,164	.0448	▼858	▼18%
25	Austin	4,685	97,452	.0481	▼626	▼12%
26	West Garfield Park	1,142	15,096	.0756	▼124	▼10%
27	East Garfield Park	1,286	20,731	.0620	▼205	▼14%
28	Near West Side	5,181	68,165	.0760	▼524	▼9%
29	North Lawndale	1,947	33,958	.0573	▼533	▼21%
30	South Lawndale	1,338	69,884	.0191	▼387	▼22%
31	Lower West Side	1,185	33,446	.0354	▼258	▼18%
32	Loop (The)	4,458	42,550	.1048	▼465	▼9%
33	Near South Side	992	30,482	.0325	▼213	▼18%
34	Armour Square	564	13,885	.0406	▼10	▼2%
35	Douglas	1,346	21,088	.0638	▲47	▲4%
36	Oakland	349	6,937	.0503	▼46	▼12%
37	Fuller Park	318	2,345	.1356	▲8	▲3%
38	Grand Boulevard	1,459	25,181	.0579	▼314	▼18%
39	Kenwood	939	18,417	.0510	▼91	▼9%
40	Washington Park	952	12,313	.0773	▼98	▼9%
41	Hyde Park	1,509	30,599	.0493	▲95	▲7%
42	Woodlawn	1,542	23,801	.0648	▼90	▼6%
43	South Shore	3,431	53,588	.0640	▼376	▼10%
44	Chatham	2,415	29,942	.0807	▼202	▼8%
45	Avalon Park	449	9,024	.0498	▼81	▼15%
46	South Chicago	1,520	27,551	.0552	▼204	▼12%
47	Burnside	115	2,304	.0499	▲1	▲1%
48	Calumet Heights	614	11,229	.0547	▼61	▼9%
49	Roseland	2,062	36,635	.0563	▼207	▼9%
50	Pullman	453	6,744	.0672	▼71	▼14%
51	South Deering	835	12,854	.0650	▼30	▼3%
52	East Side	580	22,613	.0256	▲21	▲4%
53	West Pullman	1,253	24,549	.0510	▼208	▼14%
54	Riverdale	378	7,518	.0503	▼74	▼16%
55	Hegewisch	334	8,927	.0374	▼23	▼6%
56	Garfield Ridge	713	36,732	.0194	▼271	▼28%
57	Archer Heights	599	13,414	.0447	▼16	▼3%
58	Brighton Park	780	42,994	.0181	▼157	▼17%
59	McKinley Park	466	14,854	.0314	▼107	▼19%
60	Bridgeport	720	33,638	.0214	▼5	▼1%
61	New City	1,446	40,065	.0361	▼319	▼18%
62	West Elsdon	346	17,901	.0193	▼94	▼21%
63	Gage Park	1,011	36,081	.0280	▼44	▼4%
64	Clearing	384	23,629	.0163	▼57	▼13%
65	West Lawn	841	31,942	.0263	▼114	▼12%
66	Chicago Lawn	1,710	54,409	.0314	▼260	▼13%
67	West Englewood	1,485	28,144	.0528	▼285	▼16%
68	Englewood	1,827	23,195	.0788	▼221	▼11%
69	Greater Grand Crossing	2,364	29,143	.0811	▼339	▼13%
70	Ashburn	787	42,007	.0187	▼337	▼30%
71	Auburn Gresham	2,412	43,779	.0551	▼112	▼4%
72	Beverly	401	19,521	.0205	▲24	▲6%
73	Washington Heights	1,120	24,851	.0451	▼251	▼18%
74	Mount Greenwood	179	19,059	.0094	▼13	▼7%
75	Morgan Park	755	20,873	.0362	▼35	▼4%
76	O'Hare	690	14,394	.0479	▼17	▼2%
77	Edgewater	1,485	56,563	.0263	▼329	▼18%
-	Chicago	104,367	2,711,226	.0385	▼14,573	▼12%

=== Homicide rates by community area ===
2025 Chicago homicide rates by community area
No.	Name	Side	Homicides	Population	Rate	Change 24–25
01	Rogers Park	North	3	55,711	5.38	▼5
02	West Ridge	North	2	79,265	2.52	▼2
03	Uptown	North	2	57,464	3.48	0
04	Lincoln Square	North	1	42,271	2.37	▲1
05	North Center	North	1	35,814	2.79	▲1
06	Lake View	North	0	101,739	0	▼2
07	Lincoln Park	North	1	69,099	1.45	0
08	Near North Side	Central	12	101,208	11.86	▲5
09	Edison Park	North	0	11,402	0	0
10	Norwood Park	North	1	39,641	2.52	▲1
11	Jefferson Park	North	0	27,032	0	▼2
12	Forest Glen	North	0	19,855	0	0
13	North Park	North	0	19,855	0	0
14	Albany Park	North	2	47,663	4.20	▼4
15	Portage Park	North	2	64,213	3.11	▲1
16	Irving Park	North	1	53,584	1.87	▼1
17	Dunning	North	0	42,574	0	0
18	Montclare	North	0	13,765	0	0
19	Belmont Cragin	North	4	73,991	5.41	▲1
20	Hermosa	North	0	23,157	0	▼2
21	Avondale	North	3	36,374	8.25	▲3
22	Logan Square	North	2	71,252	2.81	▼1
23	Humboldt Park	West	18	55,416	32.48	▲2
24	West Town	West	3	86,482	3.47	▲1
25	Austin	West	45	100,120	44.95	▼2
26	West Garfield Park	West	13	16,374	79.39	▼5
27	East Garfield Park	West	12	19,901	60.30	▼5
28	Near West Side	West	19	65,581	28.97	▲4
29	North Lawndale	West	20	30,409	65.77	▼8
30	South Lawndale	West	13	69,708	18.65	▼11
31	Lower West Side	West	3	34,237	8.76	▼5
32	Loop (The)	Central	7	41,671	16.80	▲3
33	Near South Side	Central	4	28,216	14.18	▲1
34	Armour Square	South	2	13,228	15.12	▼3
35	Douglas	South	4	21,355	18.73	▼5
36	Oakland	South	0	6,977	0	▼2
37	Fuller Park	South	3	2,219	135.20	▲1
38	Grand Boulevard	South	3	24,813	12.09	▼4
39	Kenwood	South	0	18,637	0	▼2
40	Washington Park	South	6	12,366	48.52	▼4
41	Hyde Park	South	2	29,559	6.77f	0
42	Woodlawn	South	7	23,865	29.33	▼6
43	South Shore	South	23	55,754	41.22	▼10
44	Chatham	South	11	31,382	35.05	▼14
45	Avalon Park	South	2	9,606	20.82	▼1
46	South Chicago	South	8	30,315	26.39	▼8
47	Burnside	South	2	2,246	89.05	▲2
48	Calumet Heights	South	5	12,087	41.37	0
49	Roseland	South	18	37,610	47.86	▼6
50	Pullman	South	0	6,856	0	▼4
51	South Deering	South	5	15,218	32.86	▲2
52	East Side	South	6	23,870	25.14	▲4
53	West Pullman	South	8	25,449	31.44	▼11
54	Riverdale	South	8	7,817	102.34	▲7
55	Hegewisch	South	2	9,097	21.99	▲2
56	Garfield Ridge	South	1	36,401	2.75	▼3
57	Archer Heights	South	2	13,867	14.42	▲2
58	Brighton Park	South	3	42,243	7.10	▼2
59	McKinley Park	South	1	15,479	6.46	▼1
60	Bridgeport	South	3	33,186	9.04	0
61	New City	South	6	40,971	14.64	▼9
62	West Elsdon	South	0	18,366	0	▼1
63	Gage Park	South	4	34,788	11.50	▼4
64	Clearing	South	1	24,728	4.04	▲1
65	West Lawn	South	2	32,594	6.14	▲2
66	Chicago Lawn	South	5	52,464	9.53	▼9
67	West Englewood	South	8	25,772	31.04	▼9
68	Englewood	South	12	21,378	56.13	▼9
69	Greater Grand Crossing	South	22	28,991	75.89	▼14
70	Ashburn	South	2	42,745	4.68	▼4
71	Auburn Gresham	South	20	44,878	44.57	▼10
72	Beverly	South	1	19,781	5.06	0
73	Washington Heights	South	3	26,456	11.34	▼5
74	Mount Greenwood	South	0	19,121	0	0
75	Morgan Park	South	5	20,724	24.13	▲4
76	O'Hare	North	0	13,997	0	0
77	Edgewater	North	4	56,099	7.13	▲1
-	Chicago	-	524	2,711,226	19.33	▼165

== Street gangs ==
Chicago has an estimated population of over 100,000 active gang members from nearly 60 factions according to studies from 2011/2012. Gangs were responsible for 32% of the homicides in Chicago in 2011, however this has fluctuated over time. In 2023, 24% of criminal homicides could be attributed to a gang altercation, a decrease from 2022's 30%.

Former Chicago Police Superintendent Garry McCarthy blamed Chicago's gang culture in 2015 for its high rates of homicide and other violent crime, stating "It's very frustrating to know that it's like 7% of the population causes 80% of the violent crime...The gangs here are traditional gangs that are generational, if you will. The grandfather was a gang member, the father's a gang member, and the kid right now is going to be a gang member."

Mayor Rahm Emanuel disbanded the Chicago Police Department's anti-gang unit in 2012 in order to focus on beat patrols, which he said would have a more long-term solution to violence than anti-gang units.

As many as 70 active and inactive Chicago street gangs with 753 factions were identified in 2016. Some of the gangs that contribute most of the crime on the streets of Chicago:

- Gangster Disciples
- Vice Lords
- Black P. Stones
- Latin Kings
- Black Disciples
- Maniac Latin Disciples
- Spanish Cobras
- Almighty Saints
- Spanish Gangster Disciples
- Four Corner Hustlers
- Norridge Hearts

Detailed analysis of the homicides timeline by month show that homicides (of all races) went up right after Martin Luther King was killed in 1968 (still for reasons unknown). However, Hispanic-on-Hispanic homicides, did not notably start until the summer of 1971, due to the Latin Kings gang election meetings. However, this claim can't be immediately proven, as homicides by race are not made public for those time periods.

== Political corruption ==
Chicago has a long history of public corruption that regularly draws the attention of federal law enforcement and federal prosecutors. Chicago's political landscape has been firmly under the control of the Democratic Party for over 85 years and has been widely described as a political machine. In the 1980s, the FBI's Operation Greylord uncovered massive and systemic corruption in Chicago's judicial system. Greylord was the longest and most successful undercover operation in the history of the FBI, and resulted in 92 federal indictments, including 17 judges, 48 lawyers, eight policemen, ten deputy sheriffs, eight court officials, and one state legislator. Nearly all were convicted on a variety of charges including bribery, kickbacks, fraud, vote buying, racketeering, and drug trafficking.

The late 1980s and 1990s saw further efforts by the FBI to prosecute Chicago's public crime syndicates. Operation Incubator obtained about a dozen convictions or guilty pleas, including those from five members of the City Council and an aide to former Mayor Harold Washington. Later Operation Gambat brought a wide range of charges against a Chicago judge, a state senator, an alderman, and two others relating to corruption in the Cook County Circuit Court, the Illinois Senate, and the Chicago City Council. Four were convicted and a fifth died during trial. The most extensive operation by the FBI of the 1990s, Operation Silver Shovel, sought to uncover corruption within Chicago labor unions, organized crime, and other city government officials. Operation Silver Shovel resulted in the conviction of six Chicago aldermen and a dozen other local officials on a wide range of corruption related charges.

From 2012 to 2019, 33 Chicago aldermen were convicted on corruption charges, roughly one third of those elected in the time period. A report from the Office of the Legislative Inspector General noted that over half of Chicago's elected alderman took illegal campaign contributions in 2013. In 2015, mayor appointed Barbara Byrd-Bennett, the CEO of Chicago Public Schools, was convicted in a $23 million kickback scheme and was sentenced to seven and a half years in prison. In addition to the Bennett conviction, a joint investigative report issued by the Office of the Inspector General and federal authorities documented widespread corruption within Chicago Public Schools in 2015. The audit noted the criminal shakedown of a CPS vendor, a records forgery scheme by a principal, numerous instances of employees abusing CPS's tax-exempt status to purchase personal items at big-box retailers, illegally using taxpayer-funded resources to campaign for political causes and stealing from taxpayer-funded accounts intended for purchasing student materials.

A 2015 report released by the University of Illinois at Chicago's political science department declared Chicago the "corruption capital of America", citing that the Chicago-based Federal Judicial District for Northern Illinois reported 45 public corruption convictions for 2013 and a total of 1,642 convictions for the 38 years since 1976 when the U.S. Department of Justice began compiling the statistics. UIC Professor and former Chicago alderman Dick Simpson noted in the report that "To end corruption, society needs to do more than convict the guys that get caught. A comprehensive anti-corruption strategy must be forged and carried out over at least a decade. A new political culture in which public corruption is no longer tolerated must be created".

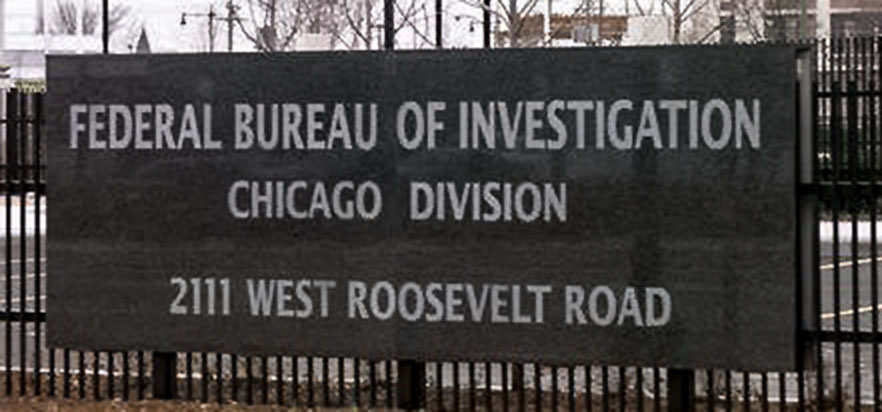
The FBI's Chicago division.

Examples of other high-profile Chicago political figures convicted on corruption related charges include Rod Blagojevich, Jesse Jackson Jr., Isaac Carothers, Arenda Troutman, Edward Vrdolyak, Otto Kerner, Jr., Constance Howard, Fred Roti and Dan Rostenkowski.

In October 2015, the FBI announced that Michael Anderson would take over for a retiring Robert Holley as Special Agent in Charge of the Chicago Bureau. Anderson, a corruption veteran who wrote the FBI Public Corruption Field Guide, called Chicago "target rich" for cases in an interview with the Chicago Tribune. Anderson commands a team of 850 agents in Chicago along with analysts and support staff.

Most corruption cases in Chicago are prosecuted by the US Attorney's office, as legal jurisdiction makes most offenses punishable as a federal crime. As of April 7, 2025, the US Attorney for the Northern district of Illinois was Andrew S. Boutros.

== Policing ==
During the Progressive Era, the first juvenile system was created by Chicago officials and, to make the court system more organized and specific, specialized courts, like those for domestic disputes, were created. Not only did the court and corrections systems change, there was also a change in policing. Divisions and squads became specialized on particular types of crime. The courts began to incorporate specialists, like scientists and psychologists, to make the trial and evidence more reliable and trustworthy.

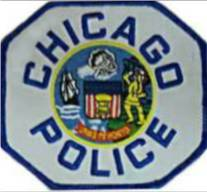
Chicago Police insignia

Chicago was among the first U.S. cities to create an integrated emergency-response center to coordinate the response to natural disasters, gang violence, and terrorist attacks. Built in 1995, the center is integrated with more than 2,000 cameras, communications with all levels of city government, and a direct link to the National Counterterrorism Center. Police credited surveillance cameras with contributing to decreased crime in 2004.

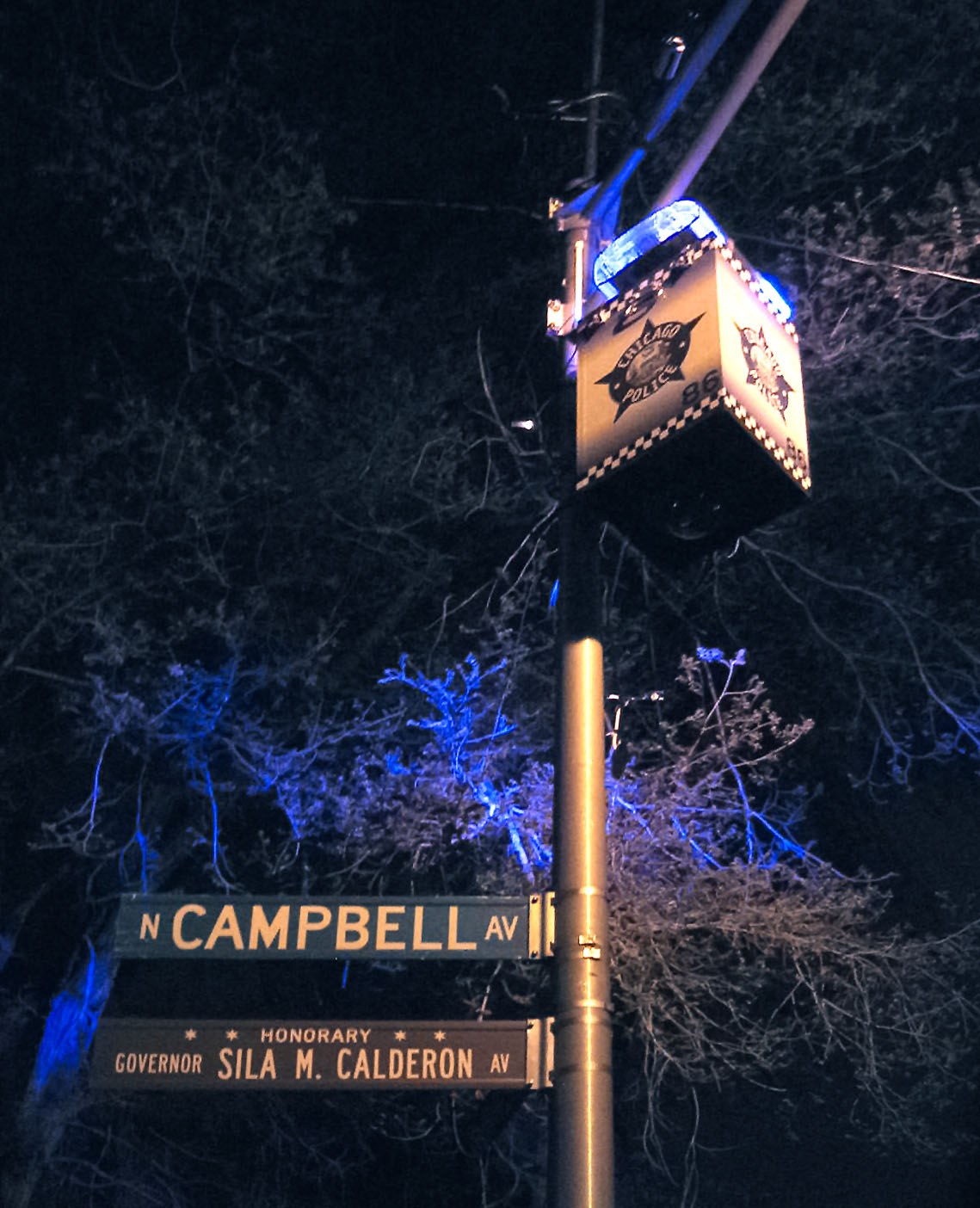
Chicago POD Camera in operation

In 2003, the Chicago Police Department began installing POD's (Police Observation Devices) in high-crime areas. The cameras are able to rotate 360 degrees and zoom to a fine level of detail. The devices are also bulletproof, operable in any weather condition, record continuously and switch into night-vision mode after dark. POD's are used to monitor street crime and direct police deployment. Data from the cameras is wirelessly transmitted to the Chicago Crime Prevention and Information Center (CPIC) which can individually control any camera. Over 20,000 cameras currently operate in Chicago. In addition to PODs, colloquially referred to as "blue-light cameras", the city has added general surveillance cameras to CTA stations, buses, Chicago Housing Authority buildings, public buildings and schools. This has prompted harsh criticism from privacy advocates and the ACLU who called the program "A pervasive and poorly regulated threat to our privacy".

The Chicago Police Department has also been criticized for its liberal use of the controversial "stop-and-frisk" policy. For decades, the policy gave officers much more autonomy to conduct stops and pat-downs if there exists a reasonable suspicion that a suspect might be armed and dangerous. The ACLU has claimed that the policy unfairly targets African Americans, who accounted for nearly 75% of those stopped in 2014, even though they account for a third of the city's population. The Chicago Police Department confiscated almost 7,000 firearms in 2014, about 583 per month. The stop-and-frisk policy was largely abandoned by CPD in early 2016.

Because the Chicago Police Department tallies data differently than police in other cities, the FBI often does not accept its crime statistics. Chicago police officers record all criminal sexual assaults, as opposed to only rape. They count aggravated battery together with the standard category of aggravated assault. As a result, Chicago is often omitted from studies such as Morgan Quitno's annual "Safest/Most Dangerous City" survey, which relies on FBI-collected data.

The Chicago Police Department's CLEAR (Citizen Law Enforcement Analysis and Reporting) system is a web application enabling the public to search the Chicago Police Department's database of reported crime. Individuals are able to see maps, graphs, and tables of reported crime. The database contains 90 days of information, which can be accessed in blocks of up to 14 days. Data is refreshed daily. However, the most recent information is always six days old.

The police use "guardian-like" intervention, a method relying on information from an individual's criminal history in order to predict the likelihood of becoming a victim or perpetrator of violence, to "build public trust and legitimacy."

CPD tallied 22 police-involved shootings in 2015, eight of which resulted in fatalities. Fatality cases involving an African American perpetrator often gave rise to a media sensation, both in Chicago and elsewhere. In December 2015, the US Department of Justice opened a civil rights investigation of the Chicago Police Department in the aftermath of the Laquan McDonald case. The "pattern and practice" probe evaluated the use of force, deadly force, accountability and tracking procedures of the department. A 190-page report issued in April 2016 deemed the Chicago Police Department a racist organization. Chairman of the Chicago Fraternal Order of Police, Dean Angelo called the report "totally biased" and "utterly ridiculous".

2016's surge in murders and shootings, coupled with a decline in gun seizures, led former Police Superintendent John Escalante to express concerns in March 2016 that officers might be hesitant to engage in proactive policing due to fear of retribution. Officers anonymously reported to the Chicago Sun-Times that they have been afraid to make investigatory stops because the Justice Department and American Civil Liberties Union of Illinois have been scrutinizing police practices. Data of the supposed pullback was reflected with an 80 percent decrease in the number of street stops that officers made since the beginning of 2016. Dean Angelo has claimed that part of the problem is politicians and groups like the ACLU who don't know much about policing, and yet are "dictating what police officers do".

Professors Paul Cassell and Richard Fowles at the University of Utah later analyzed the 2016 Chicago homicide "spike" and concluded that the most likely cause was a consent decree entered into by the American Civil Liberties Union (ACLU) with the Chicago Police Department restricting stop and frisks. Cassell and Fowles concluded that 239 additional victims were killed and 1129 additional shootings occurred in 2016 because of the reduction in stop and frisks. This study, however, failed to identify such spikes in the large number of other cities subject to similar consent decrees, leading to questions about whether they had really identified a causal relationship.

=== Crime reporting accuracy ===
In 2014 and 2015, Chicago Magazine and The Economist conducted investigations into the CompStat data reporting of crime statistics for the city and reported irregularities. In addition, an audit conducted by Chicago's Office of the Inspector General found significant problems in the accuracy of CPD's crime data.

According to Chicago Magazine, superiors often pressure officers to under-report crime. An unnamed police source quoted in the magazine says there are "a million tiny ways to do it", such as misclassifying and downgrading offenses, counting multiple incidents as single events, and discouraging residents from reporting crime. The police department has responded that their statistics are generally accurate and that the discrepancies can be explained by differences in the Uniform Crime Reporting used by the FBI and CompStat.

== Gun laws and dealers ==
The city of Chicago has one of the highest homicide rates among large cities. Despite generally strict gun laws compared to neighboring areas, there are still many illegal guns in Chicago. It is estimated that 80% of homicides in Chicago are committed with firearms.

Chicago passed a citywide handgun ban in 1982 that was in effect until a decision in McDonald v. City of Chicago by the Supreme Court of the United States in 2008. Chicago has a ban on guns designated as "assault weapons" and laser sights. Additionally, under Illinois law, to own a firearm one must possess a firearms owners’ identification (FOID) card, undergo a background check, and wait 72 hours before taking possession of a purchased firearm. Lost or stolen guns must also be reported to law enforcement within 72 hours. There are currently no gun stores within Chicago city limits and Federal firearms laws already make it illegal to buy firearms out of state without an FFL transfer and background check from that state. Access to guns is likely occurring via neighboring Indiana, a state with lax gun laws, and the many other areas through already illegal straw purchases.

About 7000 guns are recovered by Chicago police each year at crime scenes. An estimated 45% of these guns are bought by straw buyers in states with lax gun laws, namely Indiana. In April 2021, the City of Chicago filed a lawsuit against Westforth Sports of Gary, Indiana, alleging that it consistently ranks as one of the highest suppliers of guns used in crimes. The city claims that during the period from 2009 to 2016, 850 recovered guns were originally purchased from Westforth Sports.

== See also ==
- Gangs in Chicago
- Chuck's Gun Shop & Range
- Kids Off The Block
- Crime in Illinois
- Race and crime in the United States
