= Gang sign =

Various verbal/visual gestures used to reveal one's affiliation with a particular gang

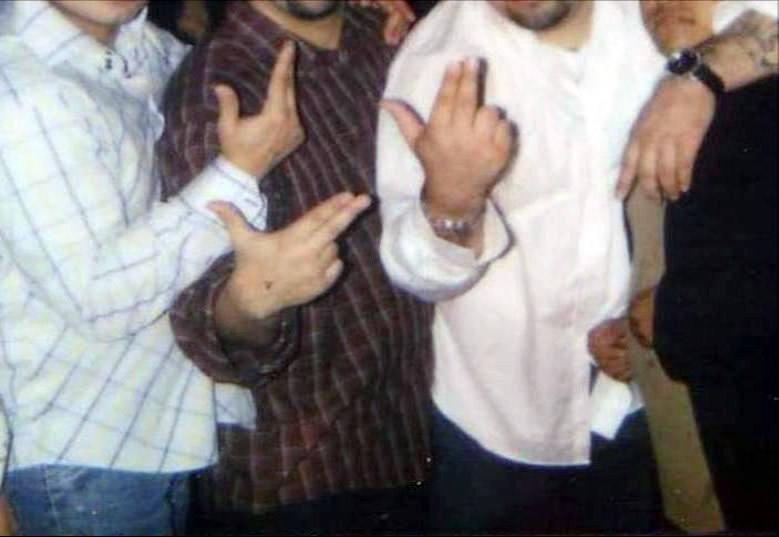
Hand signals of the Hermanos de Pistoleros Latinos

A gang sign, also known as a gang signal, is a verbal or visual way gang members identify their affiliation. This can take many forms including slogans, hand signs, colored clothing, and graffiti to indicate that the signaller favors, or is a member of, the associated gang. Many of these, especially slogans and hand signs, have become part of popular culture, especially in African American hip-hop culture.

== Hand signs ==
"Throwing up" a gang sign (e.g., "stacking", "page", "gang walk", "banging") with the hands is one of the most known and obvious forms of "claiming" or stating the gang one is affiliated with. It is used in many situations where other identifiers may not be possible or appropriate, and it can also show that a gang member is in the area to participate in illicit activities as opposed to just passing through. Usually, these signs are made by formation of the fingers on one or both hands to make some sort of symbol or letter. It can also serve to relay more specific information, such as what set they represent within a larger gang or in which activities they are currently taking part. Individual letters can be used to tell stories when flashed in rapid succession, each representing a word beginning with that letter. These signs, because they are displayed only when wanted (as opposed to the types of identifiers above), are usually the most consistent across various areas. Many of these hand signals are quite close to other common hand signs, and this can cause confusion among gang members, non-gang members, and anti-gang authorities. Most African American and Mexican gangs use these symbols.

Another identifier that can be displayed only when desired is a gang handshake, which usually includes some component of the gang hand signs and/or other hand and finger symbols.

== Clothing and other forms of identification ==
Clothing is a strong signal that all gangs show. The clothing gangs wear allows rival gangs to identify who is friend and who is foe. For example, the uniforms for many Hispanic gangs are standard and easily recognizable. Gangs such as the Latin Kings would wear long yellow T-shirts, baggy pants, and either a bandana or a hat, sometimes both. Black gang members are generally more individualistic with their clothing. The gang would wear specific clothing and certain accessories that would match their crew's colors. Most gang members wear brands such as Pro Club, Dickies, and Levi's.

=== Mask ===
Masks can be worn in various types of colors and ways. This is done by gang members to signify which gang they are affiliated with. The most popular mask colors are red, blue, black, white, grey, pink, and yellow. It is typically worn on the left or right back pockets of gang members. They can also be worn as a camp mask by wrapping around the head so only the eyes show.

=== Tattoos ===
Gang members will often get tattoos to represent their gang, or subset of a gang which can include markings related to the street their set is from, or a nickname of the neighborhood given by a gang. For example, members of the Maniac Latin Disciples set known as "Rata World" may get a tattoo of the street their set originates from. Gang members may also get certain tattoos to disrespect rivals gangs.

=== Varsity clothing ===
Around the 1970s to 1990s, it was common for some of Chicago's strongest street gangs to create custom varsity sweaters to represent their gang. This trend however eventually died out due to gang members in the Chicago area being robbed, beaten, or even killed by rival gangs due to the increased status of having a rival's varsity jacket, the implication being that the victim was too weak or cowardly to keep it.

=== Business cards ===
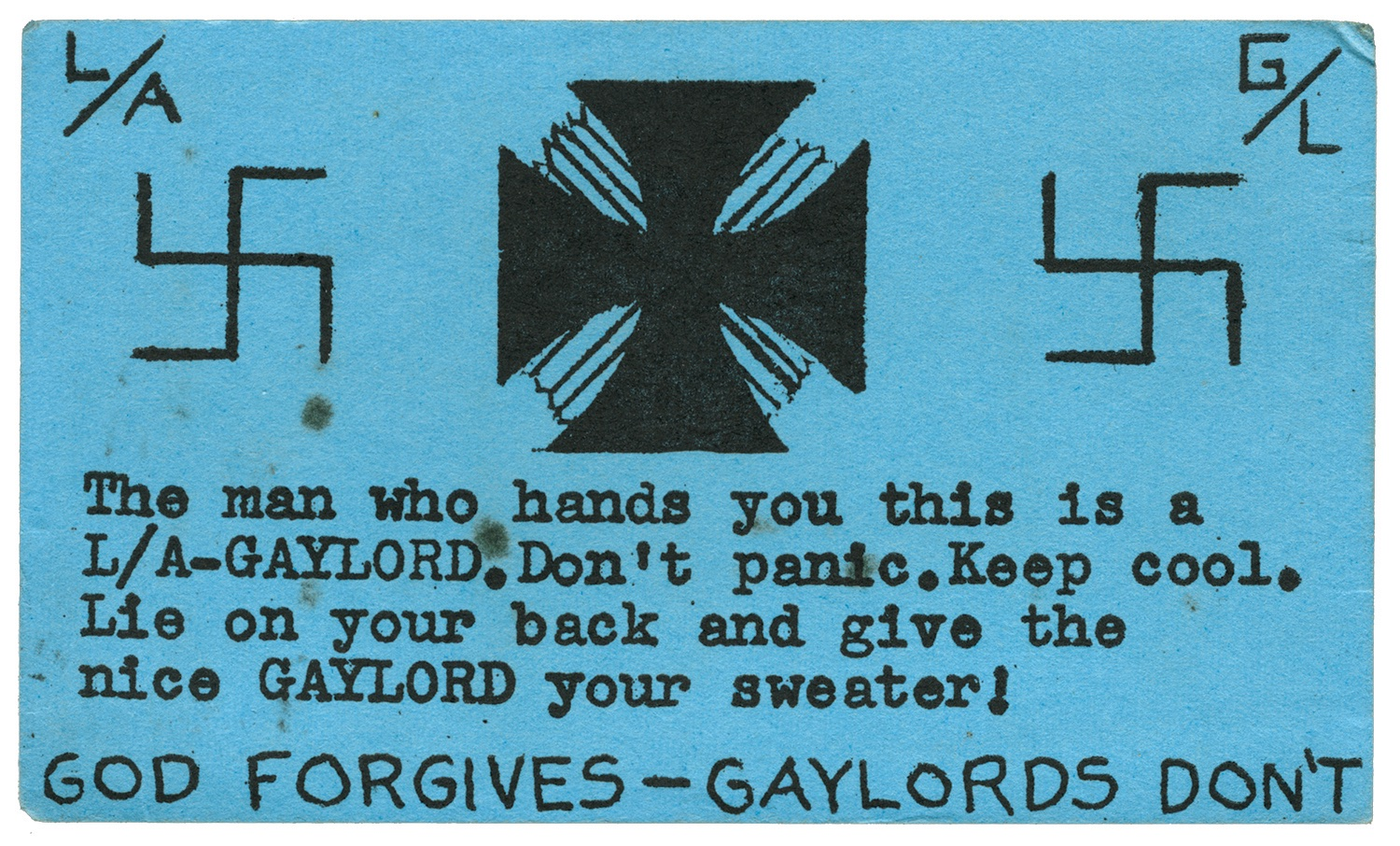
Business card belonging to the Almighty Gaylords

Another common gang identifier in 1960s to 1990s Chicago were business cards. Street gangs often used these cards in order to represent their subset, or in the case of gangs like the Almighty Gaylords, were used to intimidate rivals with text telling rival gang members to hand over their gang sweaters.

=== Vests ===
Outlaw motorcycle clubs, and even some street gangs from New York City and New Zealand have been known to wear vests with patches representing their gangs. These vests can come in a variety of materials such as denim or leather.

=== Tracksuits ===
Tracksuits are common among street gangs and criminals in Russia since the 1980s. They later become a staple feature of a criminal-derived subculture known as gopniks in Russia and dresiarze in Poland.
