= Jousters =

Former Chicago street gang

Almighty Taylor Street Jousters
- Founded: 1960
- Founding location: Little Italy, Chicago, Illinois
- Years active: 1960–2005
- Territory: Chicago
- Ethnicity: European-American
- Allies: Chicago Outfit, Gaylords and several other European-American gangs
- Rivals: Gangster Disciples, Latin Kings, Simon City Royals

The Taylor Street Jouster Nation was a Chicago street gang that originally started on the Near West Side and then later branched out to the north side of the city as well. Their name is a reference to the medieval sport of jousting.

== Origins ==
Some sources have the Jousters forming in the 1960s, but evidence has come to light recently, that seems to point to the fact that the Taylor Street Jousters started in the 1950s, around the area of Taylor and Oakley in Little Italy, Chicago, Illinois. One piece of that evidence is a photograph of members called Little Bill and Big Bill at the Sabers club on Western Avenue in 1959, and another piece of evidence is of old youth workers from the 1950s, mentioning the Jousters by name, when talking about the racial issues between Italian, Mexican, Puerto Rican and Black youths, within the Near West Side community in the late 1950s, and what they said, gave the impression that the Jousters had been around for a number of years prior to that point. They are believed to have been founded by Pete Bianco; other original members were Loco, Juan, Rocky, Mouse, Tito, Little Joe, Nick and Victor. The ethnic makeup of the Taylor Jousters was primarily Italian and Mexican.

The Jouster's main symbols of representation were a medieval knight's helmet, two crossed lances and a simple cross with four slashes above, that was used in their graffiti, murals, gang business cards and on gang sweaters. Their original colors were a light blue and white and then in 1967, they changed their colors to Navy blue and baby blue sported together.

The main rivals of the Taylor Street Jousters were Satan Disciples and Harrison Gents. In 1969 or 1970 they met some individuals at Prosser High School and officially sanctioned majority white branches to be formed on Fullerton and St. Louis and North Ave and Damen, on the north side of Chicago. The main rivals of the North Side Jousters were the Puerto Rican immigrants that had been moving into various predominantly white north side neighborhoods since the early 1950s, including what was now Jousters territory. Starting in the early to mid-70s the North Side Jousters became tightly allied with the Chicago Gaylords and followed them into becoming members of the WPO (White power organisation), which was a ceasefire among the white gangs on the north side of Chicago, so that they could focus on fighting the black and Puerto Rican gangs. They were also part of the "Stone Greasers" association, which basically meant that they prided themselves on being a gang that originated from the greaser gangs of the 1950s and 1960s. In about 1973 an official alliance called UFO (United Five Organisation) was formed among several north side white gangs, including Gaylords, Jousters, Playboys, C-Notes and Ventures. It must also be mentioned that the Jousters from Taylor and Oakley, which were predominantly Mexican by this time, did not like the white power stance that the north side Jousters had taken and most members from the Taylor Street area did not consider these north side Jousters, to be Taylor Jousters and to this day, call them out on social media.

By the early 1980s, the Jousters had firmly established additional sets on the street corners of Honor and Bloomingdale, Sawyer and Altgeld, Hanson Park and other spots. All these sets or branches used a "T-J" in their graffiti, and murals as a reference to the fact that were honored to have originated from the Taylor Street Jousters, even if the feeling was not mutual. One of their slogans that could be heard around this time period was, "Blue on blue, will always be proud and true" and also "20 10 to the chest fuck the rest".

At this time, the Hanson Park Jousters were allied with a neighboring White gang known as Cragin Park Playboys, through an alliance called PVJs. PVJ stood for Playboys, Ventures, and Jousters. Even though the Ventures had disbanded, the Playboys and Jousters were still paying honorable homage to them by keeping them on the original title. The Jousters also continued their strong unity with the Gaylords, calling this unification GFJ. This stood for Gaylords, Jousters and Freaks. The Freaks were another predominantly white street gang.

By the mid-1980s most of the Jousters sections had closed down, including Taylor and Oakley, North and Damen and Fullerton and St Louis. Their last main sections at this time was Hanson Park and 46th/Talman, which both sections lasted around 1996. The Latin Pachucos now control Hanson Park while the Satan Disciples now control the latter.
