= OutLaw Gangster Disciples =

- Founded by: David Barksdale; Larry Hoover, Charles "Big Chuck" Dorsey
- Founding location: Cabrini–Green Homes, Chicago, Illinois, United States
- Years active: Early 1990s–present
- Territory: Chicago
- Ethnicity: African American
- Membership (est.): 25,000–50,000 (2009)
- Criminal activities: Drug trafficking, robbery, extortion, murder
- Allies: Folk Nation, Crips, Zoe Pound Gang, Black Guerilla Family, and Black Mafia Family
- Rivals: People Nation, Ku Klux Klan, WPU (White Power United), and Black Disciples

The OutLaw Gangster Disciple Nation is a subset of the Gangster Disciples street gang. It was formed in the Chicago Housing Authority's Cabrini-Green public housing project on the Near North Side of Chicago, Illinois in the early 1990s, by Gangster Disciple board member and Cabrini resident Charles "Big Chuck" Dorsey. It has since branched out to the South Side of the city.

== Gangster Disciples in the military ==
Gangster Disciples have been documented in the U.S. military, found in both U.S. and overseas bases. Graffiti characteristic of the Gangster Disciples has reportedly been spotted in U.S. military bases in Iraq and Afghanistan.

== Symbols, signs, and emblems ==
Like most major gangs, the Gangster Disciples use a well-defined system of symbols to communicate alliances and rivalries. This system is a combination of symbols representing the Gangster Disciple Nation or the Folk Nation as a whole, and symbols that rivals use to represent their organization, typically inverted to show disrespect.
