= Popes (gang) =

Chicago, Illinois street gang

North Side Insane Popes
- Founding location: Chicago, Illinois, U.S.
- Years active: 1950s-present
- Territory: North/South sides of Chicago
- Ethnicity: Mostly European Americans
- Membership: Unknown
- Allies: Folk Nation, TAP Boyz, Imperial Gangsters, Simon City Royals
- Rivals: People Nation, Insane Deuces, Familia Stones, Almighty Gaylords, Latin Kings, Black P. Stones, Assyrian Kings

The Almighty Insane Popes Nation is a European American Chicago, Illinois street gang, formed in the late 1950s on the north side of Chicago, primarily building membership from a Greek greaser gang that hung out at the corner of Lawrence and Rockwell. This small group had problems with the much larger Latin Kings gang on the north side, and so they began to associate with the Almighty Simon City Royals in an attempt to protect themselves. However, rather than joining the Royals outright, they eventually decided to form their own gang, which they named the Popes: this stood for "Protecting Our People Eliminating Spics" (eventually the racial slur would be replaced by "scum" when the Popes ceased to be an exclusively European American gang and began inviting Hispanic or Latino Americans and Black people to join).

== Expansion ==
By the mid 1970s the Popes' main membership consisted of many Poles from the Albany Park/Lincoln Square neighborhood, and German, Irish, and Scandinavians in the Portage Park, Jefferson Park, and Mayfair neighborhoods. At their peak in the mid-1960s to early 1970s, they had 300–500 members. In the 1980s, news reports indicated that some members were the children of Chicago Fire Department firefighters and Chicago Police Department officers.

=== South Side Almighty Insane Popes ===
Insane South Side Popes
- Founding location: Chicago, Illinois, U.S.
- Years active: 1970s-present
- Territory: McKinley Park, Chicago Clearing, Chicago
- Ethnicity: Mostly Caucasian Americans
- Membership: Unknown
- Allies: People Nation, 12th Street Players, Insane City Knights, Latin Kings, Black P. Stones, Party Players, Almighty Gaylords
- Rivals: Folk Nation, Gangster Two Six, Latin Counts, TAP Boyz, Insane Spanish Cobras, Satan Disciples, Ambrose, Insane 22, Latin Angels

In the mid 1970s, some accounts claim the nation leader, Larry "Larkin" Morris, started a new branch on the south side. In 1975, Larkin was killed by members of the Almighty Gaylords. The north side Insane Popes formed even stronger alliance with the Simon City Royals, and called this “DAB”. The Royals joined the Folks Nation, and the Almighty Insane Popes Nation eventually did also. However, the south side branch, who hated the Satan Disciples and Two-Six gangs who were Folks Nation members, became a renegade faction, even going so far as to join the rival People Nation alliance and severing ties completely with the north side Almighty Insane Popes Nation.

== Modern day ==
Today the North Side Popes' main rivals are the Latin Kings, and the South Side Popes' main rivals are the Spanish Cobras, Satan Disciples, and Gangster Two-Six. As of 2022, the South Side Popes have active territory in McKinley Park, Hale Park, Vittum Park, and Mt. Greenwood.

The North Side Popes remain allied with the Folk Nation, while the south side Popes remain allied with the People Nation. South Side Popes wear Chicago White Sox apparel or black and white and Pittsburgh Pirates hats. North Side Popes wear baby-blue and black, showing allegiance to the Royals with whom they retain close ties.

== See also ==
- Simon City Royals
- Almighty Gaylords
- Folk Nation
- People Nation
