= Lester Street Massacre =

2008 mass murder in Tennessee, U.S.

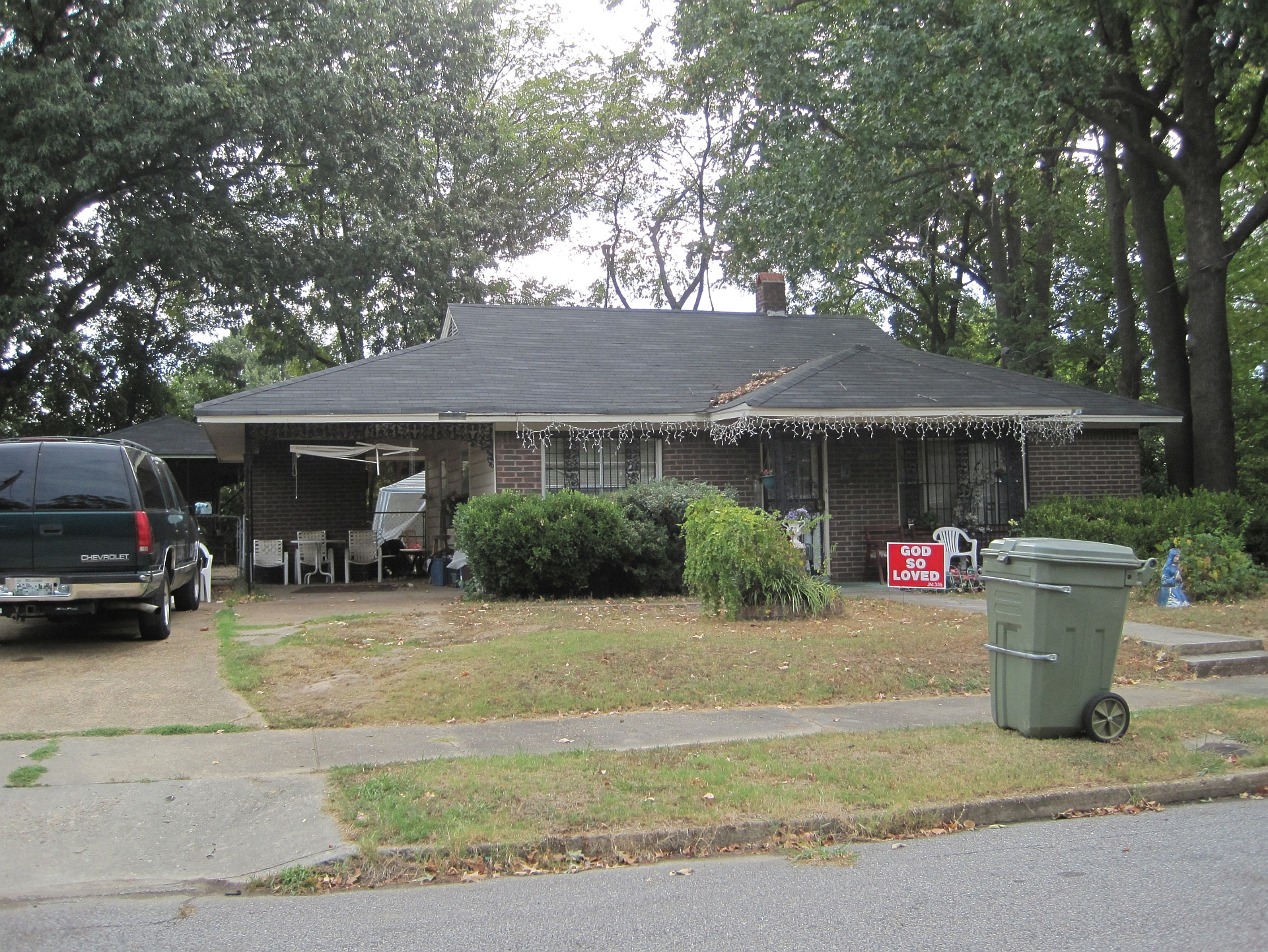
- The outside of 722 Lester Street where the massacre occurred in Binghampton, Memphis, Tennessee
- Location: 35.152229°N 89.964877°W; Binghampton, Memphis, Tennessee, U.S.
- Date: March 2, 2008; 18 years ago c. 2:00 a.m.
- Weapons: 9mm Semi-automatic handgun; .380 SIG Sauer P232 handgun; Kitchen knife; Wooden board
- Deaths: 6 (4 by gunfire)
- Injuries: 3
- Perpetrator: Jessie Dotson

The Lester Street Massacre (Note: Sources refer to the incident by various names, including the Lester Street Massacre, the Lester Street murders, the Lester Street killings, and the Lester Street attacks.) was a mass murder which took place on March 2, 2008, in the Binghampton neighborhood of Memphis, Tennessee. Four adults were fatally shot and two children were stabbed to death, while three others, all children, were injured. The perpetrator, 33-year-old Jessie Dotson, who was related to some of the victims, was arrested a few days later.

Dotson was convicted of all six murders and sentenced to death for each, receiving a total of six death sentences, currently the most among inmates on Tennessee's death row. He remains on death row and is imprisoned at the Riverbend Maximum Security Institution in Nashville, Tennessee. He continues to maintain his innocence.

The case was featured on the A&E true-crime program The First 48, which included portions of Dotson's taped confession, in which he admitted responsibility for the murders. The massacre remains one of the deadliest mass killings and mass shootings in Tennesse's history.

== Background ==
=== Perpetrator ===
Jessie Dotson Jr.

Jessie Lee Dotson Jr. was born on December 19, 1974. He was described as having a troubled upbringing and reportedly grew up in a home marked by chaos and abuse. He also had a reportedly "hostile" relationship with his family. Dotson's mother would frequently leave the home and her children, once going on a church trip to North Carolina and returning with a boyfriend. Dotson was bullied as a child because of his clothing and had to repeat the fourth grade due to chronic absenteeism. He and his siblings lacked proper clothes and were mocked at school as a result. He often missed school for this reason. Dotson's father regularly beat his mother, prompting her to take the children and leave him. The children never learned where their father went. One day, Dotson's father returned home to find his children gone and had no idea where they were. It was not until four or five months later that Dotson's mother finally contacted him. At one point, Dotson's grandmother threw him out of her house after he stole money to buy food.

In 1990, Dotson was charged with disorderly conduct for making threats against his mother. He was also charged with assault after a 13-year-old reported that Dotson punched him in the face and threatened to hospitalize him if he did not bring him money the next day. In 1991, police arrested Dotson for disorderly conduct after his mother reported that he came home wanting to fight his brother. He broke down a door and punched several large holes in the walls. He then pointed his finger in his mother's face and told her he was going to kill her. Officers arrived and had to calm him down. By eighth grade, at age 16, Dotson dropped out of school entirely and entered the juvenile court system. On December 13, 1991, six days before his 17th birthday, police pulled over a car in which Dotson was a passenger. He was found in possession of a .20-gauge sawed-off shotgun and a .38-caliber pistol and was subsequently arrested. In 1992, Dotson was again charged with disorderly conduct after an incident in which he cursed at a neighbor during an argument and threw two beer bottles at her apartment.

=== 1994 murder ===
On January 8, 1994, 19-year-old Jessie Dotson shot and killed 43-year-old Halle Ralph Cox in front of 596 S. Lauderdale in Memphis, Tennessee. The murder was one of nine committed in Memphis during the first nine days of 1994. Residents of the Foote Homes public housing development heard gunshots around 11:00 p.m. and went to investigate. They found the body of Cox, who was dressed in painter's clothes. He had been shot once in the head. The murder remained unsolved for months, prompting police to offer a $1,000 reward for information leading to an arrest.

On May 5, 1994, police arrested Jessie Dotson in connection with the case. Five days later, Memphis homicide detectives charged him with Cox's murder. The reason Dotson killed Cox was because of a dispute over a drug deal. Cox had purchased what he thought was crack from Dotson but later discovered it was soap shavings. An enraged Cox got into a dispute with Dotson, which resulted in Dotson shooting and killing Cox.

Dotson was charged with first-degree murder. He pleaded guilty to second-degree murder, and as part of a plea deal, agreed to 18 years in prison. He was first eligible for parole after nearly five and a half years. However, Dotson did not receive parole for 13 years. As part of his parole conditions, he was required to serve the remainder of his prison sentence if he was ever caught with a weapon or drugs, or if he was involved in any other criminal activity. He was also required to check in with his parole officer on a regular basis. Ultimately, Dotson served 14 years in prison for second-degree murder and was released just months before the Lester Street Massacre. (Note: Dotson's release date from prison for the 1994 murder is disputed. Some sources state January 2008, while others state "seven months" before the Lester Street Massacre, which would be August 2007.)

== Shootings and melee attacks ==
In the early morning hours of Sunday, March 2, 2008, 33-year-old Jessie Dotson got into a heated argument with his younger brother, 30-year-old Cecil Dotson, at the latter's home at 722 Lester Street in Binghampton, Memphis. Despite conflicting with him repeatedly during his youth, Jessie had rekindled his relationship with Cecil following his release from prison. Cecil worked as a maintenance man at an apartment building and rented the 722 Lester Street house just north of Summer Avenue in Binghampton. The brothers had spent the previous day drinking and arguing throughout the afternoon. During the argument, which turned into a fight, Jessie pulled out a semi-automatic handgun and shot his brother multiple times, resulting in Cecil's death. He then decided to eliminate every witness in the house. First, he shot and killed 27-year-old Marissa Rene Williams, Cecil's girlfriend and the mother of four of his children. He then shot and killed two of Cecil's friends who were at the home at the time, 33-year-old Hollis Seals and 22-year-old Shindri Roberson. He used two pistols, one a 9mm, which he discharged 13 times, the other a .380, which he discharged 8 times, and neither of the pistols were ever found.

Following the murders of the four adults, Jessie then proceeded to eliminate the children in the home, as he did not want a single living witness to the crime. He stabbed and bludgeoned to death two of his nephews, 4-year-old Cemario Dotson and 2-year-old Cecil Dotson II. He also attempted to murder three other children in the home, who ultimately managed to survive. He attacked two of his nephews, 9-year-old Cecil "C.J." Dotson Jr. and 5-year-old Cedric Dotson, as well as his niece, 3-month-old Ceniyah Dotson. All three were stabbed multiple times. Jessie killed all the adult victims with a semi-automatic handgun while the children were attacked with a kitchen knife and a wooden board. The cause of death for Cemario was blunt trauma to the head and a stab wound to the chest, while Cecil Dotson II died from stab wounds to the head.

=== Aftermath ===
Following the massacre, Jessie attempted to conceal the crime by altering the scene to make it appear as though the murders were gang or drug-related. He moved several bodies around, disposed of kitchen knives, and collected cartridge casings. He fled the crime scene on C.J.'s bicycle and hid it at his girlfriend's house. He went out for dinner at a restaurant on the evening of March 2, and reported for work the following morning.

On the evening of March 3, 40 hours after the massacre occurred, Officer Randall Davis of the Memphis Police Department responded to a call to check on the welfare of Cecil Dotson and his family at his Lester Street address. Relatives of Cecil had called the police after they had been unable to contact him by phone or by visiting the house. When Davis approached the house, he discovered the door was open. Both he and another officer then entered the house and found the body of an adult male lying beside a television. They then found three more adult bodies beside a couch. Davis and two other officers then began searching the house while a fourth stood by the door. Davis entered a bathroom and pulled back the shower curtain. He found C.J. lying in the bathtub with a 4½-inch knife blade stuck in his skull. At first, Davis thought C.J. was dead, but then he saw his eyes twitch and realized he was alive. The officers continued to search the house and found the bodies of Cemario and Cecil Dotson II in a bedroom. Cedric and Ceniyah were found alive in different bedrooms.

== Victims ==
=== Killed ===
- Cecil Dotson, 30, shot in the head, neck, chest, and legs
- Marissa Williams, 27, shot in the head, chest, abdomen, and legs
- Hollis Seals, 33, shot in the mouth and chest
- Shindri Roberson, 22, shot in the legs
- Cemario Dotson, 4, blunt trauma to the head and stab wound to the chest
- Cecil Dotson II, 2, stab wounds to the head

=== Injured ===
- Cecil "C.J." Dotson Jr., 9, stabbed
- Cedric Dotson, 5, stabbed
- Ceniyah Dotson, 3-months, stabbed

== Investigation of the massacre ==
The three surviving children were taken to a children's hospital in Memphis and were held under police protection. At the time, police refused to give their identities or discuss their conditions. Cecil Dotson was identified in jail records as a known gang member, and both he and Seals had criminal records that included possession of illegal drugs and firearms. Because Cecil was a gang member, investigators at first thought the murders may have been a "gang-related retaliation". However, one of the surviving children eventually was able to talk with investigators and implicated their uncle, Jessie Dotson, as the person responsible for the massacre. On March 7, 2008, Jessie Dotson was arrested and charged with six counts of first-degree murder and three counts of attempted first-degree murder. Jessie was interviewed and reportedly gave an oral statement of admission to the massacre.

== Trial and appeals ==
In September 2010, Jessie Dotson was tried for the murders. His trial was held in Memphis; however, jurors were selected in Nashville due to intense local coverage of the case. Prosecutors announced they would be seeking the death penalty. Despite confessing to the crime to both the police and his mother in the days after the massacre, at trial, Jessie changed his plea to not guilty. Jessie's defense attorney argued there was not enough evidence to convict him and that Cecil Dotson had gang ties that could have played a role in the killings. There was no DNA linking Jessie to the crime. Police also found several unidentified fingerprints and hair from an unknown Asian person, while Jessie and all the victims were African-American. Cecil also had ties to the Gangster Disciples, an African-American street gang. Jessie's attorney argued that the killings could therefore have been gang-related, as not long before the massacre, Cecil had a falling out with a gang member and had called the police to a gang member's house. One of the survivors of the massacre, Cecil "C.J." Dotson Jr., first told police while he was recovering in hospital that a man named Roger or Roderick had attacked his family. However, he later told police officers that it was his "Uncle Junior", the family's name for Jessie Dotson, who was behind the attack.

Jessie's trial lasted for two weeks. Jessie blamed the attack on gang members, claiming he was in the house on Lester Street when the crime occurred but had hidden under a bed during the massacre. He told jurors he did not report the crime to police because he feared for his life. However, both Cecil "C.J." Dotson Jr. and Cedric Dotson, two of the surviving victims of the massacre, testified at the trial and pointed to their "Uncle Junior" as the man who had carried out the massacre, killed their father, and left them for dead. Jessie's mother was also a key prosecution witness. Jessie's older sister, Nicole, also testified at the trial and claimed that Jessie held a grudge against his family because he felt they could have done a better job of visiting him while he was in jail. The prosecutor, Ray Lepone, praised C.J. in particular for taking the stand, saying, "CJ solved it. He had the courage to come in here and point out his uncle." Lepone also asked the jury to find courage in C.J. and Cedric, who were brave enough to testify with the killer in the same room as them.

On October 11, 2010, the jury found Jessie Dotson guilty. He was convicted of three counts of attempted first-degree murder in addition to six counts of first-degree murder. The following day, the same jury sentenced him to six death sentences, one for each life he took. Jurors took less than two hours to sentence Jessie to die by lethal injection. Criminal Court Judge James Beasley then imposed the death sentences. Jessie showed little emotion as the sentences were imposed and only nodded as officers escorted him from the courtroom. In November 2010, Jessie was also sentenced to an extra 120 years in prison for the attempted murders. Jessie was first scheduled to be put to death on March 2, 2012, four years to the day after the murders. However, it was noted at the time that appeals would delay it.

On June 25, 2013, an appeals court upheld Jessie's conviction. As of 2025, Jessie Dotson remains on Tennessee's death row. He continues to maintain his innocence. In 2024, he petitioned the court to get off death row with the claim that he received unconstitutional capital convictions and sentences. With six death sentences, Jessie Dotson currently holds the highest number among inmates on Tennessee's death row. The all-time record is seven, imposed on former inmate Paul Dennis Reid, who died in 2013.

== In popular culture ==
The Lester Street Massacre was featured on the A&E true-crime program The First 48. The Memphis Police Department granted producers access to the crime scenes, interrogations, detectives' insights, and other details related to the case. The show also aired portions of Dotson's taped confession, in which he admitted responsibility for the murders. A judge later ruled that prosecutors could not present parts of the confession to the jury, as it had already been broadcast on national television. Typically, such evidence is first introduced in a courtroom. The judge disallowed the confession seen on the program because other information may have been recorded but not aired that was relevant to Jessie's case. The judge was uncomfortable that many hours of Jessie's interrogation, which may have been favorable to his defense, was no longer available. The judge said, "I'm very much concerned with this videotape. It's not in the control of the police or prosecutors. It's in the control of Hollywood."

== See also ==
- List of death row inmates in the United States § Tennessee
