= Simon City Royals =

Chicago street gang

- Founded: 1952 (Simon City); 1969 (Simon City Royals)
- Founding location: Chicago, Illinois, U.S.
- Years active: 1952–present
- Ethnicity: Predominantly White American
- Leader: Wisconsin Olie Olsen
- Activities: Drug trafficking, human trafficking, robbery, burglary, murder
- Allies: Folk Nation; Gangster Disciples
- Rivals: Latin Kings; People Nation; Spanish Cobras; Vice Lords; Chicago Gaylords

The Simon City Royals, also known as the Almighty Simon City Royal Nation or simply the Royals, are a street and prison gang which began in Chicago during 1952 as Simon City, a greaser gang. They named themselves for Simons Park, which is located on the corner of Drake and Wabansia in the Humboldt Park neighborhood where they originally formed. The gang had a major influence on other gangs around Chicago and were instrumental in the History of gangs in Humboldt Park. The Royals are one of the oldest and largest white gangs in the US.

The Royals are heavily involved in the dealing of illegal drugs and other contraband, particularly in prisons where members are incarcerated. They have successfully bribed a prison guard in Milwaukee to smuggle drugs into an institution and are involved in racketeering and loan sharking. The gang has expanded to other states, and is one of the fastest-growing gangs in Mississippi.

== Early years ==
In the 1960s, Simon City became involved in turf wars with other gangs including the Imperial Gangsters, Latin Kings, Jokers, Drakers, and Belairs. By this time, the gang had begun to expand and organize and had spread to other neighborhoods on the northwest side. In 1969 Simon City member Rashad "Arab" Zayed, had just returned from the Vietnam War and went to live with his family in the Lakeview neighborhood, where his family had moved while he was away. He wanted to start a new section of the gang in his new location, so he befriended a gang called the Ashland Royals, friends of his younger brother. He requested to join them and was accepted.

Now that both gangs had officially become one, Arab, without the knowledge of anybody else, had Coco go and get a card made that had the name of their new gang on it and the names of the original members. When members of the Ashland Royals saw this card, they were not happy because the card said Simon City North and Arab had not incorporated their name into the new gang, so they told Arab that if they were to join him their name must also be incorporated into the new gang. An agreement was made and the new gang would now be called Simon City Royals. Now that they had given themselves a new name, the SCRz had officially separated themselves from Simon City, which continued to operate as a separate gang until the mid 1970s, when they closed all operations. The original corners that the Simon City Royals claimed were Irving Park Road and Ashland Avenue in the Lakeview neighborhood. Contrary to popular belief the SCRz were originally a racially mixed gang, with Mexican, Puerto Rican, Cuban, White and Arabic members and then grew to become a majority white gang, with the exception of Farwell and Clark in the Rogers Park neighborhood, which had members that were Black, White and Latino.

== Turf wars and alliances ==
In the 1970s, the gang had tenuous alliances to the city's two major white gangs, the Popes and the Gaylords. In 1975, the Gaylords killed Larry "Larkin" Morris, then the leader of the Popes, and the Popes decided to form an alliance with the Royals. The Royals also fought major "wars" with the Latin Kings, Insane Deuces and Latin Eagles in which many lives were lost, including some of the top ranking Simon City Royals. Three of the most known and respected Royals, who lost their lives because of these wars in the 1970s, were Arab and Tuffy, who were both killed in 1974 and Tuffy's older brother Bimbo, who was killed in 1975.

By this time the Royals had spread out to include neighborhoods like Albany and School, Drake and Wolfram, Southport and Fullerton, Central Park and Wilson, California and Fletcher, Farwell and Clark, Marshfield and Grace, among others. The Southport and Fullerton Royals were involved in a "war" with the Insane Unknowns because their leader Flash had killed Capone of the Unknowns after inviting him to a peace meeting. The ensuing war between the Unknowns and the Southport and Fullerton Royals would result in many deaths in both gangs, including the murder of Bulldog, who was a well known member of the Southport and Fullerton Royals. The changing demographics of the neighborhood eventually drove out most of the Southport and Fullerton Royals by the 1990s.

In 1978 behind prison walls, Larry Hoover, who was the leader of the Gangster Disciples wanted to create an alliance between the Black, Latino and White gangs, so he approached numerous gangs, including the Simon City Royals and together they created the Folk Nation. The leader of the Central Park and Wilson Simon City Royals, Todd O'Thomas, his alias was Todd Brewer, was killed by the Puerto Rican Stones in the early 80s.

== Decline ==
The Royals entered into vicious street wars with the Latin Kings, Insane Deuces and Gaylords. In 1984, the Royals shot a 14-year-old Gaylord in the back, killing him. One of the Gaylords present was Michael Scott, who would later go on to write a book about his days as a Gaylord titled Lords of Lawndale. Hours after the murder, Scott identified a Royal named Mike Hynes as one of the shooters and testified against him.

Hynes and Orlando Serrano, who claimed to not be a gang member, were tried for murder. Serrano was found not guilty, but Hynes was convicted in part because of testimony given by fellow Simon City Royal members, as well as testimony given by Scott and two others who were present when the killing occurred. Hynes spent over twenty years in prison and was killed shortly after his release after being involved in the stabbing of a woman in a Chicago bar.

== Later history ==
The Royals killed several members of the Deuces and the Kings and the PR Stones in the 1980s, in addition to the 14-year-old that they shot in the back. By the early 90s, however, they had begun to feud with their former allies, the Spanish Cobras and Latin Disciples. The Royals killed several Cobras and had some of their members killed in return.

Out of necessity, they entered into a grouping within the Folks alliance known as the Almighty Family. This faction consists of the Royals, Imperial Gangsters, Harrison Gents, Latin Eagles and Ambrose.

The Royals still control some of their historic strongholds on the north side of Chicago and have spread into the suburbs and other states such as Wisconsin and Mississippi. They tried to gain a claim in Springfield Illinois in the early 2000s when Sir Jokey the Springfield Chapter Sir brutally murdered his step Father Ron Propst. There was a heavy recruiting effort put into place and their numbers began to rise. However it was short lived as a small group of kids band together and sought revenge for the murder of their uncle Ron. Named by the Illinois Gang task Force the “Springfield Mafia” a group of seven teens and young adults began pushing back against the newly recruited members. Several gun fights erupted across the city and multiple members of the Springfield Chapter were sent to the ICU and treated for gun shot wounds most notably Jarrod Day and Jesse Jeffers were shot and hospitalized for multiple gunshot wounds and the shooters were later released and all charges dropped for lack of evidence. Today they still consist mostly of white members but also includes many Latin American and African American members as well.

In March 2022 21 alleged members of the gang were charged under the RICO law in the U.S. The number of gang members convicted reached 37 by the conclusion of the case in 2024 with help from agencies such as The United States Secret Service.

== Criminal activities in the Southern United States ==
The Simon City Royals have expanded their influence across the Southern United States. Especially the states of Mississippi and Alabama. They are reportedly one of four of the most prominent gangs in Mississippi. The other three are the Gangster Disciples, Vice Lords and Aryan Brotherhood of Mississippi.

=== Disappearance of Skyler Burnley ===
On June 3, 2016, a 27-year-old man named Joseph "Skyler" Burnley disappeared in Brandon, Mississippi. Skyler's disappearance has been tied by police to the Simon City Royals as he was a former member and wanted to leave the gang. Police believe his friend Travis Brewer and his girlfriend Amanda Morris might have lured him into the woods and killed him in exchange for drugs or money from the gang. Although police don't have enough evidence to conclusively tie anyone to the disappearance of Burnley.

=== Criminal Activity in Mississippi ===
Besides the disappearance of Skyler Burnley the Simon City Royals have been involved in numerous other high-profile acts of criminality. In February 2017 they kidnapped two sailors on leave and forced them to draw cash from an ATM and then left them on a side of the road. Those involved would later be sentenced to 40 years in prison.

=== Criminal Activity in Alabama ===
The Simon City Royals aren't as prominent in Alabama as they are in Mississippi but that hasn't stopped them from expanding into that state. They especially have influence in Marshall County and Mobile County especially in the areas of Wilmer and Semmes.

== See also ==
- Gangs in the United States
  - Gangs in Chicago
