= Chicago Gaylords =

European-American Street gang based in Chicago, Illinois, United States

Almighty Gaylords
- Founded: 1952
- Founding location: Chicago, Illinois, United States
- Years active: 1952–present
- Territory: Chicago, Indiana, Florida, Iowa, Alabama, Wisconsin, Michigan
- Ethnicity: Mostly European Americans and Some Latino Americans
- Membership: 1,000–2,000
- Activities: Extortion, battery, assault, gun trafficking, intimidation, murder
- Allies: People Nation, Latin Kings, Insane South Side Popes, 12th Street Players, Indiana Aryan Brotherhood, Vice Lords, Latin Brothers
- Rivals: Folk Nation, Insane Deuces, Simon City Royals, Insane Spanish Cobras, Maniac Latin Disciples, C-Notes, Insane North Side Popes

The Almighty Gaylords Nation is a European American Chicago street gang founded in 1952. The gang is part of the People Nation alliance and are known for disrupting rival gangs near Kilbourn Park.

== Origins and history ==
The Almighty Gaylords Nation, founded in 1952, is one of Chicago's oldest street gangs, originating in the West Town neighborhood at the intersection of Grand Avenue and Noble Street. Initially composed mostly of Italians, it also included some Latino Americans, reflecting the ethnic diversity of the area, which was recognized as one of Chicago's "Little Italies". Their initial claimed street corners included Huron and Throop, where they frequented Angie's, Grand and Ogden, and Ohio and Noble.

The Gaylords quickly gained control over approximately half of the West Town area and all of Noble Square, establishing clubhouses and baseball teams. By the late 1950s, their primary clubhouse was located at the corner of Ohio and Noble Street. Among their earliest rivals were the C-Notes, Lazy Gents, and Playboys. Notable original Ohio and Noble Gaylords included Anthony "Johnny Boy" Anarina, and Bobby Shipbaugh. There were other clubs in Chicago with the name Gaylords (unrelated to the Gaylords of West Town/Noble Square) such as the Little Village Gaylords, which formed in 1950 and disbanded during the Vietnam War when many members enlisted; and the Gaylords club in the Taylor Street area, which originated sometime before 1954.

In the 1960s, the Gaylords expanded their territory into the Pilsen neighborhood, particularly at 18th and Western, and notably in Logan Square, Lawndale, Altgeld, and Kilbourn Park. As European-American middle-classes moved to the suburbs, leaving poor Whites in increasingly Latino American (specifically Puerto Rican and Mexican) and black slums, more turf became available for the Gaylords. By 1979, during the peak of their influence, the Gaylords ranked as the fourth most powerful gang in Chicago, boasting around 1,500 members. They were known as "Chicago's largest White street gang...considered a violent, bigoted outfit." In 1970, they were suspected of involvement in the murder of a black Chicago citizen named Joe Henson, although no charges were filed. A later feature article in the Chicago Reader alleged police and political cover-up.

During their peak period, the Chicago Gaylords had sets (or sections) across the North Side, West Side, and the South Side of Chicago. By the early 1980s, the Gaylords ranked as the third most prominent gang in Chicago, boasting 6,000 members. On the West Side, they controlled sections at Ohio and Noble, Ohio and Leclaire, and Monticello and Augusta. Their South Side territory included Back of the Yards and West Englewood (around 55th and Ashland, Sherman Park), Pilsen (18th and Western), and Bridgeport (Throop Street). On the North Side, they were present in Belmont Cragin, Manor Bowl, Reinberg School, Chopin Park, Blackhawk Park, St. Gens., Humboldt Park (Moffat and Campbell), Logan Square (Palmer and California, Lawndale and Altgeld), Irving Park (Albany and Byron), Kilbourn Park (Roscoe and Kilbourn), Kelvyn Park (Kilbourn and Wrightwood), Dunham Park (Montrose and Narragansett), Ravenswood (Seeley and Ainslie), and Uptown (Sunnyside and Magnolia, Lawrence and Broadway). Two of their most potent sections were in Logan Square: Lawndale and Altgeld (L-A section) and Palmer and California (Palmer Street).

By the early 1990s, the Gaylords experienced a decline as many of their leaders were incarcerated, and the remaining white population moved from the inner city to the suburbs. In 2011, police and federal agents arrested nine members of suburban Gaylords factions on charges of drug dealing, gun trafficking, and violent intimidation.
