= Gangster Disciples =

Criminal organization and street gang

- Founded: 1966; 60 years ago
- Founder: Larry Hoover
- Named after: Supreme Gangsters, Devils Disciples, Black Gangster Disciples
- Founding location: Chicago, Illinois, U.S.
- Years active: 1966–present
- Territory: Chicago, Illinois; New York City; Massachusetts; Pennsylvania; Richmond, Virginia; Houston, Texas; Norfolk, Virginia; Indianapolis, Indiana; Charlotte, North Carolina; Raleigh, North Carolina; South Carolina; Indiana; Jackson, Mississippi; Nashville, Tennessee; Huntsville, Alabama; Milwaukee, Wisconsin; Colorado; Florida; Georgia; Northeastern; Midwestern; Denmark; France; Westhill, United Kingdom; Mexico; Germany; Sweden
- Ethnicity: Primarily African American
- Membership (est.): 30,000 members in Chicago and spreading into at least 35 other states with several thousand more members. Membership-count overseas remains unknown.
- Leader: Larry Hoover (formerly)
- Activities: Drug trafficking, assault, firearms violations, fraud, homicide, money-laundering, organized crime
- Allies: Sureños 13; Folk Nation; Simon City Royals Tiny Rascal Gang (in Michigan)
- Rivals: Black P. Stones; Black Disciples (conflict); Bloods; Latin Kings; People Nation; Vice Lords; Mickey Cobras
- Notable members: Lil JoJo; FBG Duck; 22Gz; Young Pappy

The Gangster Disciple Nation (often abbreviated as the GDs; formally GDN, or simply Gangster Disciples), also known as Growth & Development, is an African-American street- and prison-gang founded by former rivals David Barksdale (1947-1974) and Larry Hoover (born 1950); in 1968, the two came together to form the Black Gangster Disciple Nation (BGDN).

Post-1989, following growing tension between its component parts, the BGDN split into two new factions: Larry Hoover's Gangster Disciple Nation (GDN) and the Black Disciple Nation (BDN). As of 2022, following Hoover's departure, the GDN has no full-time gang leader.

== History ==
The origins of the Gangster Disciples began in Englewood (in Chicago, Illinois's South Side) in 1964, when then 13-year-old Larry "The King" Hoover joined a small street gang called the Supreme Gangsters. For years, the Supreme Gangsters had an outstanding war with the Black Disciples Nation, led by David Barksdale. In 1969, Hoover and Barksdale agreed to a ceasefire. This resulted in the creation of the Black Gangster Disciple Nation. By the early 1970s, the BGDN dominated the Chicago gang scene. Barksdale died of kidney failure in 1974, at the age of 27. Following his death, Hoover assumed full control of the Black Gangster Disciples.

=== Folks Nation ===
In 1978, the BGDN began to splinter into three distinct factions: Black Gangsters, Black Disciples and Gangster Disciples; however, Hoover (at the time incarcerated on murder charges) prevented it by quickly setting up an alliance of all street and prison gangs in his interest into one family.

The alliance consisted of Gangster Disciples, Black Disciples, Satan Disciples, Latin Disciples, Spanish Gangster Disciples, Ambrose, Two-One Boys, Two-Two Boys, Two-Sixers/Two-Six Boys, Simon City Royals, North Side Insane Popes, La Raza, Spanish Cobras, Imperial Gangsters, Harrison Gents, and the Latin Eagles.

=== Expansions ===
The Gangster Disciples are active in over 100 cities and 50 states, predominantly in the Midwestern and Southeastern United States, and remnants also maintain a significant presence in the U.S. prison system. The gang had between approximately 50,000 and 90,000 members. The gang had expanded through the North and West Sides of Chicago, as well as Indianapolis, Minneapolis, Kansas City, Detroit, Milwaukee, Cincinnati, Birmingham, Hattiesburg, and co-founder Hoover's birthplace of Jackson. They first emerged in significant numbers in Memphis, Tennessee in the 1980s, the first modern street gang to do so.

=== Splintering of the Black Disciples ===
In 1989, Hoover's attention of the Black Gangster Disciples began to die down as he focused solely on the Gangster Disciples, enraging parts of the BGDN's subsets and the Folk Nation. Members of the Black Disciples decided to splinter from the Black Gangster Disciples, resulting in the reinvention of the original gang name and the incorporation of the new Gangster Disciples. Other members who felt disrespected by Hoover's declining orders decided to get his attention again by instigating gang-related shootings toward the new GD's. Two noted shootings that related to the dispute between the two Disciple gangs was a drug-related shooting that killed some members of the Gangster Disciples and the 1991 revenge murder of Black Disciple leader Mickey "Bull" Johnson.

== Notable incidents of gang-related violence ==
On July 3, 2005, men claiming to be members of the Gangster Disciples street gang killed Sergeant Juwan Johnson of the U.S. Army in the small town of Hohenecken (part of the city of Kaiserslautern) near Ramstein, Germany. Prosecutors accused U.S. Air Force Senior Airman Rico Williams of being the first one to start attacking Johnson in a six-minute beating that he had to endure to join the gang. After the beating Johnson asked one of his fellow gang members to take him to the hospital. Williams then ordered his gang members not to take him there. Johnson later died from multiple blunt-force trauma injuries. According to the government's investigations, Williams was the leader of the gang set operating on base. Senior Airman Williams was sentenced to 22 years in prison, while other servicemen faced sentences ranging from 2 to 12 years. Some of the charges against the servicemen were: Williams, second-degree murder and witness tampering; Air Force Staff Sergeant Jerome Jones, conspiracy to commit assault, gang participation, and other charges; Airman Nicholas Sims and Army Sergeant Rodney Howell; involuntary manslaughter; Private Terrance Norman, voluntary manslaughter.

The Gangster Disciples were originally implicated in the Lester Street Massacre, the name given to the 2008 murders of gang member Cecil Dotson Sr., his fiancée Marissa Williams, fellow member Hollis Seals, and his girlfriend Shindri Roberson. Also killed were Cecil's sons, 4-year-old Cemario and 2-year-old Cecil Dotson II. It was later determined that Cecil and his family were murdered by Dotson's own brother, Jessie Dotson, who eventually confessed to the killings and was convicted on all counts. The family dispute was found to be unrelated to the Gangster Disciples.

On July 21, 2020, a car pulled up to a funeral home in Chicago's Englewood area, and two gunmen infiltrated the property, opening fire. Fifteen people were wounded, with no reported fatalities. The funeral was for a victim killed a week prior, and was allegedly involving a dispute between two Gangster Disciples factions. At least 60 shots were fired, and there were victims "all up and down 79th street".

== Arrests and incarcerations ==
In 1989, a member of the Gangster Disciples was arrested on felony drug-related offenses. He was found guilty and sentenced to 28 years in prison.

On April 27, 2016, 32 members of Gangster Disciples were arrested on RICO charges by federal agents. Among the 32 arrested was a former Atlanta-area police officer who prosecutors say was a hit man for the gang. The indictment alleges that Gangster Disciples members committed 10 murders, 12 attempted murders, 2 robberies, the extortion of rap artists to force the artists to become affiliated with the Gangster Disciples, and fraud resulting in losses of over $450,000. In addition, the Gangster Disciples trafficked in large amounts of heroin, cocaine, methamphetamine, illegal prescription drugs, and marijuana. The indictment also seeks forfeiture of 34 different firearms seized as part of the investigation.

On January 25, 2021, seven members of the gang throughout Naperville, Illinois, and Cape Girardeau, Missouri, were all arrested and charged with RICO-related federal charges. The charges alleged that on April 28, 2018, three members under a leader's order, allegedly killed Leroy Allen as part of a leadership dispute at a Gangster Disciples meeting in Bridgeton, Missouri. A month later, on May 18, two other members allegedly killed Ernest Wilson, a rival board member, in Chicago. Other acts of violence alleged as part of the conspiracy include a nightclub stabbing in East St. Louis, Illinois, a nonfatal shooting in Cape Girardeau and multiple unsuccessful murder plots. The seven-member indictment also claimed drug trafficking by two members, including a scheme to smuggle the synthetic drug "K2" into a Scott County, Missouri state prison.

On February 25, 2025, reputed Gangster Disciples gang member and sex offender James Robert Stiver was captured in El Paso, Texas.

=== Indictment, incarceration and departure of Larry Hoover ===
On August 22, 1995, after a 17-year undercover joint investigation by the Illinois Department of Corrections, Federal Bureau of Investigation, Bureau of Alcohol, Tobacco, Firearms and Explosives, Hoover was arrested for conspiracy, extortion, money laundering, drug-related offenses, and continuing to engage in a criminal enterprise. The investigation used wiretaps to determine that Hoover was still operating in illegal activities within the GDs. In 1997, he stood trial in the U.S. District Court for the Northern District of Illinois. Hoover was found guilty on all charges. He was sentenced to three additional life terms in federal prison. Hoover is currently serving his sentence at the ADX Florence in Fremont County, Colorado.

In July 2022, Hoover claimed to have renounced his gang ties, ending his affiliation with the Gangster Disciples.

== Symbolism/colors ==
The predominant symbols of this gang are the trident and the Star of David, the former a reference to Folk Nation, and the latter a reference to co-founder David Barksdale, also known as King David.

== See also ==
- OutLaw Gangster Disciples
- Gangs in Chicago
