= TAP Boyz =

The Arabian Posse (TAP)
- Founding location: Chicago, Illinois, United States
- Years active: 1992–1999
- Territory: Chicago, Bridgeview, Illinois
- Ethnicity: Arab, namely Palestinian, Syrian, and Lebanese.
- Criminal activities: drug trafficking
- Allies: Latin Kings
- Rivals: Gangster Two-Six Nation, Almighty Ambrose Nation, Insane Gangster Satan Disciples Nation, Insane Two-Two Boys Nation

The TAP Boyz (an acronym for The Arabian Posse, sometimes Tall Arabian Posse), was a Chicago-based Palestinian street gang or self-described "movement" formed on the corner of West 63rd Street and South Kedzie Avenue in 1992. They disbanded in 1999 after losing members to Gangster Two-Six and Almighty Ambrose in the area.

The Posse was formed in response to anti-Arab sentiment from rival gangs. The movement's goal was to protect the Palestinian community from racially motivated assaults precipitated by the Gulf War. Their gang colors are white and red and their gang symbol is a four pointed star, though they occasionally use a moon and crescent to represent allegiance to Islam, which most members practice.
