= Almighty Saints =

Street gang in Chicago, Illinois, U.S.

- Founding location: Back of the Yards, Chicago, Illinois, United States
- Years active: 1960s–present
- Territory: New City, Chicago
- Ethnicity: Hispanic-American (originally Polish-American)
- Criminal activities: Drug trafficking, murder
- Rivals: People Nation, Folk Nation, Gangster Disciples, La Raza Nation, Gangster Two Six, Satan's Disciples, Latin Kings

The Almighty Saints is a street gang founded in the early 1960s by Polish youth at Davis Square Park in the Back of the Yards neighborhood of Chicago, but later was largely made up of Hispanics due to the change in the community's ethnic makeup.

The name "Saints" was borrowed from the TV series of the same name as evidenced by the similarities between the stickman used on the show and the street gang.

The Saints have maintained the same territory since the 1960s, an uncommon occurrence in Chicago, where gangs usually lose terrain over the years. By the 1980s, the gang had become extremely violent and drug trafficking became very lucrative.

In a 1998 feature article, the Chicago Tribune wrote: "In a city known for its fearsome supergangs—criminal enterprises like the Latin Kings and the Gangster Disciples—the Saints stand out as an example of the street corner gang that still hangs on in many neighborhoods."

== People Nation ==
After the formation of the People Nation and Folk Nation during the 1980s, the Saints initially decided to remain renegades, refusing to align with either Nation. By the late 1980s to early 1990s, many Saint gang members were incarcerated within the prison system which led the Saints to join the People Nation for protection. They were brought into the People Nation by the Almighty Latin Kings as cousins, hence the addition of "Almighty" ... and the five-point star.

== Recent activities ==
In 1998, a 12-year-old boy shot two teen Gangster Disciple members in the Back of the Yards neighborhood, in the hope of joining the Almighty Saints street gang. The 12 year old was later convicted in juvenile court and sentenced to prison until his 21st birthday.

In December 2004, there was a police raid in the Saints neighborhood dubbed "Operation Broken Halo"; 25 members were arrested and detained in prison on drug dealing and weapons charges. The Saints were still very active in the Back of the Yards neighborhood.

On February 12, 2006, 23-year-old Francisco Romero, a member of the Saints, escaped from Cook County Jail along with five other inmates. He had been convicted of murder and sentenced to 45 years in prison. He was later captured.

On May 4, 2018, at approximately 3:15 a.m., 27 year old Almighty Saints gang member Ernesto "Ernie" Godinez was acting as a lookout in Chicago's Back of the Yards neighborhood when he opened fire on members of an undercover joint task force who he mistook as rival gang members, striking 28 year old ATF agent Kevin Crump. Crump and other agents were placing court-approved tracking devices on vehicles belonging to suspected gang members during a joint mission between the Chicago Police Department and the Bureau of Alcohol, Tobacco, Firearms and Explosives. Kevin Crump and other members of the strike force were acting on information that the Almighty Saints gang in the Back of the Yards might have just received a number of guns. Crump was a member of the strike force created in June 2017 to cut down on the flow of illegal guns into Chicago and to crack down on repeat gun offenders. 20 ATF agents and a number of officers from the Chicago Police Department and the Illinois State Police were assigned to the task force. No other officers were hurt in the incident. Kevin Crump was the 4th law enforcement officer shot in the city's Back of the Yards neighborhood during that past year, the Tribune reported.

In previous incidents, two Chicago police officers were shot with a high-powered rifle while driving in an undercover van in May 2017. One officer was hit in the arm and hip, the other in the back. Another officer was shot in the leg in July 2017 while chasing down robbers in the vicinity of 46th Street and Ashland Avenue. The Back of the Yards neighborhood had become a hotbed for gang-related shootings during the past two years leading to the deaths of 50 people out of more than 140 who were shot by gang members wielding rifles across the South and Southwest sides. ATF agent Kevin Crump was not hit by rifle fire. Sources said 9 mm bullet casings, presumably from the suspect's handgun, were found by investigators. A Chicago police officer also returned fire but did not manage to hit anyone. The shooting prompted a massive manhunt for the gunman. Hundreds of officers from specialized gang and organized crime units were reassigned to take part in the search for the shooter. A $61,000 reward was offered in the case. The FBI and ATF each offered a $25,000 reward for information leading to an arrest. The U.S. Marshals Service committed $10,000 and community activist Andrew Holmes $1,000. Police and federal agents scoured the Back of the Yards neighborhood for days after the shooting executing at least eight search warrants.

On the evening of May 7, 2018, Godinez turned himself in to federal agents after his attorney arranged his surrender with authorities. According to some sources, the terms of surrender were worked out during conversations that took place over the weekend. On May 8, 2018 Godinez was charged with assault of a Federal Officer with a deadly weapon in the shooting of an ATF agent in Chicago’s Back of the Yards neighborhood as undercover law enforcement agents conducted a "covert" middle-of-the-night operation. The charges were announced by John R. Lausch Jr., United States Attorney for the Northern District of Illinois; Celinez Nunez, Special Agent in Charge of the Chicago Field Division of the U.S. Bureau of Alcohol, Tobacco, Firearms & Explosives; and Eddie T. Johnson, Superintendent of the Chicago Police Department. On May 16, 2018, Godinez, 28, was formally indicted on a single count of assaulting an ATF agent with a deadly weapon. Assistant U.S. Attorney Nicholas Eichenseer said footage showed Godinez driving around his block in the Back of the Yards neighborhood shortly before the shooting, "essentially patrolling the neighborhood, presumably on the lookout for rival gang members." Godinez’s lawyer, Lawrence Hyman, argued that evidence against Godinez was flimsy. "Authorities had no evidence showing that Godinez even had a gun that night," he said. Hyman called allegations that Godinez shot at someone a half a block away, "an absurdity." He also suggested that the agent may have been struck by friendly fire.

On May 21, 2018 Godinez pled not guilty to charges accusing him of shooting an undercover federal agent. Prosecutors alleged that Godinez fired five rounds from the mouth of the gangway towards the agents down the block striking the victim in the face. Godinez's lawyer, Lawrence Hyman, had ridiculed the evidence in court as "flimsy", noting that the video didn’t show Godinez in possession of a gun that night. On June 17, 2019 a federal jury deliberated for less than three hours before finding Ernesto "Ernie" Godinez guilty on one count each of assaulting an agent with a deadly weapon and of discharging a firearm in furtherance of a crime. Federal prosecutors said that surveillance cameras captured Godinez leaving his house at 43rd and Wood Streets before walking down an alley toward 44th and Hermitage, he then ran back through the alley to his house after the attack. While the shooting itself was not captured, prosecutors alleged that Godinez fired five rounds from the mouth of the gangway towards the group of undercover agents. Shortly after the shooting, prosecutors said Godinez hopped into a car with his girlfriend, Victoria Jean-Baptiste and allegedly told her, "I feel good . . . f--- that flake."

In his closing argument, Assistant U.S. Attorney Nicholas Eichenseer said that cameras — as well as Godinez’s text messages with his girlfriend — showed that he had "posted up" in the neighborhood looking for rivals when several suspicious-looking men in hooded sweatshirts began circling his block in a brown Chevrolet Impala. At the time, the task force officers — including Crump — were dressed in sweatshirts with their hoods up and were driving unmarked vehicles according to Assistant U.S. Attorney Kavitha Babu. Feeling that "something was about to go down," Godinez sprinted through an alley to his home and retrieved a gun, then made his way back up the gangway knowing that it offered perfect cover, Eichenseer said. As the undercover agents walked down the street half a block away, Godinez fired off five rounds in their direction then ran back to his house and texted his girlfriend to come pick him up. When he got in the car, Godinez was sweating and out of breath. Defense attorney Lawrence Hyman used his closing argument to point out a person in a white shirt who also appeared on surveillance video. One of the ATF agents at the scene the night of the shooting testified that after the shooting started, he turned and saw "an individual with a white shirt down the block." Hyman also told jurors that Godinez had stashed his marijuana in a trap house in the gangway and ran away after the shooting began. "He did not fire a gun at all," Hyman said. However, Assistant U.S. Attorney Kavitha Babu called the idea of a mystery shooter in a white shirt a "distraction." That person appeared on the surveillance video nearly a half-hour before the shooting, she said. Five fresh bullet casings were found in the gangway, from which the shooter would have had a clear shot at the ATF agent, prosecutors said. A ShotSpotter sensor also indicated that the shots came from the gangway. Prosecutors said a bullet entered ATF agent Kevin Crump’s neck and exited between his eyes. Crump suffered permanent damage to his vision, no longer had tear ducts in his left eye, and sustained nerve damage on the left side of his face. Crump, who testified on December 4th, 2019, needed several reconstructive surgeries including steel mesh and titanium implants to repair his injuries. Godinez faced up to 20 years in prison for the assault conviction, and a minimum of 10 additional years for the firearm conviction. On December 4, 2019, U.S. District Judge Harry Leinenweber sentenced Godinez to 16 years and 8 months in prison.
