= Four Corner Hustlers =

American street gang founded in West Garfield Park, Chicago

- Founded: the late 1960s
- Founded by: Walter "King" Wheat and Freddy Gauge
- Founding location: West Garfield Park, Chicago, Illinois, U.S.
- Years active: 1960s–present
- Territory: Chicago, Memphis, North Carolina, Detroit, Atlanta, Milwaukee
- Ethnicity: black American
- Membership: 1,000+ (1994)
- Criminal activities: Drug trafficking, robbery, street-level drug distribution, assault, auto theft, firearms violations, fraud, murder, prostitution rings, money laundering, and racketeering.
- Allies: People Nation, Black P. Stones, Latin Kings, Vice Lords
- Rivals: Folk Nation, Gangster Disciples
- Notable members: Common

The Four Corner Hustlers (4CH) is an American street gang founded in the West Garfield Park neighborhood on the West Side of Chicago in the 1960s by Walter "King" Wheat and Freddy Gauge. The Four Corner Hustlers at first were a single gang that would wear the colors black and brown.

In 1977, the Four Corner Hustlers became allies with the Vice Lords. The gang has a reputation to be the most violent and feared street gang on the West Side of Chicago.

== Symbols ==
The Four Corner Hustlers primarily use the colors black and gold. Similar to the Vice Lords other People Nation gangs, the Four Corners Hustlers represent themselves with a champagne glass, the Playboy bunny, a globe, a crescent moon with a five-pointed star, a pair of dice, a top hat with a cane and glove, and a black diamond.
