= Maniac Latin Disciples =

Street gang

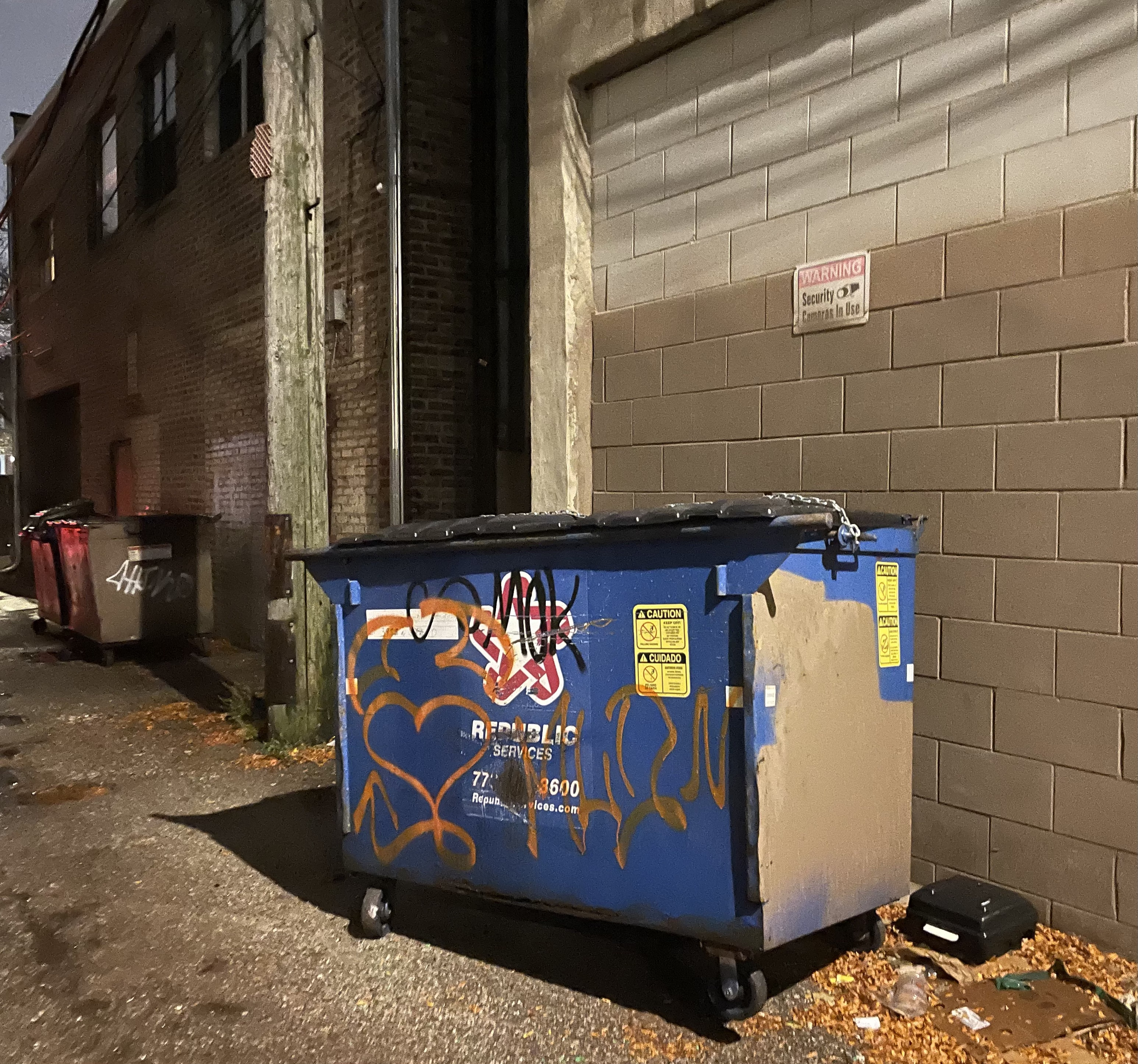
- Founded: 1966
- Named after: Albert "Hitler" Hernandez
- Founding location: Humboldt Park, Chicago, Illinois, United States
- Years active: 1966–present
- Territory: Chicago metropolitan area, Ohio, Quad Cities, Boston, Wisconsin, Michigan, Indiana, Tennessee, Texas, New York and Florida.
- Ethnicity: Hispanic-American
- Membership (est.): 7,500-10,000
- Activities: Drug trafficking, assault, auto theft, robbery, homicide, money laundering, weapons trafficking
- Allies: No Allies
- Rivals: Latin Kings, Spanish Cobras, Latin Eagles, Four Corner Hustlers, Black P. Stones, Simon City Royals, Ambrose, Vice Lords, Gaylords, Almighty Saints, La Raza, Mickey Cobras

The Maniac Latin Disciples (often abbreviated as MLD) are a predominantly Hispanic, but multi-racial street gang based in Chicago, Illinois.

== Identifiers ==
Maniac Latin Disciples display black and light blue colors. Identifiers include a heart with a devil's tail and horns, a hooded character called the Monk, swastika, and the trident. Another common identifier among Maniac Latin Disciples is use of a blackletter font D for the Disciples alliance, similar to that of the Detroit Tigers "D" logo.

== History ==
The Maniac Latin Disciples originated as a Humboldt Park baseball club of Puerto Rican kids in the mid-1960s. They were harassed and jumped (physically assaulted) by white gangs such as the Simon City Royals, Almighty Gaylords and Harrison Gents. The club fought back to protect themselves and got respect on the street, earning them back-up from the Black Disciples. The Latin Scorpions merged with another Latino club ran by Ernesto “Capper” Flores and turned into a full-fledged gang in 1966, calling themselves the Latin Disciples. A scrappy junior high boy named Albert "Hitler" Hernandez would position himself as ‘King’ of the new adolescent gang on Hirsch & Rockwell. Around 1970 the first Latin Disciples went to prison for aggravated assault & battery. They had a meeting with the Black Gangster Disciples (today split into the Black Disciples and Gangster Disciples) and established a business relationship on the inside and outside.

Albert “King Hitler” Hernandez was killed at 18 years old in 1972 by two Latin Kings. He asked them to remove their gang colors while walking through Latin Disciple’s turf. This ended in a brawl with those two Latin Kings, and Hernandez being stabbed to death. From then on the Latin Disciples Nation went to war with the Latin Kings.

The Latin Disciples soon opened up shop on the infamous drug corner Rockwell & Potomac known as “The Twilight Zone”. The gang’s power increased on the northwest side with their domination of the illegal heroin trade. Latin Disciple sections spread throughout Humboldt Park at Thomas & Washtenaw “Murder Town”, Washtenaw & Hirsch, Maplewood & Wabansia, and Talman & Wabansia “Wild Side or “T-Dub”. In 1976 Division & Avers opened in West Humboldt Park and in ‘77 the Kedzie & Barry set opened in Logan Square and quickly branched out. This caused increased resentment among opposing Latin Kings and Insane Unknown Kings whose territory was getting encroached on. A year later, Chi-Chi D, the Latin Disciple President of KB, was gunned down by Insane Unknowns.

The Latin Disciples Nation joined the "Folks Alliance" of gangs in 1978.
