= Two Six (gang) =

Street gang based in Chicago

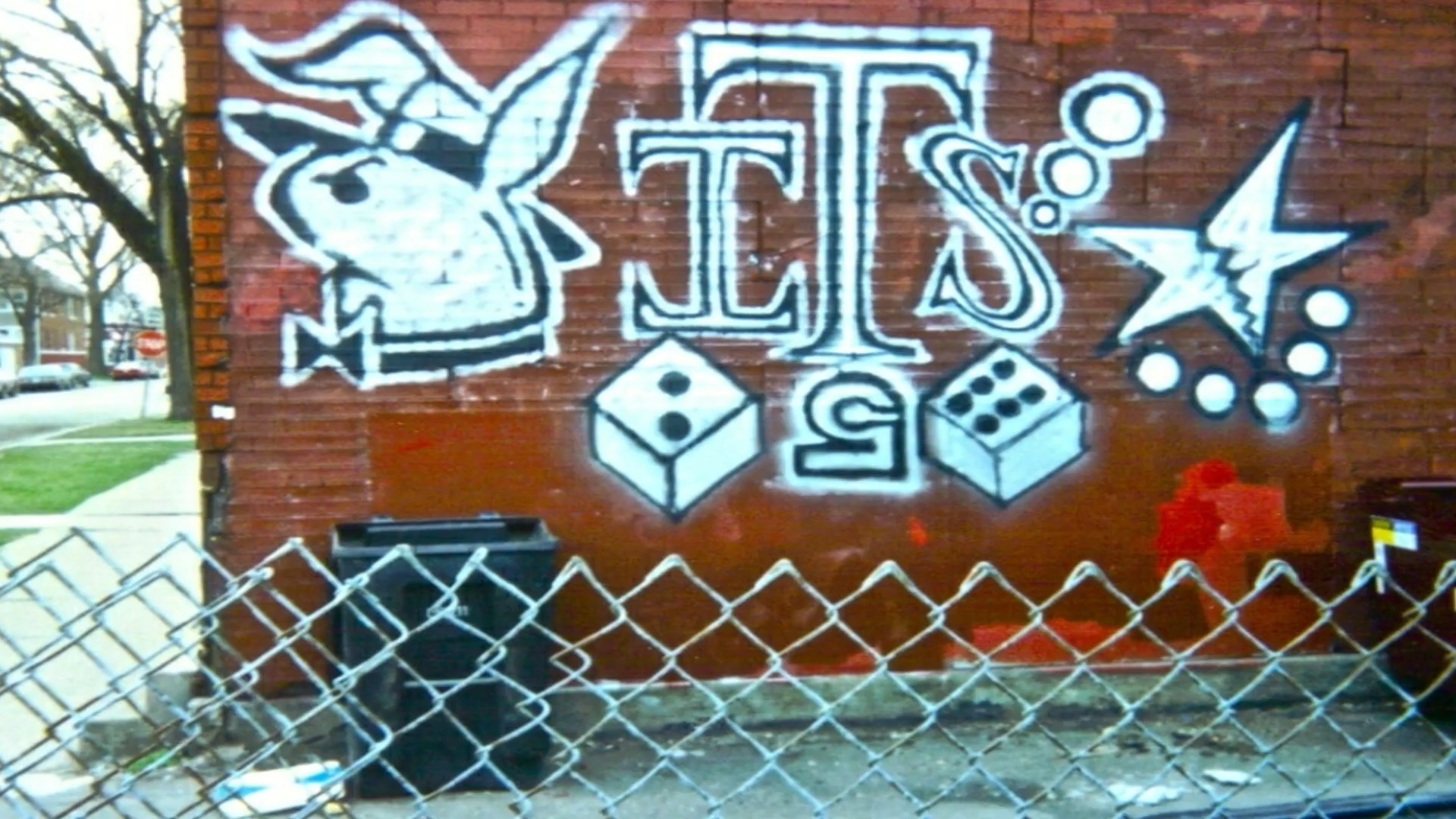
- Two Six graffiti
- Founded: 1964; 62 years ago
- Named after: 26th Street
- Founding location: Chicago, Illinois, U.S.
- Years active: 1964–present
- Territory: Chicago; East Chicago, Indiana; Iowa; Texas; Georgia; Kansas; Wisconsin
- Ethnicity: Predominantly Hispanic and Latino
- Membership (est.): 2,370
- Activities: Murder, drug trafficking, robbery, kidnapping
- Allies: Folk Nation
- Rivals: Almighty Saints, Imperial Gangsters, Latin Kings, Satan Disciples

The Gangster Two-Six Nation, also known simply as Two Six, is an American street gang based in Chicago. The gang is predominantly Hispanic and Latino.

== History ==
The Gangster Two-Six Nation was started in 1964, in the South Lawndale neighborhood of Little Village. In 1975, Two Six joined the Folk Nation alliance.

=== Operation Bunny Trap ===
In November 2014, federal and local authorities began an investigation of Two Six named "Operation Bunny Trap" after the gang's rabbit symbol. Authorities said the gang had terrorized neighborhoods on Chicago's South Side and in the suburbs for decades. Investigators found gun and drug dealing in a Brighton Park pizza parlor, and arrests followed in May 2017. Authorities seized 118 firearms, 800 grams of cocaine, and amounts of methamphetamine and fentanyl. As a result, around 45 members and associates of Two Six were arrested, with 27 being charged in Cook County Criminal Court, and 21 in Northern District of Illinois Court.

== Territory ==
The gang controls the eastern part of the Little Village, which includes Piotrowski Park, the biggest park in the neighborhood. The gang has sets in East Chicago, Indiana, Iowa, Georgia, Kansas, Texas, and Wisconsin.

== Symbols ==
The gang uses various symbols to identify themselves with the most common symbol being a Playboy bunny with the right ear bent, wearing a fedora and sunglasses, and a tattoo with three dots. The gang also uses a pair of dice with the two on one side and six on the other, and the letters TS or TSN.
