= Folk Nation =

American alliance of street gangs

Folks Nation
- Founded: 1978; 48 years ago
- Founder: Larry Hoover
- Founding location: Stateville Correctional Center, Crest Hill, Illinois, U.S.
- Years active: 1978–present
- Territory: Nationwide
- Ethnicity: Any (multiethnic)
- Leader: Larry Hoover
- Criminal activities: Drug trafficking, burglary, armed robbery, extortion, homicide
- Allies: Various Crips and Tiny Rascal Gang factions
- Rivals: People Nation gangs

The Folks Nation is an alliance of street gangs originating in Chicago, established in 1978. The alliance has since spread throughout the United States, particularly the Midwestern United States.

== Formation ==
The Folks Nation was formed on November 11, 1978, within the confines of the Stateville Correctional Center in Illinois. Larry Hoover, the chairman of the Gangster Disciple Nation, created the idea for the alliance and persuaded many leaders of large black, white, and Latino gangs from Chicago to join.

== Symbols ==
All gangs that are members of the Folk Nation represent their allegiance by utilization of the Star of David, the digit 6, the Roman numeral VI, and a die with six dots visible. Most gangs under the Disciple moniker use horns, a devil's tail, a pitchfork, a horned heart, and a winged heart. Other prominent symbolism of Folk gangs include the digit 2 (used by the Insane Deuce Nation and Insane Two-Two Nation), the digit 3, three dots, a symbol known as the Third World (digit 3 within a circle with a horizontal curved line through the center) representing the power, solidarity and ubiquity of the third world proletariat, the digit 4 (used by Insane Two-Two Nation and the Almighty Harrison Gent Nation), the digit 7 (used by the Almighty Imperial Gangster Nation), the digit 8 (used by the Insane Ashland Viking Nation), the number 13 (used by the Milwaukee King Nation), the Playboy bunny (used by all Gangster Familia nations excluding the Gangster Disciple Nation along with the Boss Pimp Nation), a cane (used by the Almighty Harrison Gent Nation and the Latin Jiver Nation), a top hat (used by the Almighty Harrison Gent Nation and the Latin Jiver Nation), a crown with seven rounded steps (used by Almighty Imperial Gangster Nation, sometimes the Gangster Disciple Nation), a six point crown (represents entire Folk Nation though modern usage is typically by the Insane Gangster Satan Disciple Nation), numerous cross variants, and the number 360, "360°" or phrase "360 degrees", usually used to refer to their international presence (360 degrees around the globe) though it has other meanings within Folk literature.

Folk gangs also disrespect People Nation gangs by inverting or "cracking" (adding crack marks to or removing half of a gang symbol) their symbols.

== Affiliated gangs ==
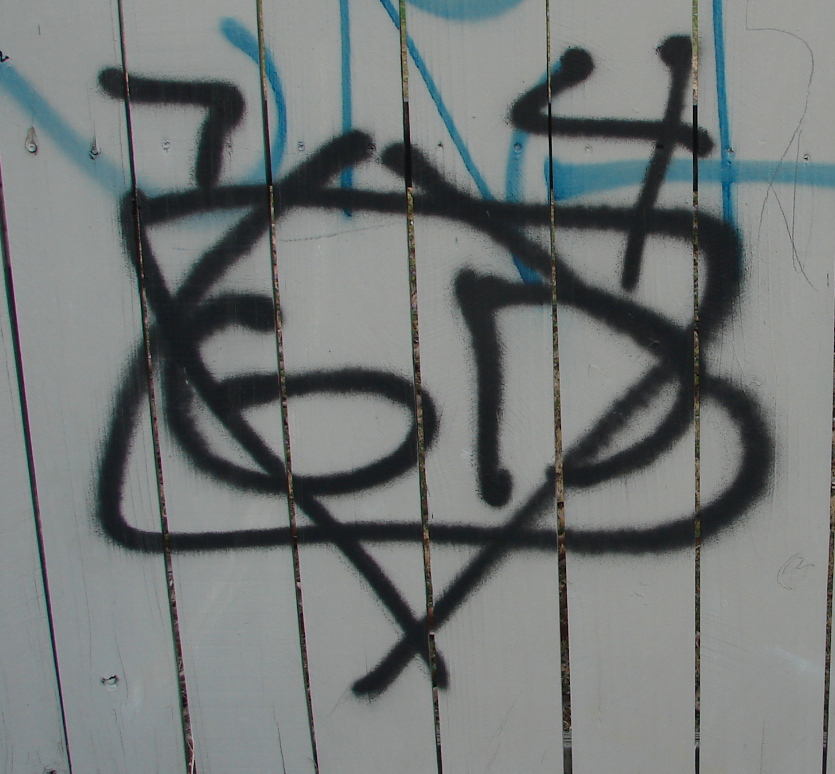
Gangster Disciple Nation graffiti

Affiliated gangs include:

- Latin Eagles
- Simon City Royals
- Black Disciples
- Gangster Disciple Nation
  - Spanish Gangster Disciples
- La Raza Nation
- Maniac Latin Disciples
- North Side Insane Popes
- Spanish Cobras
- Two Six
