= Latin Eagles =

Street gang in Chicago, US

- Founded: 1964
- Founding location: Chicago, Illinois, United States
- Years active: 1964–present
- Territory: Chicago metropolitan area
- Ethnicity: Puerto Rican
- Allies: Folk Nation
- Rivals: Gangster Disciples; People Nation; Spanish Gangster Disciples

The Almighty Latin Eagles Nation (commonly shortened as Latin Eagles, abbreviated as ALEN) originated in the area of Halsted and Addison on the Northside of Chicago during the mid-1960s. Famous for spawning a strong Latino political organization in the late 1960s called the Young Lords, but by the 1970s the Eagles had transformed into a nefarious criminal street gang.

== Identification ==
Members of the Latin Eagles Nation identify themselves with the colors grey and black. They also use the symbols of an eagle head or an eagle in flight. They also use the symbols of the Universal Fork and used to rep the pitchfork associated with the Folk Nation, but no longer after their war with the SGD's and GD's.

== History ==
The Latin Eagles formed on the north side of Chicago, Illinois in 1964 as a Puerto Rican club of kids to combat the white greaser gangs who bullied them. Eventually the club turned into a street gang.

The Latin Eagles fought against a greaser gang to take over their first piece of turf at the LeMoyne Elementary School playground by Waveland & Halsted. Then the Eagles rumbled and drew blood with the Aristocrats to take over Grace & Wilton, now known as “The Motherland”.

The Latin Eagles, Latin Kings and Harrison Gents all fought for control of Lakeview High School during this time, which ended with a Latin Eagle murdering a Gent leader in 1966 and the Eagles taking control of the neighborhood. In 1968 the Gents took revenge, and with a golf club, beat a Latin Eagle to death named Hipólito Vega who becomes a gang martyr.

Also in ‘68, two Latin Eagles and Latin American immigrants, "Pops" and Jose "Cha-Cha” Jimenez were inspired by the Black Panthers and the Civil Rights Movement. Jimenez was just released from prison and the two Eagle homeboys branched off the gang with a small faction to start a community political group for Puerto Ricans. They wanted to fight against "a corrupt system, racism, and segregation" calling themselves the Young Lords Organization. Members became involved in local politics and influential. The Young Lords expanded to New York City and formed chapters across the country.

Back in the hood, disputes over Northside turf made the Latin Eagles mortal enemies with the Latin Kings and PR Stones as the Almighty Latin Eagles recruited and moved into Wrigleyville, Uptown, Rogers Park, by Irving Park & Ashland, and established their stronghold at Gill Park on Sheridan & Broadway.

The Latin Eagles became enemies of all People gangs when they joined the prison Folks alliance of Larry Hoover and his Black Gangster Disciples, Simon City Royals, Ashland Vikings, Latin Disciples and others in 1978. On the street, The Latin Eagles were members of ULO (United Latino Organization) and became Folks alongside their ULO brothers; the Latin Disciples, Spanish Cobras, and Imperial Gangsters.

In 1985 the Eagles branched into the West Side around Kostner & Armitage at Kenneth & Armitage and Palmer & Kenneth “Darkside”. In this ‘hood the Eagles rode with Spanish Cobras and Maniac Latin Disciples who were in the process of conquering Kelvyn Park against the Stoned Freaks. The Latin Eagles moved their strongest operations here by the mid 1990’s, becoming a permanent nation on these streets.

In 1989, the Almighty Latin Eagles threw a party at Caguas Nightclub on North Ave and invited Spanish Cobras, MLD’s and Campbell Boys. A dispute between a Cobra and an Eagle broke out and a gun was pulled. The argument spilled outside into the street and the two gangs eventually started to rumble. A Wrigleyville Latin Eagle named “Lil Rook” was beaten to death with a wooden 2x4 during the riot. This was the beginning of the Spanish Cobra-Latin Eagle conflict. They went to war for a couple weeks, but temporary peace was restored. A war involving the Latin Eagles and the Gangster Disciples started in the summer of 1995 as SGD's moved into the hood, eventually taking over Broadway & Cuyler.

During the mid-1990s, the Almighty Latin Eagles formed an alliance with the Almighty Imperial Gangsters and Simon City Royals as the Almighty Folks Familia. By the end of the decade they would go into a permanent bloody war with the Insane Familia led by the Spanish Cobras and the Maniac Famila ran by the Maniac Latin Disciples.
