= Spanish Cobras =

Street gang from Humboldt Park, Chicago, USA

Insane Spanish Cobras Nation
- Founded: 1970s
- Founding location: Chicago, Illinois, USA
- Territory: Chicago (North Side and West Side); Florida, Michigan, Ohio, Wisconsin
- Ethnicity: Latinos of Puerto Rican and Mexican descent; some Caucasian and African American/Afro-Latino
- Leader: Anibal "Tuffy C" Santiago
- Allies: Folk Nation gangs
- Rivals: Maniac Latin Disciples, People Nation gangs (including Latin Kings)

The Spanish Cobras is a primarily (but not exclusively) Latino street gang, present in multiple states throughout the Midwestern United States, with a strong presence on the north and west sides of Chicago, Illinois.

== History ==
The Spanish Cobras were founded in the 1970s by former members of the Maniac Latin Disciples.

In 1989, leaders of the Spanish Cobras, the Maniac Latin Disciples, and the Two Sixers met to establish the Spanish Growth and Development (SGD), a structured organization, in an attempt to control the increasing number of shootings in Chicago. Modeled after the Chicago Outfit, the SGD had a "strict set of rules [and] dispute-mediating mechanisms", though it failed to stop the violence and eventually collapsed.

In February 1996, the escalation of the Insane—Maniac war made headlines in the Chicago Tribune.

== Territory ==
They are known to operate in parts of Illinois, as well as in Milwaukee, Racine and Kenosha in Wisconsin, and in Detroit. Law enforcement has also reported Spanish Cobras in Ohio, Connecticut, Orlando, Ft Myers and South Florida.
