= Gang presence in the United States military =

Criminal gangs within the United States military

About one to two percent of United States Armed Forces members are estimated to belong to criminal gangs in the United States, a much higher proportion than in the civilian population.

== Extent ==
In 2008, according to FBI gang investigator Jennifer Simon, 1 to 2% of the U.S. military belonged to gangs, which is 50 to 100 times the rate in the general population. According to the Federal Bureau of Investigation's 2011 National Gang Threat Assessment, the NGIC identified members of more than 53 gangs who served in the military. U.S. gangs have sometimes encouraged their members to join the military in order to learn warfare techniques.

The FBI's 2007 report on gang membership in the military stated that the military's recruit screening process is ineffective, and allows gang members and extremists to enter the military. The report listed at least eight instances in the previous three years in which gang members obtained military weapons for their own use.

The report "Gang Activity in the U.S. Armed Forces Increasing", dated January 12, 2007, stated that street gangs including the Bloods, Crips, Black Disciples, Gangster Disciples, Hells Angels, Latin Kings, The 18th Street Gang, Mara Salvatrucha (MS-13), Mexican Mafia, Norteños, Sureños, and Vice Lords have been documented on military installations both domestic and international, although recruiting gang members violates military regulations.

== Notable cases ==
=== White power skinheads ===
In 1995, James N. Burmeister and Malcolm Wright Jr were charged in the murder of an African American couple in North Carolina. Burmeister and Wright were in the U.S. Army, and part of Fort Bragg's 82nd Airborne Division. Burmeister and Wright were both arrested at a trailer park where police found a 9-mm semiautomatic pistol, a Nazi flag, white supremacist pamphlets, and other gang paraphernalia. Both men were sentenced to life in prison.

Former skinhead T.J. Leyden was in the U.S. Marines. He spent 15 years in the Skinhead movement before renouncing racism, and going to work as a consultant for Simon Wiesenthal Center in Los Angeles.

=== Gangster Disciples ===
On July 3, 2005, members of the Gangster Disciples street gang killed Sergeant Juwan Johnson of the U.S. Army in the small town of Hohenecken near Ramstein, Germany. Prosecutors accused U.S. Air Force Senior Airman Rico Williams of being the first one to start attacking Johnson in a six-minute beating that he had to endure to join the gang. After the beating Johnson asked one of his fellow gang members to take him to the hospital, Williams then ordered his gang members not to take him there. Johnson later died from multiple blunt-force trauma injuries. According to the government's investigations, Williams was the leader of the gang set operating on base. Senior Airman Williams was sentenced to 22 years in prison, while other servicemen faced sentences ranging from 2 to 12 years. Some of the charges against the servicemen were: Williams, second-degree murder and witness tampering; Air Force Staff Sergeant Jerome Jones, conspiracy to commit assault, gang participation, and other charges; Airman Nicholas Sims and Army Sergeant Rodney Howell; involuntary manslaughter; Private Terrance Norman, voluntary manslaughter.

=== Norteños ===
On January 9, 2005, local police officer Sam Ryno was first to respond to a call of a man with a gun in front of a liquor store in Ceres, California. Andres Raya, a U.S. Marine on leave after coming back from Iraq, was armed with an SKS rifle and opened fire on officers, hitting Officer Ryno and killing Sergeant Howard Stevenson. Raya was shot dead some time later after he opened fire on SWAT team members.

Portrayed by local media as a calculated attack on law enforcement, the Stevenson slaying sparked attention from the national media which suggested that Raya snapped due to his experience in the Iraq War. Family, friends, and fellow Marines close to Raya spoke of Raya's violent nightmares and distress which led to heavy drinking and drug use while on leave. However, local law enforcement officials claimed Raya had been involved in gangs for years prior to him signing up for military service. Modesto authorities discovered information during the investigation into the shooting that shows Raya was a Norteño gang member who was not involved in combat during his tour of duty in Iraq. A cooperative effort between the Stanislaus Sheriff's Detectives, local law enforcement, the FBI, NCIS, the U.S. Department of Justice, and the U.S. Marine Corps revealed a large amount of information about Raya in a short amount of time.

=== King Cobra Boys ===
In July 2000 in Orange County, California, members of the King Cobra Boys gang engaged in a fight with a rival gang named the Lao Family. One of the King Cobra Boys gang members was in the U.S. Marines. He was stationed at MCAS Camp Pendleton. He worked in the Marines armory, and was experienced with weapons. Using his military training, he arranged his gang members in a location where they were able to observe and ambush the rival gang members. No one was fatally injured. Authorities later arrested the U.S. Marine gang member on base. A search warrant was executed at his residence where numerous military-issued manuals for machine guns and handguns were seized.

=== Gang graffiti in Iraq ===
U.S. gang-related graffiti has shown up in Iraq since the beginning of the Iraq War in 2003. Among the largest American street gangs represented in Iraq are the Gangster Disciples, Crips, Bloods, 18th Street, Norteños, Black Disciples, Sureños, Latin Kings, TAP Boyz, Tiny Rascal Gang, Vice Lords, and Black P. Stones, which originated in some of America's most violent and impoverished neighborhoods.

== Reported gangs ==
The gangs present in the US military include:

- 18th Street
- Almighty Vice Lord Nation (abbreviated AVLN)
- Aryan Brotherhood
- Asian Boyz
- Bandidos
- Barrio Azteca
- Black Disciples
- Bloods
- Crips
- Gangster Disciples
- Hells Angels
- King Cobra Boys
- Latin Kings
- Mexican Mafia
- MS-13
- Norteños
- Sureños
- TAP Boyz
- Tiny Rascal Gang
- Vagos
- White power Skinheads

== See also ==
- Crime in the United States
- Organized crime
- List of gangs in the United States
