= Land of the Blacks (Manhattan) =

Area north of New Amsterdam

Coordinates: 40.7254°N 73.9968°W

The Land of the Blacks (Dutch: t' Erf van Negros, also Negro Frontier or Free Negro Lots) was a village settled by people of African descent north of the wall of New Amsterdam from about 1643 to 1716. It represented an economic, legal and military modus vivendi reached with the Dutch West India Company in the wake of Kieft's War. This buffer area with the native Lenape is sometimes considered the first free African settlement in North America, although the landowners had half-free status. Its name comes from descriptions in 1640s land conveyances of white-owned properties as bordering the hereditament or freehold "of the Blacks".

There were about 30 African-owned farms over about 130 acres centered in the modern neighborhoods of Greenwich Village and SoHo, including all of the area surrounding Washington Square Park.

== Development ==
The area was formerly known as Noortwyck, where the ousted Dutch governor Wouter van Twiller had owned a large tobacco farm, Bossen Bouwerie, built on the earlier Lenape settlement of Sapokanikan.

Africans in the area had experienced slavery in New Amsterdam and were controlled by the Dutch West India Company, not by private slaveholders. In 1644, eleven African men who had been under the WIC for "18 or 19 years" that likely included military experience, pressed their rights in the courts in a predecessor to freedom suits, and became recognized as part of a new half-free social class of the colony, being granted lands at about the same time. These "African Eleven", who would have arrived in 1625 or 1626, may have had seniority as the first enslaved men ever brought to the colony, predating the group from the ship Bruin Visch in 1628, which included the first African women. Africans had largely built the fortifications of New Netherland, including Fort Amsterdam and the northern palisade, and combat veterans among them may have been given preferential treatment in the assignment of lands. Enslaved Africans are also depicted on the 1639 Manatus Map as living in quarters farther north at the mouth of the Sawkill, though this is not recorded elsewhere, and may have been either an error or a temporary measure due to military efforts.

| 1 | Catalina Anthony |
| 2 | Domingo Anthony |
| 3 | Cleyn Manuel |
| 4 | Manuel de Gerrit de Rues |
| 5 | Manuel Trumpeter |
| 6 | Marycke |
| 7 | Gracia d'Angola |
| 8 | Simon Congo |
| 9 | Jan Francisco |
| 10 | Pieter San Tome |

| 11 | Manuel Groot |
| 13 | Cleyn Anthony |
| 14 | Paulo d'Angola |
| 15 | Anthony Portuguese |
| 16 | Anna d'Angola |
| 17 | Francisco d'Angola |
| 18 | Anthony Congo |
| 19 | Bastiaen Negro |
| 20 | Jan Negro |
| 21 | Manuel the Spaniard |

| 22 | Mathias Anthony |
| 23 | Domingo Angola |
| 24 | Claes Negro |
| 25 | Assento Angola |
| 26 | Francisco Cartagena |
| 27 | Anthony of the Bowery |
| 28 | Anthony the Blind Negro |
| 29 | Manuel Sanders |

The settlement was created as a buffer area (a sort of military march) by the succeeding governor Willem Kieft when Dutch people evacuated the region due to Kieft's War against the native Lenape people. Although their freedom was only partial, it is sometimes considered the first free African settlement in North America, that status being more commonly given to Fort Mose founded a century later in Spanish Florida, also as a military measure. It has been argued by historians that Atlantic Creole populations in both places came from communities in Africa with pre-existing European ties such as the Kingdom of Kongo, that helped them to negotiate improved living conditions.

Landowning families built a common cattle pen that was shared by their community, and later helped to construct the wall of Wall Street that replaced the initial palisade. Half-free status was not supposed to extend to children of the landholders under the Dutch rule, but in practice this seems to have been obviated, and plots were passed on to the next generation. Governor Stuyvesant diminished African properties by appropriating some of them to himself in Stuyvesant Farm, some through purchases and some through fiat, though most stayed intact.

After the seizure of New Netherland in 1664 and its incorporation into the Province of New York, the rights of the Free Negro social group were gradually eroded. Stuyvesant affirmed some of the properties in a letter to the English in 1665.

Shortly after the English conquest, Jasper Danckaerts wrote of the community in his travel memoir:

We went from the city, following the Broadway [ Bowery ], over the valley or the fresh water. Upon both sides of this way there were many habitations of negroes, mulattoes and whites. The negroes were formerly the slaves of the West India Company. But, in consequence of the frequent changes and conquests of the country, they have obtained their freedom, and settled themselves down where they thought proper, and thus on this road, where they have grown enough to live on with their families.

In 1702, the first of the New York slave codes were passed, which further limited freedom of the African community in New York. African land ownership in the area was effectively ended by anti-Black legislation passed after the New York Slave Revolt of 1712, which included a ban on inheritance of property. The revolt was blamed on two groups, Smith's Fly Boys in the modern East Village, and the Long Bridge Boys, after a former crossing farther downtown over the Broad Canal.

There was not a municipal government for the village, but a series of land grants. Village Preservation, using a map from The Iconography of Manhattan Island, has documented 28 land grants, which were mostly contiguous in one area. Three of the land grants were a bit to the south, and not connected to the main part.

== Legacy ==
A later neighborhood, after the dispossessions of property, was called Little Africa in Greenwich Village. Its legacy is preserved at the African Burial Ground National Monument.

A 2020 resolution by Manhattan Community Board 2 supported the commemoration of the African landholding community, otherwise publicly unmarked, and pointed to the suitability of a potential monument in Washington Square Park. In 2021, a temporary digital exhibition at the Oculus, in the spaces of Westfield World Trade Center, was put on by artists of Black Gotham Experience.

== See also ==
- Negro Dutch
- Seneca Village
