= Gangs in the United States =

American criminal groups or organizations

Almighty Latin King Nation graffiti of the "King Master" along with the abbreviations "L" and "K" on the sides.

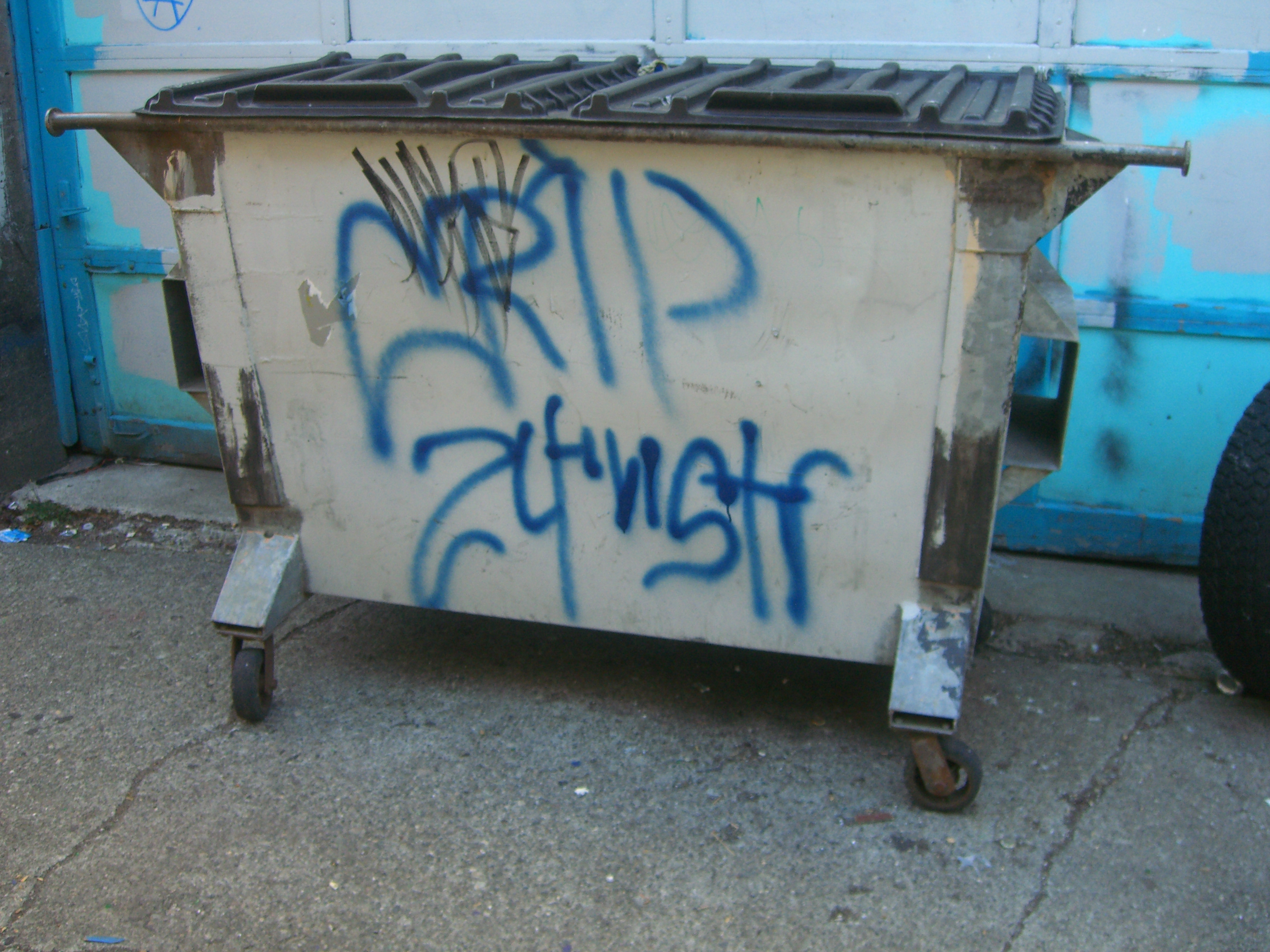
Street tag of the 24th Street Crips gang in Olympia, Washington, in 2007

Approximately 1.4 million people in the United States were part of gangs as of 2011, and more than 33,000 gangs were active in the country. These include national street gangs, local street gangs, prison gangs, outlaw motorcycle clubs, and ethnic and organized crime gangs.

Many American gangs began, and still exist, in urban areas. In many cases, national street gangs originated in major cities such as New York City and Chicago but they later grew in other American cities like Albuquerque and Washington, D.C.

Street gangs can be found all across the United States, with their memberships differing in terms of size, racial and ethnic makeup, and organizational structure. The most significant danger is posed by prominent national street gangs, as they engage in the smuggling, production, transportation, and distribution of substantial amounts of illegal drugs, often resorting to extreme violence. In an attempt to earn recognition from their adversaries, local street gangs frequently emulate the larger and more influential national gangs. Over time, loosely structured street gangs pose a growing threat by expanding their involvement in drug trafficking, especially in the smuggling of drugs into the United States, and establishing connections with international criminal groups and drug trafficking organizations (DTOs).

== History ==
The earliest American street gangs emerged at the end of the American Revolutionary War in the early 1780s. However, these early street gangs had questionable legitimacy, and more serious gangs did not form until at least the early 1800s. The earliest of these serious gangs formed in northeastern American cities, particularly in New York.

=== Early street gangs in the Northeast: 1780–1870 ===
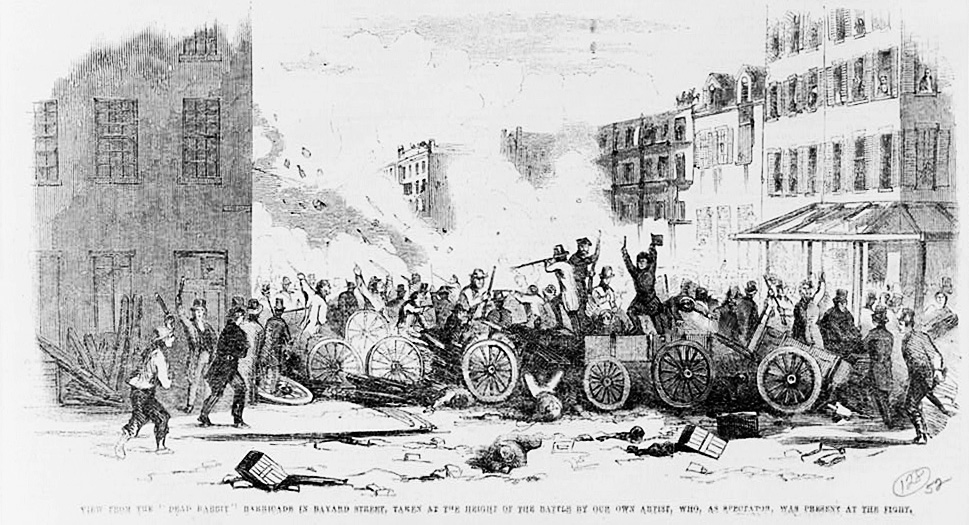
View of fight between two gangs, the Dead Rabbits and the Bowery Boys, New York City, 1857

In the 18th century, slaves living in New York formed two paramilitary groups which could be seen as "gang" like, Smith's Fly Boys and the Long Bridge Boys. Notable examples of slave rebellions (as well as white backlash to the perceived threat of them) in colonial New York include the New York Slave Revolt of 1712 and the New York Conspiracy of 1741. In the early 1800s, three main immigrant groups entered the Northeast US via New York: English, Irish, and German. On the Lower East Side of New York, these immigrant groups formed into gangs in an area known as the Five Points. Of these were the Smiths's Vly gang, the Bowery Boys, who recruited from the native white population and were typically anti-Irish and anti-migrant, and the Broadway Boys, which were predominantly Irish immigrants. These early gangs were not exclusively engaged in criminal activity; their members often were employed as common laborers.

After the early 1830s, however, gangs began to focus on criminal activity, one example being the Forty Thieves, which began in the late 1820s in the Five Points area. Other criminal gangs of the pre-Civil War era included the Dead Rabbits and the Five Points Gang. The Five Points Gang in particular became influential in recruiting membership to gangs and toward establishing gang relationships with politicians. The New York City draft riots were said to have been ignited by young Irish street gangs. Herbert Asbury depicted some of these groups in his history of Irish and American gangs in Manhattan, and his work was later used by Martin Scorsese as the basis for the motion picture Gangs of New York. However, these early gangs reached their peak in the years immediately prior to the Civil War, and gang activity largely dissipated by the 1870s.

=== Reemergence and growth: 1870–1940 ===
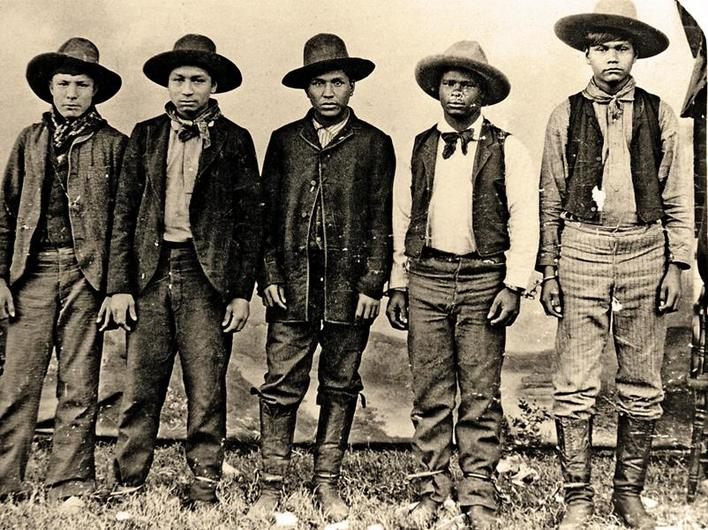
The historical Rufus Buck Gang (1895)

During the late 1800s, gangs reemerged as a criminal force in the Northeast, and they emerged as new criminal enterprises in the American West and the Midwest. In New York after the Civil War, the most powerful gang to emerge was the Whyos, which included reconstituted members of previous Five Points area gangs. Another late 19th century New York gang was the Jewish Eastman Gang. Meanwhile, Chinese immigrants formed tongs, which were highly structured gangs involved in gambling and drug trafficking. These tongs were matched in strength by an emerging Italian organized crime network that became the American Mafia.

Gangs emerged in the Midwest in the late 19th and early 20th centuries in Chicago. European immigrant groups such as Poles and Italians formed the core membership of Chicago gangs, while only 1% of gangs were black. However, gangs in the 19th century were often multiethnic, as neighborhoods did not display the social polarization that has segregated different ethnic groups in the postmodern city (see Edward Soja). The gangs of Chicago in the late 19th century were particularly powerful in the areas around the Chicago Stockyards, and engaged in robbery and violent crime.

As in New York and northeastern gangs, it was during the early period of Chicago gang growth that gangs connected themselves politically to local leaders. Such gangs as Ragen's Colts became influential in Chicago politics. By the 1920s, several gangs had grown to the point of becoming organized crime groups in Chicago (e.g., the Chicago Outfit under Al Capone), and gang warfare was common among them. Street gang activity continued alongside these larger criminal organizations; contemporary estimates suggested some 25,000 gang members and 1,300 gangs in Chicago during the late 1920s. By the early 1930s, however, these immigrant-dominated gangs largely died out.

Just as with the Midwest, the American West experienced gang growth during the late 19th century and early 20th century. The earliest Los Angeles gangs were formed in the 1920s, and they were known as "boy gangs"; they were modelled on earlier social groups of Latino and Chicano men known as palomilla. Frequently these groups were composed of Mexican immigrants upon coming to the United States. The youth of this culture became known as the cholo subculture, and several gangs formed from among them.

By the 1920s, cholo subculture and palomilla had merged to form the basis of the Los Angeles gangs. The gangs proliferated in the 1930s and 1940s as adolescents came together in conflict against the police and other authorities. Territoriality was essential to the Los Angeles gangs, and graffiti became an important part of marking territory controlled by gangs. Neighborhood identity and gang identity merged in ways unlike other parts of the United States; in addition, the gangs of the West were different in their ethnic makeup. Finally, they were unique in that, unlike gangs in the Midwest and the Northeast, they did not grow only out of social problems such as poverty, but also out of ethnic segregation and alienation.

=== Postwar growth and change: 1940–1990 ===
Gang Boy (1954) by Sid Davis Productions

Gangs reemerged in the Northeast in cities such as New York during the second half of the twentieth century with rising Latino immigration, especially from Puerto Rico in the 1940s and 1950s, as well as a rising population of Black Americans migrating from the American South. Although New York built large, urban high-rise public housing in the 1940s, much of the public housing was built in low-rise form and in outer areas during the 1950s and 1960s; the effect of this was to mitigate much of the gang-on-gang violence that other American cities suffered in that period. During this time, there was also a lot of urban renewal headed by Robert Moses on the Upper West Side of Manhattan, where low-income neighborhoods, many of which were home to lower-class Puerto Rican, black, and white Americans, were being demolished to create more middle and upper class housing. However, this only escalated gang conflict, as New York saw gangs nonetheless form among the youth of the Latino, black, and white population as neighborhoods became smaller and populations were pushed closer together, resulting in turf wars for the small amount of land they had left. Various pre-existing European gangs (Irish, Italian, Jewish, German, etc.) united under a "white" identity to combat the onset of Puerto Rican and black migration. In 1957 there were 11 murders perpetrated by gangs in Manhattan. By the end of the 1960s, two-thirds of gangs in the city were black or Puerto Rican. Youth gang conflict was depicted in popular media, such as West Side Story in 1957, which brought more attention to the issue.

The re-emergence of Midwestern gangs also occurred after the rapid increase in the black population of northern American cities. During the 1910s and 1920s, the Great Migration of more than one million black people to these cities created large, extremely poor populations, creating an atmosphere conducive to gang formation. The significant and rapid migration created a large population of delinquent black youth, forming a pool of potential gang members, while black youth athletic groups fueled rivalries that also encouraged gang formation. A final factor encouraging gang formation was the Chicago race riot of 1919, in which gangs of white youth terrorized the black community, and in response black youth formed groups for self-protection.

However, the actual formation of Midwestern black gangs only began after World War II, concomitantly with the Second Great Migration. It was in the late 1940s, 1950s and 1960s that black gangs such as the Devil's Disciples, the Black P-Stones and the Vice Lords were formed. By the late 1960s, the construction of public housing in Chicago allowed gangs to consolidate their power in black neighborhoods, and the Vice Lords, P-Stones, and Gangster Disciples controlled the drug trade of the area. These and others emerged as "super gangs" with more than 1,000 members each by the 1970s.

During and after the 1940s, gangs in the American West expanded dramatically as a result of three factors: expanding immigration from Mexico and the resulting xenophobia, the Sleepy Lagoon murder, and the Zoot Suit Riots. The two latter events served to unify the Mexican immigrant population and turned many youth into gang members, thus creating the cholo subculture. It was also from the 1940s to the 1960s that black gangs emerged as a criminal force in Los Angeles, largely as a result of social exclusion and segregation. Racial anti-black violence on the part of white youths directly contributed to black youths forming self-protection societies that transformed into black gangs by the late 1960s.

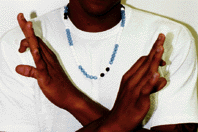
A Crips gang handsign

As the War on Poverty began to shift into the war on crime, the idealism of the social movements of the 1960s gave way to ideas of "revolutionary suicide" as police violence against Black Panthers and other radicals began to take its toll. Influential leaders of the black community had been killed, including Medgar Evers, Malcolm X, Martin Luther King Jr. and Fred Hampton. Author and social activist bell hooks wrote, "After the slaughter of radical black men, the emotional devastation of soul murder and actual murder, many black people became cynical about freedom". This "nihilism", as Cornel West put it, spread after the 1960s.

Black gangs of Los Angeles began forming into territorial-based groups by the early 1970s, and two federations of black gangs, the Bloods and the Crips, emerged during that period. The practice of allying local street gangs together into federated alliances began during the 1960s and expanded rapidly across the United States during the 1970s and 1980s. Out of the prison system of Illinois came two gang alliances by the late 1970s, the Folk Nation and the People Nation. These two alliances included a variety of white, black, and Hispanic gangs and claimed territory in and around Chicago and other Midwestern cities. Another of these federated alliances were the Latin Kings, originally a Chicago-based Latino gang. In the case of the West, nearly every major city in California reported gang activity by the mid-1970s, and often it was related to gangs affiliating themselves with the Bloods or Crips.

==== Vice Lords ====
The Vice Lords Nation was established in 1958 in Chicago, Illinois, with the intention of assisting African Americans in overcoming poverty and discrimination within their local community. However, as time passed, the organization transformed into one of the largest criminal groups in the United States, expanding its presence to nearly every city and town across the country. Engaging in a range of illicit activities such as drug trafficking, robbery, extortion, and murder, the Vice Lords Nation has become notorious for its involvement in criminal endeavors. Primarily operating in the Midwest and southern regions of the United States, the gang boasts a substantial membership estimated to be between 30,000 and 35,000 regular and associate members. Despite being recognized as a criminal organization by the US government and witnessing numerous high-profile arrests, the Vice Lords Nation continues to maintain its significant influence and presence, particularly in Chicago.

==== Barrio Azteca ====
Barrio Azteca, also known as Los Aztecas, originated as a prison gang in the El Paso prison system in Texas in 1986. With an estimated 3,000 members in the United States and around 5,000 in the Juarez region of Mexico, the gang has extended its reach to states such as Massachusetts, Pennsylvania, and New Mexico. Despite not being a large gang, Barrio Azteca distinguishes itself through the extreme level of violence that frequently crosses borders.

==== Mongols Motorcycle Club ====
The Mongols Motorcycle Club, established in Montebello, California during the 1970s, is widely recognized as an infamous outlaw motorcycle club. Their influence extends across the Pacific and southwestern regions of the United States, boasting chapters in California, Nevada, Arizona, and various other states. While the club primarily consists of Hispanic members, it also encompasses individuals from diverse ethnic backgrounds. Throughout the 1980s and 1990s, the Mongols garnered notoriety as a formidable and violent motorcycle club. Their involvement in criminal activities such as assault, intimidation, and murder is well-documented, including a highly publicized clash with members of the rival Hells Angels gang in Las Vegas in 2002.

=== Contemporary activities: 1990–present ===
By the 1990s, Northeastern gangs (white, black, and Latino) had come into conflict as a result of urban renewal and ethnic migration. The Northeast had more than 17,000 gang members and more than 600 gangs in 2008, and Pennsylvania saw heavy growth of gang activity. During the 2000s, the most active gangs in the region were federations of the Crips, the Latin Kings, MS-13 (Mara Salvatrucha), NETA, and the Bloods.

In the American West, as job cuts continued to rise and employers began to hire from the cheaper labor pool of the expanding Latino immigrant community, unemployment rates of African-American men reached as high as 50% in several areas of South Los Angeles, opening up large recruitment markets for the burgeoning gangs. The increasing social isolation felt by African-American communities across the nation continued unabated in the 1980s and 1990s, leading to higher rates of social pathologies, including violence. Latino gang members interviewed in Napa said they had moved to the valley either to join family or to find a job, or were motivated by other social pressures like release from a nearby juvenile correctional facility.

As gang violence accelerated in the West, so too did police violence against African-American communities, which culminated in the arrest of Rodney King that sparked the 1992 Los Angeles riots. In the aftermath of the riots, leaders of the Bloods and the Crips announced a truce (spearheaded by Compton's then-mayor Walter R. Tucker, Jr.), and in May 1992, 1,600 rival gang members converged on Imperial Courts, a main housing project of Watts, Los Angeles, California to demonstrate their new-found companionship. But after only a few months of relative harmony, tensions between Los Angeles County's more than 100,000 gang members (in February 1993) began to raise the murder rates, rising to resemble previous levels. Oakland, California saw 113 drug- and/or gang-related homicides in 2002 alone, and 2003 sported similar figures. The 1995 murder of Stephanie Kuhen in Los Angeles led to condemnation from President Bill Clinton and a crackdown on Los Angeles-area gangs.

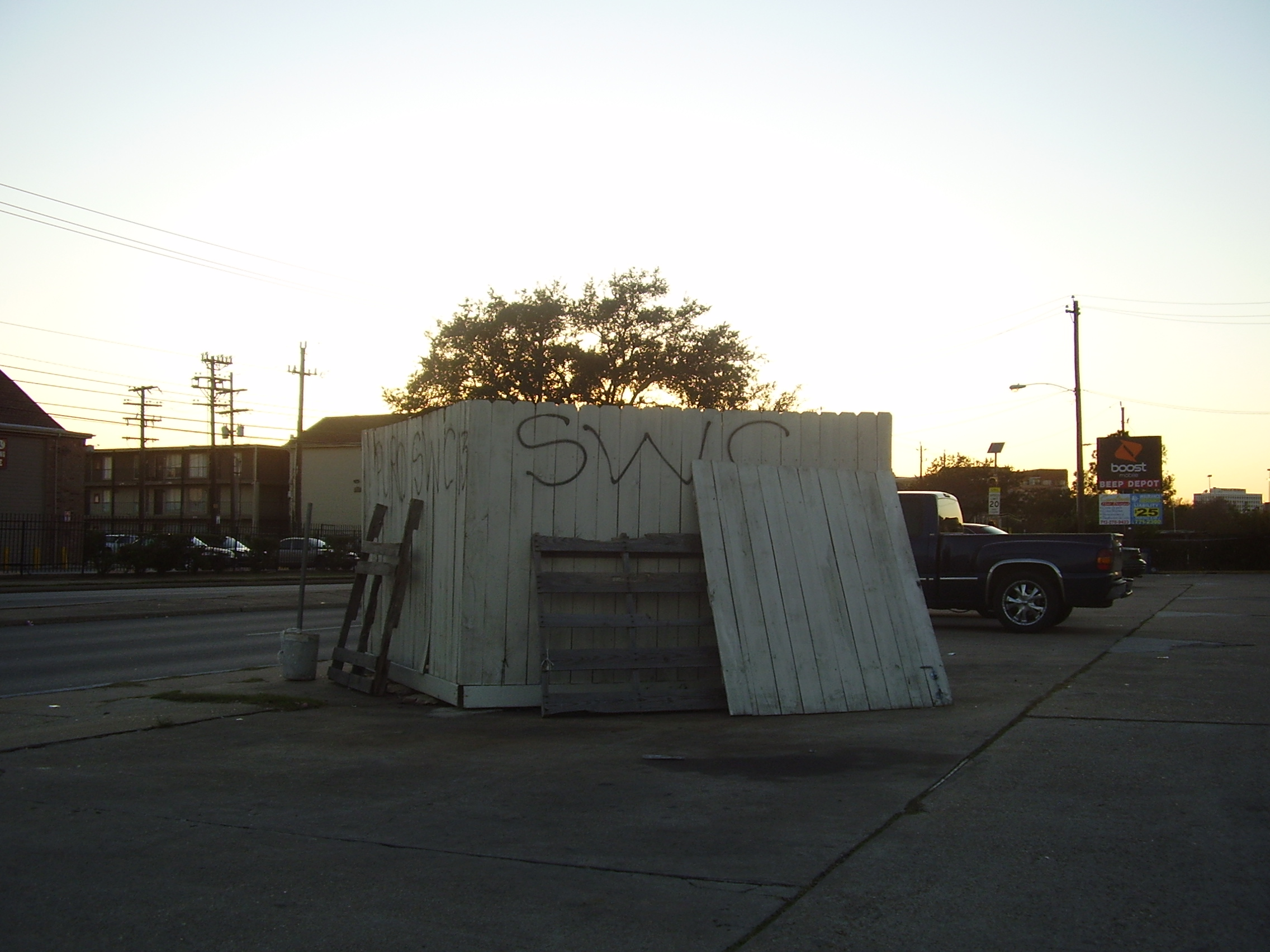
Southwest Cholos graffiti, Gulfton, Houston

During the 1990s, the American South saw an increase in gang activity that had not been seen previously. In 1994, Mary Beth Pelz, a criminologist at the University of Houston–Downtown, said that Texas lacked "a rich history of street gangs" compared to other parts of the United States. She said Houston area gangs began to branch out to newer developments in the 1980s. According to a 2006 Texas Monthly article by Skip Hollandsworth, many street gangs in Texas have no organized command structures. Individual "cliques" of gangs, defined by streets, parts of streets, apartment complexes, or parts of apartment complexes, act as individual groups. Texas cliques tend to be headed by leaders called "OGs" ("original gangsters"), and each clique performs a specific activity or set of activities in a given area, such as controlling trafficking of recreational drugs and managing prostitution.

In 2009, David Kennedy, director of the Center for Crime Prevention and Control at John Jay College of Criminal Justice of the City University of New York, said that a lot of violence in inner cities in the United States is mislabeled as "gang violence" when in fact it involves small, informal cliques of people.

As gang members and factions continued to grow, the introduction of cheap crack cocaine to American cities would prove fatal. Crack money now could be used to purchase unprecedented amounts of weaponry, and as newly armed gang members began to fight over "turf", or the territory in which gangs would run their lucrative drug-trades, violence soared, as the FBI's national data of gang-related homicides show: from 288 in 1985 up to 1,362 in 1993.

The targeted killing of the 9-year-old Tyshawn Lee, the son of a Chicago gang member who was lured into an alley and shot in 2015, marked a new low in gang violence, associated with the splintering of gangs into less organized factions often motivated by personal vendettas.

==== 2020s ====
Tren de Aragua began to extend its presence throughout the United States during this time. Telemundo, citing cases against suspected members of the gang, wrote in March 2024 that it shows "an increasingly widespread presence of the band also in the United States." In January 2024, the Federal Bureau of Investigation confirmed reports that the gang was operating in the United States. On July 11, 2024, the US Treasury Department and the White House announced sanctions against the gang and applied the "transnational criminal organization" designation. The State Department began offering a $12 million reward for information leading to the arrest of the organization's leaders. In 2024, U.S. officials at the U.S.-Mexico border began interrogation of single Venezuelan male migrants in order to screen for Tren de Aragua members.

Tren de Aragua first appeared in Chicago and its suburbs in October 2023. FBI agents in El Paso, Texas reported that 41 suspected members of the Tren de Aragua were arrested in 2023.

== Recruitment ==
People join gangs for various reasons. Some individuals become gang members to profit from organized crime in order to obtain necessities such as food or to gain access to luxury goods and services. They may be seeking protection from rival gangs or violent crime in general, especially when the police are distrusted or ineffective. Many are attracted to a sense of family, identity, or belonging. Other motivations include social status, intimidation by gang members, pressure from friends, family tradition, and the excitement of risk-taking. For most, it is usually a combination of a number, if not all, of these factors.

Studies aimed at preventing youth involvement in gangs have identified additional risk factors that increase one's likelihood of joining a gang. Some risk factors that relate to one's family life are family instability, family members with violent attitudes, family poverty, and lack of parental supervision. Victims of violent crime (as well as their friends and family) and members of socially marginalized groups (e.g., ethnic minorities) are more likely to join gangs. Academic problems such as frustration due to low performance, low expectations, poor personal relationships with teachers, and the presence of learning disabilities are all risk factors. Hyperactivity, low self-esteem, and lack of role models can contribute as well. Involvement in non-gang illegal activity (especially violent crime or drug use) and a lack of youth jobs also increase a person's likelihood of becoming a gang member.

Gang membership is also associated with early sexual activity and illegal gun ownership.

Youth may join gangs due to a lack of other opportunities, such as after-school social programs and extracurricular activities. If a child has thought about or already joined a gang, support groups can help the parents with the next steps. The availability of sports or interest groups may reduce the interest in associating with delinquent individuals. When youth join in other social groups, such as a church group or study group, it increases the strength of their social bonds, which when broken or weakened are a cause for delinquent participation.

== Activities and types ==
As of 2011, the National Gang Intelligence Center found that American gangs were found to be responsible for "an average of 48% of violent crime in most jurisdictions and up to 90% in several others". Major urban areas and their suburban surroundings experience the majority of gang activity, particularly gang-related violent crime.

Gangs are known to engage in traditionally gang-related gambling, drug trafficking, arms trafficking, white collar crime such as counterfeiting, identity theft, and fraud, as well as non-traditional activities, such as human trafficking and prostitution.

Gangs can be categorized based on their ethnic affiliation, their structure, or their membership. Among the gang types defined by the National Gang Intelligence Center are the national street gang, the prison gang, the motorcycle gang, and the local street gang.

=== Prison gangs ===
American prison gangs, like most street gangs, are formed for protection against other gangs. The goal of many street gang members is to gain the respect and protection that comes from being in a prison gang. Prison gangs use street gang members as their power base for which they recruit new members. For many members, reaching prison gang status shows the ultimate commitment to the gang.

Some prison gangs are transplanted from the street, and in some occasions, prison gangs "outgrow" the penitentiary and engage in criminal activities on the outside. Many prison gangs are racially oriented. Gang alliances like the Folk Nation and People Nation have originated in prisons.

One notable American prison gang is the Aryan Brotherhood, an organization known for its violence and white supremacist views. Established in the mid-1960s, the gang is not affiliated with the Aryan Nations and allegedly engages in violent crime, drug trafficking, and illegal gambling activities both in and out of prisons. On July 28, 2006, after a six-year federal investigation, four leaders of the gang were convicted of racketeering, murder, and conspiracy charges. Another significant American prison gang is the Aryan League, which was formed by an alliance between the Aryan Brotherhood and Public Enemy No. 1. Working collaboratively, the gangs engage in drug trafficking, identity theft, and other white collar crime using contacts in the banking system. The gang has used its connections in the banking system to target law enforcement agencies and family members of officers.

=== Motorcycle gangs ===
A 2013 report by the National Drug Intelligence Center on a motorcycle club.

The United States has a significant population of motorcycle gangs, which are groups that use motorcycle clubs as organizational structures for conducting criminal activity. Some motorcycle clubs are exclusively motorcycle gangs, while others are only partially compromised by criminal activity. The National Gang Intelligence Center reports on all motorcycle clubs with gang activity, while other government agencies, such as the Bureau of Alcohol, Tobacco, Firearms, and Explosives (ATF) focus on motorcycle clubs exclusively dedicated to gang activity. The ATF estimates that approximately 300 exclusively gang-oriented motorcycle clubs exist in the United States.

=== Organized crime gangs ===
Organized criminal groups are a subtype of gang with a hierarchical leadership structure in which individuals commit crime for personal gain. For most members of these groups, criminal activities constitute their occupation. There are numerous organized criminal groups with operations in the United States today (including transnational organized crime groups), such as the Sinaloa Cartel, American Mafia, Latin Kings, Jewish mafia, Triad Society, Russian mafia, yakuza, Sicilian Mafia, and Irish Mob.

The activities of organized criminal groups are highly varied, and include drug, weapons, and human trafficking (including prostitution and kidnapping), art theft, murder (including contract killings and assassinations), copyright infringement, counterfeiting, identity theft, money laundering, extortion, illegal gambling, and terrorism. The complexity and seriousness of the crimes committed by global crime groups pose a threat not only to law enforcement but to democracy and legitimate economic development as well.

American national and local street gangs may collaborate with organized criminal groups.

=== Juvenile gangs ===
Youth gangs are composed of young people, and like most street gangs, are either formed for protection or for social and economic reasons. Some of the most notorious and dangerous gangs have evolved from youth gangs. Youth gangs started to become prevalent in the 1940s and 1950s in Northeast cities like New York due to factors such as gentrification, neglectful homes, and immigration. Many of these were formed within racial groups and fought other ethnic gangs over turf and rapidly decreasing neighborhoods as urban renewal projects pushed out certain socioeconomic groups. The 1950s also saw a rise in juvenile delinquency, which concerned many New Yorkers, especially as Latino and black gangs were associated with it by the press. Therefore, the problem of gang violence lingered as these issues prolonged without many efforts to stop it, especially for youths of color. During the late 1980s and early 1990s, an increase in violence in the United States took place, due primarily to an increase in violent acts committed by people under the age of 20. Due to gangs spreading to suburban and smaller communities, youth gangs are now more prevalent and exist in all regions of the United States. One of the more popular youth gangs in the Midwest is the NJCK or North Jersey Cross Kids.

Youth gangs have increasingly been creating problems in school and correctional facilities. However, youth gangs are said to be an important social institution for low-income youths and young adults because they often serve cultural, social, and economic functions which are no longer served by the family, school or labor market. Youth gangs tend to emerge during times of rapid social change and instability. Young people can be attracted to joining a youth gang for a number of reasons. They provide a degree of order and solidarity for their members and make them feel like part of a group or a community.

The diffusion of gang culture to the point where it has been integrated into a larger youth culture has led to widespread adoption by youth of many of the symbols of gang life. For this reason, more and more youth who earlier may have not condoned gang behavior are more willing, or even challenged, to experiment with gang-like activity. Youth gangs may be an ever-present feature of urban culture that change over time in their form, social meaning and antisocial behavior. However, in the United States, youth gangs have taken an especially disturbing form and continue to permeate society.

The Impact of Gangs on Communities Youth gangs significantly have an impact on communities especially in densely populated areas by contributing to violence and intimidation and economic costs. The majority portion of homicides are particularly in cities like Los Angeles and Chicago are gang related.and gang activity in schools are often underreported gang involvement can lead to long term criminal behavior resulting in high costs to society. Communities address these issues to the comprehensive gang prevention and intervention and suppression model

== Demographics ==
In 1999, Hispanic Americans accounted for 47% of all U.S. gang members, African Americans for 34%, non-Hispanic whites for 13%, and Asians for 6%.

Law enforcement agencies reported in 2011 that gangs affiliated with ethnicity and non-traditional gangs had expanded in the years prior.

=== African-American gangs ===
In the late 19th and early 20th centuries, African American organized crime emerged following the first and second large-scale migrations of African Americans from the Southern United States to major cities of the Northeast, Midwest, and later the West Coast. In many of these newly established communities and neighborhoods, criminal activities such as illegal gambling (e.g. the numbers racket) and speakeasies were seen in the post-World War I and Prohibition eras. Although the majority of these businesses in African-American neighborhoods were operated by African-Americans, it is often unclear the extent to which these operations were run independently of the larger criminal organizations of the time.

=== Hispanic gangs (Mexican, Central American and Caribbean) ===
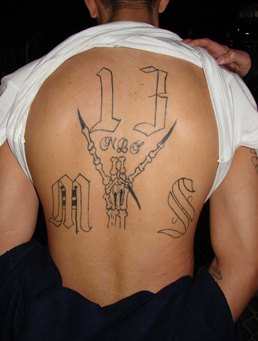
A member of Mara Salvatrucha bearing gang tattoos in Houston, Texas in 2009

U.S. immigration investigation programs, such as Operation Community Shield, have detained more than 1,400 illegal immigrants who were also gang members, just a tiny fraction of gang members nationwide. A California Department of Justice study reported in 1995 that 60 percent of the twenty thousand members of the 18th Street gang in California were undocumented immigrants.

The largest Dominican gang, Trinitarios, was the fastest-growing Hispanic gang in the Northeastern US in 2011. Although originally a prison gang, the Trinitarios have members operating as street gangs, and the organization is known for violent crime and drug trafficking in the New York and New Jersey area.

Puerto Rican gangs became especially prevalent in the latter half of the twentieth century with increased migration from the island. Many Puerto Rican youths in New York joined these gangs as there was a strong anti-Puerto Rican sentiment in the city, which caused youths to feel isolated and escape their situation by joining gangs. This sentiment was due to violent and offensive depictions of Puerto Ricans in media and press embellishment of Puerto Rican gang crime. Combined with being a part of the city's lowest income group and turf wars against white gangs, Puerto Rican gangs were often scapegoated for these crimes, emphasizing their prevalence during this time period.

One of the most notable examples of this was the 1959 case of Salvatore Agron and Antonio Hernandez, members of the Vampires, who were involved in the killing of two white teenagers and the wounding of four others in a gang-related crime. Newspapers dubbed them, "Dracula" and the "Umbrella Man", respectively, emphasizing the crime with gruesome images. However, much of the press ignored the racially charged banter between the teenagers, instead emphasizing the turf war over a park.

Mara Salvatrucha, commonly abbreviated as "MS-13", is another Hispanic street gang operating in the United States. The "13" in the name is a way to pay allegiance to the Mexican Mafia, or La Eme. It originated in Los Angeles and has spread to Central America, other parts of the United States, and Canada. Mara Salvatrucha is one of the most dangerous gangs in the United States, and its activities include drug and weapons trafficking, auto theft, burglary, assault, and murder (including contract killings). The gang also publicly declared that it targets the Minutemen, an anti-immigrant vigilante group, to give them "a lesson", possibly due to their smuggling of various Central/South Americans (mostly other gang members), drugs, and weapons across the border. Mara Salvatrucha has been investigated by the FBI and U.S. Immigration and Customs Enforcement, and in September 2005 the gang was targeted by raids against its members, in which 660 people were arrested across the United States. The US treasury department has imposed sanctions on members in MS-13 by freezing assets that are related to the gang's activities. Sanctions were imposed on six members in June 2013 and three members in April 2015. The sanctions in 2013 followed the lines of Executive Order 13581. The efforts to financially disrupt MS-13 have been a collaborative effort of ICE and the Department of Homeland Security.

=== Other ethnic gangs ===
Among other ethnic-based gangs are Asian gangs, which operate similar to Asian organized crime groups with a hierarchical structure and little concern for control of territory. Asian gangs often victimize Asian populations, and law enforcement faces difficulty investigating Asian gangs due to language barriers and distrust among the Asian population. Asian gangs engage in a variety of crime, including violent crime, drug and human trafficking, and white collar crime.

Middle-Eastern gangs operate in some cities, such as the Kurdish Pride Gang (KPG), a street gang that formed in 2000 in Nashville. The gang was involved with drug dealing, home burglaries (including two involving rapes), assault and attempted murder. Two members are serving long prison sentences for the attempted murder of a police officer.

East African gangs operate in over 30 jurisdictions in the United States. They are generally divided between Sudanese gangs, Ethiopian gangs and Somali gangs. Unlike the majority of traditional street gangs, Somali gang members adopt names based on their clan affiliation. Largely keeping to themselves, they have engaged in violent crime, weapons trafficking, human, sex and drug trafficking, and credit card fraud. As of 2013, there has been a decrease in gang-related activity among disaffected Somali youths, as they have grown more settled. Sudanese gangs have emerged in several states since 2003. Among the most aggressive of these Sudanese gangs is the African Pride gang. Some Sudanese gang members also possess strategic and weapons knowledge gained during conflicts in Sudan.

Primarily operating along the East Coast, Caribbean ethnic-based gangs include Haitian and Jamaican gangs. Haitian gangs, such as Zoe Pound, are involved in a variety of crime, including violent crime and drug and weapons trafficking. U.S.-based Jamaican gangs, unlike those in Jamaica, are unsophisticated and lack hierarchy; however, they often maintain ties to Jamaican organized crime and engage in drug and weapons trafficking.

=== Jewish Defense League ===
The FBI has classified the Jewish Defense League as a far-right terrorist organization. Established in 1968 by Rabbi Meir Kahane, the group's main goal was to safeguard Jews from anti-Semitism on a global scale. It was built upon the principles of Jewish nationalism, territorialism, and the use of force to protect Jews from their adversaries. The JDL has faced allegations of carrying out various terrorist activities, such as bombings, assassinations, and extortion.

The organization is predominantly active in the United States and Israel, where it has been involved in several violent episodes throughout the years. It rose to prominence in the 1970s, when JDL members executed numerous high-profile attacks against Arab targets in the US and Europe. Additionally, they vehemently opposed the USSR due to the restrictions on Jewish emigration to Israel. Despite its modest size, the JDL managed to attract a significant following within the Israeli-American Jewish community because of its aggressive strategies.

=== MS-13 ===
MS-13, also known as Mara Salvatrucha, is an international criminal organization that was established in Los Angeles, California, during the 1980s. Initially created to provide protection for Salvadoran refugees in the city, the group later transformed into a violent criminal entity involved in illicit activities such as drug and human trafficking. Presently, MS-13 operates in multiple countries, including the United States, El Salvador, Mexico, Honduras, and Guatemala. The gang gained widespread notoriety in the 1990s and early 2000s due to its involvement in a series of murders and assaults nationwide. Known for their brutal methods, which include the use of machetes and other melee weapons in conflicts with rival groups, MS-13 is considered a relatively small gang, with an estimated 6,000 – 10,000 members in the US. However, in Central American nations, the gang's membership could be as high as 60,000.

=== Female gang membership ===
Although female gang membership is less common than male membership, women and girls can become fully-fledged members of mixed-gender or exclusively female gangs. These gangs operate as functioning units, coed gangs, or female auxiliaries to pre-existing male gangs. National gang statistics show that 2% of all gangs are female-only, and the National Gang Center reports that around 10% of all gang members are females.

=== Gang membership in the military ===
Gang members in uniform use their military knowledge, skills, and weapons to commit and facilitate various crimes.

In 2006, Scott Barfield, a Defense Department investigator, said there was an online network of gangs and extremists: "They're communicating with each other about weapons, about recruiting, about keeping their identities secret, about organizing within the military." That same year, an article from the Chicago Sun-Times reported that gangs were encouraging members to enter the military to learn urban warfare techniques and pass them onto other gang members.

The FBI's 2007 report on gang membership in the military states that the military's recruit screening process is ineffective, allows gang members/extremists to enter the military, and lists at least eight instances in the last three years in which gang members have obtained military weapons for their illegal enterprises. "Gang Activity in the U.S. Armed Forces Increasing", dated January 12, 2007, states that street gangs including the Bloods, Crips, Black Disciples, Gangster Disciples, Hells Angels, Latin Kings, The 18th Street Gang, Mara Salvatrucha (MS-13), Mexican Mafia, Norteños, Sureños (Sur 13), White power Skinhead, King Cobras, and Vice Lords have been documented on military installations both domestic and international, although recruiting gang members violates military regulations.

A 2008 FBI report noted that between 1-2% of the U.S. military has affiliation with a gang. As of April 2011, the National Ground Intelligence Center had identified members of at least 53 gangs whose members were actively serving in the United States Armed Forces.

==== Reported gangs ====
The gangs present in the US military include:

- 18th Street
- Almighty Vice Lord Nation (abbreviated AVLN)
- Aryan Brotherhood
- Asian Boyz
- Bandidos
- Barrio Azteca
- Black Disciples
- Bloods
- Crips
- Gangster Disciples
- Hells Angels
- King Cobra Boys
- Ku Klux Klan
- Latin Kings
- Mexican Mafia
- MS-13
- Norteños
- Sureños
- TAP Boyz
- Tiny Rascal Gang
- Vagos
- White power Skinheads

== See also ==
- Crime in the United States
- Organized Crime
- List of gangs in the United States
