= Spanish Gangster Disciples =

American gang in Chicago

- Founded: early 1980s
- Founded by: Rudy Rios
- Founding location: South Chicago, Chicago, Illinois, United States
- Years active: early 1980s – present
- Ethnicity: Predominantly Latino American
- Criminal activities: Drug trafficking, assault, robbery, murder
- Allies: most of Folk Nation, Gangster Disciples, Satan Disciples, Insane Two One Boys Of 21st And Leavitt, Gangster Two Six, Vato Loko Boyz
- Rivals: People Nation, Latin Kings, Latin Counts, Spanish Cobras, Latin Eagles, Imperial Gangsters, Simon City Royals, Harrison Gents, Almighty Ambrose

The Spanish Gangster Disciples is an Indigenous Latino American street gang that originated on the south side of Chicago, respectively in the vicinity of 88th & Houston in the South Chicago neighborhood. The gang was founded by Rudy Rios, who was a former member of the Latin Scorpions street gang. It is an offshoot of the Gangster Disciples.

== Symbolism and colors ==
Like the original Gangster Disciples, the main symbol of the Spanish Gangster Disciples is the Star of David. The Spanish Gangster Disciples also use pitchforks, winged hearts with devil horns and tails, and the numbers "19-7-4" - standing for the nineteenth, seventh, and fourth letters of the alphabet respectively (S, G, and D). The gang’s colors are baby blue and black.

== History ==
The historical development of the Spanish Gangster Disciples street gang attempted to unify of all of the "Latin Folks" organizations while also involving itself in political and social undertaking. The Spanish Gangster Disciples concept originated in the year of 1974. The Spanish Gangster Disciples originated on the Southside of Chicago, in the vicinity of 88th & Houston. The gang was founded by Rudy Rios, who was a former member of the Latin Scorpions (Maniac Latin Disciples) street gang. While incarcerated years earlier, Rios was a part of a governing body called the "Spanish Growth and Development" (SGD), which was initiated in Statesville correctional facility as a way to unite and settle issues pertaining to the Latin Folks. Once released, Rios transformed the Spanish Growth and Development into the Spanish Gangster Disciples with "blessings" from the Black Gangster Disciples hierarchy. In the early 80s, members of the SGDs were incarcerated with members of the Insane Two One Boys, notably a Two One elder named Pepe, this brought a friendship with the two organizations that carried out to the streets. The SGDs concepts were similar to that of the Black Gangster Disciples from the start, although they have minor differences in structure and "literature".

== Latin Folks organization ==
In the summer of 1983, a group of Latino individuals that were Gangster Disciples from the Northside united with the Maniac Latin Disciples from Rosemont and California and decided to create a Latino organization similar to that of the Gangster Disciples and that of the Spanish Growth and Development family, which functioned throughout the correctional facilities. As such events progressed, the group titled themselves the Spanish Gangster Disciples, though at the time this Northside group had no direct contact with the Southside Spanish Gangster Disciples. The Northside Spanish Gangster Disciples started as a secret set on Clark & Olive, which at the time was controlled by the P.R. Stones street gang. The Northside SGDs then went "public" and moved their operations to Wayne street, near Senn High School. There, the gang occupied a large part of a 16 unit building and financed themselves primarily through the selling of marijuana.

These Northside SGDs became more well known for their high-quality marijuana than their violence, though they were well armed through their strongest affiliates, the Gangster Disciples, especially those from the Cabrini-Green housing projects. Thus, the "Spanish Gangster" Disciples are often referred to as more like "brothers" of the Gangster Disciples whereas other Latin Folks were originally referred to as "first cousins" of the GDN. Drug sales created good relationships with all the Folks in the surrounding areas, including the Simon City Royals, Imperial Gangsters, Harrison Gents, Latin Eagles and Spanish Cobras. In fact it was not strange to see even Latin Kings gang members come through to buy large quantities of marijuana to fund their own operations. At this time the only true enemy of the Northside SGDs were the P.R. Stones street gang.

== Acknowledgment ==
The acknowledgment as a legitimate section and getting placed "on the books" for the Northside SGDs came from the Gangster Disciples and through "Shaky?" around 1985. An official set was established at Rosemont & Broadway where the original members were referred to as the "Original 7". Soon after several smaller sets sprung up including Hayt School and Lakewood & Granville. During the late 1970s when the BGDs and Black Disciples were at odds, the Latino Folks went through a change as well. In 1978 the Black Gangster Disciples came out with a new concept. With strong support to Shaky, the BGDs developed the "Spanish Growth and Development", a sort of mixture of the United Latino Organizations (ULO) and Black Gangster Disciples manifesto. Shaky was a former member of the Milwaukee Kings street gang who was incarcerated at the time. He is primarily credited with getting the support of Larry Hoover, in addition to laying out the concept of the Spanish Growth and Development, which originally included the participation of the Maniac Latin Disciples, Imperial Gangsters, Spanish Cobras, Latin Eagles, and Gangster Two-Six. At this time the Latino Folks organized "As One", primarily under the four founding families and three other families (seven gangs or "families" in total, all other Latin Folks were under one of these larger families). All other "non-registered" members who were "plugged" in the prisons would become known as Spanish Gangster Disciples. This explains the explosive yet unorganized growth throughout the state and country once they were released from prison. However, today only a selection of chapters have actual ties to the Spanish Gangster Disciples in Chicago.

== Organization ==
Initially, Spanish Gangster Disciples on both the North and South sides grew at an organized and rapid pace from the late 1980s through the early 1990s. On the Northside, the SGDs set up bases of operation in the Rogers Park, Edgewater, Uptown, Albany Park, and East Jefferson Park neighborhoods. The Northside Spanish Gangster Disciples established some loose ties with the Southside SGDs through the incarceration of "Dee", one of the "Original 7" from the Northside. The Northside like-wise suffered gravely from most of the "Original 7" founding members either being incarcerated or leaving the gang life. Internal power struggles related to money and credibility also had crippling effects to the organization. Dee established bonds with all the Latino families in Cook County during many years of his pre-trial incarceration for multiple murders. He was released and eventually incarcerated in the penitentiary. During this same period, on the streets, the Northside SGDs' leadership became weak and fell into the hands of a former Latin Eagles gang member known as "Demon". Demon began exploiting the various sets of Spanish Gangster Disciples, and squandering money for his personal use as well. The older and loyal Northside sets would not tolerate this, and more events in fighting ensued. To level the ground, Demon vastly increased SGDN numbers for taxation purpose by establishing sets in Chicago suburbs, such as Elgin, Wheeling, and few others. These sets, though not really "hardcore" sets, originally served the purpose to glorify himself as the "Chief", although is a non-existent title in the SGD doctrines. Demon also managed to wage a bloody war against the Latin Eagles street gang, one of the Spanish Gangster Disciples closest allies at one time.

== Assassination of Rudy Rios ==
The Southside suffered from the assassination of Rudy Rios in 1995 and Rudy Guzman became the leader of the Southside section. However, Rudy Guzman was killed shortly after he ascended the gangs leadership. From there, power was divided between two individuals, one who ascended to the title of "Prince" but was incarcerated at the time. This individual then handed power to "Lil'Dee", who was soon after also incarcerated in the early 1990s. Regardless the situation, this left Lil'Dee to control their operations from the inside. During a short period of release, Dee delegated Demon to run the street operations, but to change his tactics and re-establish ties with all Latino Folks allies with the ultimate goal of pursuing political advancement. These such things Dee would do from the inside by maintaining contact throughout the prisons. As fate would have it, Dee and Lil'Dee ended up incarcerated together, and they decided to manifest what was attempted previously. Dee received "blessings" to run the streets with Lil'Dee incarcerated, acting as the true head of the Spanish Gangster Disciples. Unification of all Latin Folks with blessings from the old heads and political advancement was the goal. Upon release, this did not go well with Demon who was power hungry, and had already started conflicts with the Maniac Latin Disciples and Imperial Gangsters on the streets. Operating in MLD territory, Demon attempted to start a "set" on West Hirsch Street, which was a MLD stronghold. This was unacceptable to the established powers, Dee and Lil'Dee. Soon after this, an unsuccessful attempt was made to kill Dee by the suburban Spanish Gangster Disciples loyal to Demon. The older Northsiders and some Southsiders remained loyal to Dee and Lil'Dee. Shortly after this, Lil'Dee was released from prison. On the night that Dee and Lil'Dee were meeting to discuss what action to take against Demon, Lil'Dee was assassinated under mysterious circumstances. Though credit was taken by a rival gang, this was very questionable. Due to lack of a cohesive leadership, the Spanish Gangster Disciples numbers have continued to decline over the years. "Lil'Dee" was rumored the third Spanish Gangster Disciples leader in less than 20 years to get killed. Specifically due to constant feuding with local area gangs such as the Latin Counts and Latin Dragons, police intensity and leadership issues, the South Chicago SGDs' membership and activity has gradually faded and the Almighty Ambrose, another well known Folk Nation gang, took over most their former territory at 87th & Houston by 1997. They are known to have sets in Chicago, mostly in Albany Park, South Chicago, and in suburban Prospect Heights, Wheeling, Palatine, Elgin, South Holland, Highwood and Waukegan.

== See also ==
• Gangster Disciples
