= Gang intelligence unit =

American police anti-gang unit

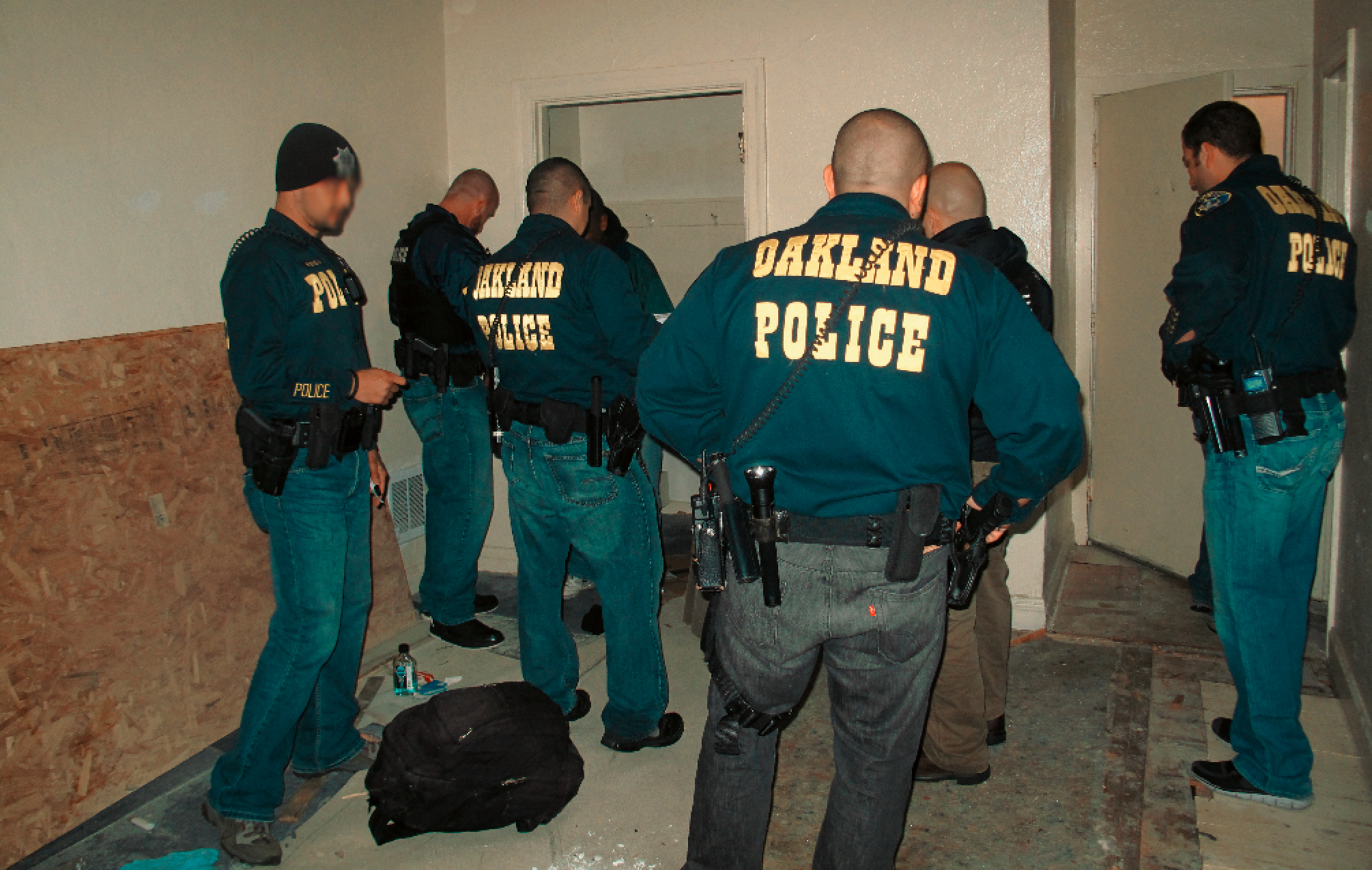
Members of the Oakland Police Department Gang Task Force with California Department of Corrections and Rehabilitation Special Service Unit agents in 2001

A gang intelligence unit (GIU) (also known as an anti-gang unit, gang suppression unit, gang task force, or simply a gang unit, among many other terms) is an American law enforcement unit tasked with investigating, suppressing, and combatting gangs within a geographical location. They exist to provide safety as well as information regarding gang activity in an area, and are also commonly found within correctional facilities. GIUs seek advanced awareness of gang activity as a method to suppress gang violence. Intelligence forms the foundation of GIUs' efforts to suppress gang violence and crime and maintain safety within the community.

== Background ==
In 1967, the Chicago Police Department created a Gang Intelligence Unit (GIU) to respond to Black street gangs. Raids and arrests were conducted, and by the early 1970s Illinois' prisons had a growing Black gang population, including gang leader Jeff Fort, co-founder of the Almighty Black P. Stone Nation. The need for gang intelligence units rose during an increase in gang activity in the 1990s. In 1995, the National Youth Gang Center conducted its first assessment of the national gang problem, and concluded that out of the 3,440 reporting agencies, 2,007 reported an issue with youth gangs. The survey counted a total of 23,388 youth gangs and 664,906 gang members, and concluded that many gangs were growing in size. Further studies by the Denver Youth Study and the Rochester Youth Development Study determined that consistent conclusions existed between gang membership and crime, and that being in a gang increases the level of delinquent and criminal behavior as well as violent offending. These findings prompted the formation of gang units within police departments, as many began to realize that gangs should be treated differently than other groups of criminal offenders. However, by the new millennium, the number of GIUs in the country was a fraction of what it was in the early 1990s. In 1993, 76% of all major police departments implemented a GIU, while by 2000, only 48% of all large departments had a GIU. Furthermore, one “unit” was at this time defined as “a separate special unit with one or more full-time employees,” indicating that some departments only employed one single individual tasked with gang intelligence.

== Functions and duties ==
The duties of a GIU include training law enforcement officers in recognizing gang activity as well as responding appropriately to that activity. The unit also promotes intelligence sharing among agencies with limited information, and allows them to prioritize their law enforcement activities as well as address trends of gang behavior. In correctional facilities, GIUs provide staff safety and prevent violence against other inmates, the public, and rival gangs. GIUs are also instrumental in identifying active gang members, developing confidential informants, and conducting interviews with other inmates in order to disrupt gang activity.

Gang intelligence units assist the administration of correctional facilities in planning, formulating, and implementing strategies and policies related to gang management. This allows for administrators to make informed strategic decisions, allocate resources, and request funds to ensure the safety and security of the facilities. In the past, GIUs have been instrumental in thwarting violent plots to injure or kill other inmates or corrections faculty as well as gangs’ planned criminal activity within the community. They have also been used to gather information on active or recently inactive gang members, leaders, or associates and developing confidential informants. This, in turn, can lead to the confiscation of weapons and contraband.

GIUs, particularly those within correctional facilities, utilize both tactical and strategic intelligence processes. Tactical intelligence may be used for arrests, imprisonment, lockdowns of facilities, transferring an inmate, and conducting searches. Conversely, strategic intelligence supports long-term planning, identification of emerging problems such as new gangs or membership, and following trends and patterns of gang behavior. GIUs will often follow the processes of the traditional intelligence cycle in order to respond to gang activity in an area. GIUs seek to promote staff safety, violence prevention, crime solving, and the development of information sources.

General principles that are critical to operating a successful GIU include: committed leadership; commitment of participating agencies, policymakers, leadership, and team members; a clear mission; frequent and ongoing communication; attentive direction; evaluation; refinements and self-improvement; and sustainability of finances and personnel. A comprehensive data collection plan is also essential to GIUs, as is a definition that law enforcement can use to effectively identify gang activity. The development of indicators for gang activity will greatly assist the GIU in developing a database of gang members and associates. Sharing this information with other levels of law enforcement will also serve to decrease redundancy and overlap of gang information within a particular area.

== Challenges ==
GIUs also face several challenges with curbing gang activity. Distinguishing between “gang-related” crime and “gang-motivated” crime can be difficult, though it is an important distinction for GIUs to make. However, a lack of historic data on gang activity can compound the difficulties GIUs already face. The mobility and ease of communication among gang members also presents challenges for these units, and gangs are constantly evolving in response to the actions of law enforcement.

Due to the challenges law enforcement agencies face in addressing gang activity on their own, GIUs promote collaboration and sharing of intelligence to combat gang activity and work with other agencies to dismantle larger gang networks. This sharing of intelligence remains a vital component to the operations of a GIU within correctional facilities, where the collaboration is sometimes referred to as police/corrections partnerships, as well as among law enforcement agencies. Intelligence sharing also helps to adequately train staff to respond to the gangs’ modus operandi, which can change as a result of new law enforcement policies or operations. Officers, therefore, must possess strong communication and analytic skills as well as a working knowledge of gangs and how they operate both within and outside of a correctional facility. They must also be skilled at forming liaisons with other agencies, interviewing gang members and inmates, sharing relevant information with staff and keeping a proper chain of command, and advising parole staff of which active gang members may pose a threat.

Community Oriented Policing (COP) is a strategy that GIUs use to address challenges with handling gang activity. In this strategy, officers will make informal contacts with the members of a community to address the community’s major problems and issues in anticipation of acquiring new sources of information (informants). By interacting frequently with the public, officers are notified of key concerns and can implement problem-solving techniques more easily.

== Gang databases ==
In the United States, the New York City Police Department maintains a gang database. The state of California has an electronically generated statewide database called "CalGang" administered by the state attorney general. To improve Gang intelligence, police officers have came up with a mechanism that ostensibly distinguishes "gang-related" crime and "gang-motivated" crime . This system provides a time-oriented form of Gang intelligence, that plausibly enhances officers' safety and identifies and tracks gang members within their community. These databases record information about individuals considered to be at risk for a crime or people suspected for past crimes.

== Criticisms ==
Opponents of gang policing methods claim that they encourage racial profiling and are not justified by the magnitude of gang activity. In 2013, the NYPD identified 264 gang-motivated crimes and transferred at least 300 officers to its Gang Division. Additionally, between January 2014 and February 2018, 99% of individuals added to the NYPD gang database were nonwhite.

== See also ==
- Community Resources Against Street Hoodlums
- Gang injunction
- Gangs in the United States
- List of gangs in the United States
- National Gang Intelligence Center
- War on Gangs
