= War on gangs =

United States movement to reduce gang-related activity

In the United States, the war on gangs is a national movement to reduce gang-related activity, gang violence, and gang drug involvement on the local, state, and federal level. The war on gangs is a multi-lateral approach, as federal agencies seek to disrupt the cycle of violence through intervention with state police and social workers.

== History ==
Historically, gangs surfaced in the United States as early as the 1820s, mainly in New York. Gang activity was still considered criminal, however, when drugs were made illegal in 1912 with the First International Opium Convention, gang activity and drug trafficking increased. The United States saw a major increase in gangs during the 1970s and 1980s, due to population growth and the demand for drugs. In 1991, it was estimated that there were 774,000 active gang members in the United States.

== Federal level ==
Although many gang enforcement and policing tactics are carried out on a state-by-state basis, there are federal programs that aim to address the war on gangs. National agencies, like the FBI, Immigration and Customs Enforcement (ICE), United States Marshals Service and the Bureau of Alcohol, Tobacco, Firearms, and Explosives, have enacted programs that target gangs and gang related activities at the federal level.

== State level ==
The criminalization of those associated with such terminology falls solely upon the state magistrate, while the policing involves a cohesive effort by local, state, and federal authorities. The policing tactics implemented and aimed to disrupt, deter, and eliminate criminal street gang activity naturally varies from city to city and state to state depending on the size of the problem as well as legislation. However, the advancement of counterinsurgency technologies and strategies proven effective in militarized zones such as Iraq and Afghanistan has provided authorities with new ways to fight the "war on gangs" in America. Statistical analysis in conjunction with advanced military software can now provide lawmaking authorities with the type of information that maps connections between gang activities, individual suspects, their social circles, family ties, and neighborhood connections. Authorities now have the tools to deconstruct the culture of ‘criminal street gangs’ by not only identifying their territorial boundaries but criminal industries, politics affiliates both in and out of the penitentiary, gang code and ethics, as well as illegal activities.

Beyond the push for a national model providing a tactical framework outlining the methodologies behind the policing strategies of: prevention, intervention, intelligence, and suppression of criminal street gang activity, there is yet another arena where the “War on Gangs” continues to be fought, the political arena. Organized criminal street gangs such as 18th Street are boasting over 65,000 members and are believed to be operating in over 120 U.S. cities, 37 states, in addition to being considered an international crime organization linked to corrupt political insurgency. The Gangster Disciples is an organization with over 30,000 members in 35 states, employing themselves not only in drug trade but sponsoring political candidates, infiltrating police and private security agencies, and sponsoring protest marches.

== Local and community level ==
Researchers have attempted to understand the theoretical implications for participation in gang activity. Many of them looked into the reasons why people join gangs. The most common reasons examined among gang researchers include factors such as socioeconomic status, peer-to-peer and parent-to-child relationships, and discrimination. For example, in 2007, California State University-Northridge professor Kay Kei-Ho Pih and three other university professors conducted a study examining the purpose of capital (drug trafficking) among Latino and Taiwanese gangs. Their findings showed that the Latino gang members were raised in poor neighborhoods, wanted to make quick and easy money from selling drugs, and did not receive support from their parents about their academic endeavors which led them to drop out of school or complete a GED. The Taiwanese triad members, on the other hand, came from higher socioeconomic statuses, prioritized their education getting undergrad and graduate degrees, and sold drugs for recreation purposes. However, Hua-Lun Huang argues that gangs such as the Chinese Triads and the Mexican Mafia could also form because of extremist ideology and political connections to government outside of the United States. In 2002, the Routine activity theory was used by California State University, Long Beach criminal justice professor, John Z. Wang in his case study about eight bank robberies in Houston, Texas, which states that crimes committed by gangs are influenced by three factors:

- Motivated offenders
- The availability of suitable targets
- The absence of capable guardians

=== Alternative approaches ===
Several scholars suggest that alternative methods should be implemented to fight against the war on gangs including the development of community-based outreach programs instead of continuing to arrest potential gang members. For example, in 1998, Westminster Police Department director Douglas Kent and Claremont University professor, George Felkenes conducted a cross-sectional study on the cultural reasons why Vietnamese youth in Southern California join and participate in gang activity by interviewing over 250 Vietnamese youth and parents. Felkenes and Kent concluded their study with recommendations on how to initiate gang prevention programs:

- They are necessary and should be carefully planned.
- They must focus on minority youth rather than the general public.
- They should make the youth population view gangs in a negative light.
- They should teach them how to cope with gangs in residential areas by avoiding their influence.

In addition, University of Illinois-Urbana Champaign criminologist, Jun Sung Hong in his 2010 study about the Bronfenbrenner ecological approach to understanding Vietnamese gangs in America states that “after-school programs and activities for youths, such as sports or job training opportunities might enhance pro-social behavior and reduce motivation to join a gang.” He also argues that professional organizations and practitioners should also educate government officials about the correlation between social conditions and the negative outcomes

== See also ==
- Gang injunction
- Gang intelligence unit
- Gangbuster Bill
- Gangs in the United States
- List of gangs in the United States
- National Gang Intelligence Center
