= Flyboy =

Flyboys or Flyboy may refer to

- Airmen

Flyboys or Flyboy

- Flyboys: A True Story of Courage, 2003 book
- Flyboys (film), 2006 film
- The Flyboys (film), 2008 film
- Several characters in Maximum Ride, see List of characters in Maximum Ride
- Flyboys (band), punk rock band

Fly Boy or Fly Boys

- Smith's Fly Boys, paramilitary group formed during the 1741 New York slave revolt
- Fly Boy, a song from the album I Need Mine
- Fly Boy, In the Sky, a spinoff manga of Banana Fish
- Fly Boy, an album by Crown J
- "Fly Boy", a single by John Wesley (guitarist)

FlyBoy or FlyBoys

- flyboy, an in-universe nickname for the fictional character Silverbolt (Beast Wars)

== See also ==
- The Boy Who Could Fly
