= David Barksdale =

American gang member (1947–1974)

- Barksdale, c. late 1960s
- Born: Donise David Barksdale; May 24, 1947; Sallis, Mississippi, U.S.
- Died: September 2, 1974 (aged 27); Chicago, Illinois, U.S.
- Resting place: Restvale Cemetery, Alsip, Illinois, U.S.
- Other names: King David; David Jones
- Known for: Street gang leader
- Spouse: Yvonne Yarber
- Children: 3

Donise David Barksdale (May 24, 1947 – September 2, 1974), also known as King David, was an American gangster and activist from Chicago. He was the founder of the Black Disciples. He and Larry Hoover (leader of the Gangster Disciples) decided to merge and create the Black Gangster Disciple Nation.

== Biography ==
Born Donise David Barksdale in Sallis, Mississippi, to parents Virginia and Charlie Barksdale, he was the tenth of 13 children. His family moved to Chicago in 1957.

In 1963, Barksdale established the Devil's Disciples street gang. By 1966, his gang, having absorbed several weaker organizations into its ranks, was referred to as the Black Disciple Nation. Tensions grew between the Black Disciples and other gangs including the Black Stone Rangers.

Barksdale eventually grew sick of the bloodshed and proposed a merger with Larry Hoover, founder of the Supreme Gangsters, in 1973. Hoover accepted, and the Black Gangster Disciple Nation was born. The Black Gangster Disciple Nation used a six-pointed star (the Star of David) to represent themselves as a way to pay respect to Barksdale.

Over the course of his life, Barksdale was arrested 25 times but only served short jail sentences and was never convicted of a serious crime. On several occasions when he was arrested, he used the alias "David Jones".

== Death and legacy ==
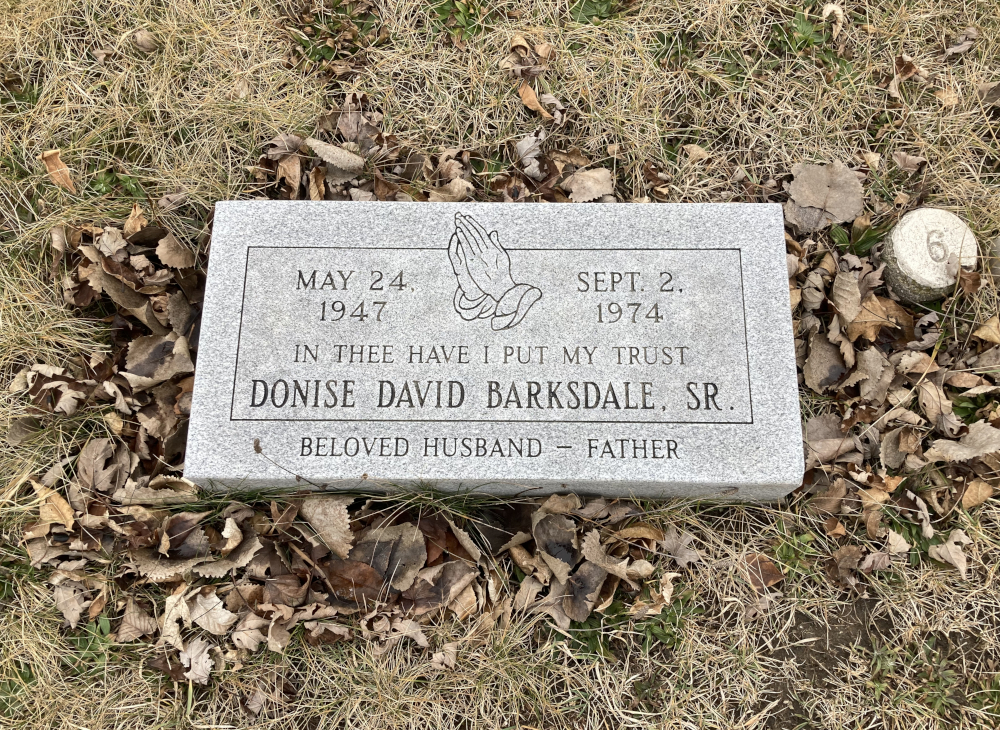
Barksdale's grave at Restvale Cemetery

On September 2, 1974, Barksdale died from kidney failure related to bullet wounds from a June 1970 assassination attempt by members of the Black P. Stone Rangers armed with M14 rifles outside of a bar Barksdale was frequenting with Larry Hoover on 848 West 69th Street. The botched hit ended a truce that was in place at the time between the Rangers and the Disciples. Barksdale was buried at Restvale Cemetery in Alsip, Illinois. He was survived by his three children, David, Melinda, and Ronnie Barksdale, and a wife, Yvonne Barksdale (née Yarber), who would pass away three years later on June 24, 1978.

A birthday picnic for Barksdale is held every year on Chicago's South Side. In 2008, there was a parade that was sponsored and supported by the Black Disciples organization, and in a controversial move, registered by the Chicago City Council for the Saturday of Memorial Day Weekend. The parade was criticized by the Fraternal Order of Police, and officers administering the event were forewarned about potential gang violence.
