= Mickey Cobras =

Street gang based in Chicago, Illinois, United States

Mickey Cobra Nation
- Founded: 1954
- Named after: Henry "Mickey" Cogwell (1945–1977)
- Founding location: North Lawndale, Chicago, Illinois, U.S.
- Years active: 1954–1966 (Egyptian King Cobras); 1966–1977 (Cobra); 1977–present (Mickey Cobras)
- Territory: Chicago, IL, Midwestern United States
- Ethnicity: African American
- Activities: Drug trafficking; robbery; extortion; murder
- Allies: People Nation, Chicago Outfit
- Rivals: Folk Nation, Gangster Disciples, Black Disciples

The Mickey Cobras are a gang based in Chicago and affiliated with People Nation. The gang is considered stable, and its colors are green, black, and red. Factions of the gang are being established throughout the Midwest.

On April 5, 2005, US Attorney Patrick J. Fitzgerald described The Mickey Cobras (few in numbers compared to other parties with similar power) as one of several "super-gangs" that constitute a sizable portion.

Some of their rivals would be Gangster Disciples, Black Disciples and sometimes other People affiliates.

== History ==
=== "Egyptian Cobras" ===
The Egyptian Cobras formed in the year 1954 on Chicago's West Side. The founder of the Egyptian Cobras was James Cogwell. During the mid-1950s the Egyptian Cobras fought heavily with a gang called the 14th Street Clovers. The 14th Street Clovers were the gang that later became the Vice Lords in the late 1950s.

After several members of the 14th Street Clovers were incarcerated by 1957, the Egyptian Cobras had less competition. While incarcerated in the St. Charles Reformatory for Boys, the Clovers organized and became the Vice Lords. When the Vice Lords returned to Lawndale in the year 1958, they soon swelled into a force to be reckoned with. The Vice Lords were very aggressive and the dominant gang in Lawndale. By 1960 the Egyptian Cobras sought better opportunities on the South Side of Chicago. They relocated to the Woodlawn community.

Cogwell led the Egyptian King Cobras as they gained a foothold and reputation in Chicago. In 1966 the Cobras new leader Henry (Mickey) Cogwell held second highest position in the Main 21 alliance, comprising the leaders of different gangs within the Black P. Stone Nation (BPSN). The Cobras and the Black P. Stone Nation allied against the Disciple Alliance and later the Gangster Nation. The Egyptian Cobras then changed their name to the Cobras Stones in 1966.

=== "Mickey Cobras Gang" ===
Mickey Cogwell and the Cobras policed the police in their communities, receiving government grants to feed kids breakfast in the Fuller Park area before public schools offered meals - the template for school free lunch programs all over America - and worked as an organizer for a South Side union. In 1970, the commander of the Gang Intelligence Unit for the Chicago Police Department portrayed Cogwell as the link between gangs and organized crime, particularly the Chicago Outfit.

On February 25, 1977, Mickey Cogwell was assassinated by Jeff Fort because he did not want to be an El Rukn and his followers changed their organization's name again in late '70s or early '80s, becoming the Mickey Cobras in his honor. The Mickey Cobras are mainly in Chicago and surrounding suburbs: their neighborhood is in the area around Fuller Park and the Austin neighborhood on the West Side.

== Involvement in crime ==
The gang has been involved in many drug related criminal activities as well as criminal activities that surround the gang lifestyle such as homicide, extortion and robbery.

=== Cornell Green case ===
Cornell Green was the second-highest ranked "king" in the Mickey Cobras street gang. Federal agents in the United States wanted Green to cooperate, and reports are falsely accusing him of doing so, although he refused. He was sentenced in September 2001 to 30 years in prison for the operation of a large-scale heroin operation on the South side of Chicago. Green was among 15 people who were prosecuted as part of this drug ring.

Some of the other members prosecuted involved:

- Robert Thomas, aged 30, was the only one of the 15 defendants to go to trial; he received a 30-year sentence.
- Kamorudeen Sowemimo, aged 31, was convicted of being a major heroin supplier to the gang; he was sentenced to 14 years in prison.
- Roderick Parker, who was one of the 15 defendants, had admitted to selling hundreds of the bags on an average day.

Prosecutors stated that the drug trafficking operation run by Green used street sellers with cell phones to keep customers posted on their changing locations. Between 1993 and early 2001 it was said that the gang had sold hundreds of "dime" bags (2/10 to 3/10 of a gram) for $10 per bag, and that Green made over $100,000 a week in profit from his drug sales. After Green and the others were indicted in May, Green had many assets that he owned including a house, furnished with hand carved Italian furniture and a home theatre, as well as several luxury vehicles and fur coats which he in turn had to give up as part of his plea bargain. The final total in cost of assets lost to the plea bargain is unknown.

== Organizational characteristics ==
Today the Mickey Cobras are known formally as the "Mickey". In their original identity, they were known as the Egyptian King Cobras.

=== Islamic influence ===
The group has come to have a strong Islamic influence. The Mickey Cobras now has its own written constitution and by-laws, which show a strong Islamic influence, just like those of the modern-day BPSN. In the Illinois prison system, it is a part of the People Nation, the collective name of joined gangs under the five-point star banner (Vice Lords, Black P Stone, Latin Kings, Mickey Cobras, Four Corner Hustlers).
