= Female gangs in the United States =

Female gang members in US street gangs operate within either exclusively female gangs or mixed-gender gangs. Gangs that allow female recruits include all-women functioning units, coed gangs, and female auxiliaries to male gangs. Although female gang membership parallels male membership in many ways, female members and gangs exist and operate in unique ways. The body of research on female gang membership is much less comprehensive than that of male membership, but researchers like Chesney-Lind and Hagedorn are advocating that this topic be studied more extensively and in its own right.

== History ==
In her book on women in gang culture, Taylor claims that historians have documented female gang membership and all-female gangs dating back to the early twentieth century, but traditionally limited their studies to how such gangs relate to existing male versions. Due to this, researchers like Taylor began drawing attention to women in gang culture and argued that the topic deserved to be studied in its own right. Modern research has shifted towards the belief that all-female gangs are not exclusively tied to male gangs, and merit their own study. Chesney-Lind and Hagedorn note that female gang membership does not perfectly mirror male membership, and because of this, interventions aimed towards potential female members must be tailored to women's unique needs and motivations.

== Demographics ==
Although the exact number varies slightly between measurements, the National Gang Center estimates that women and girls account for roughly 10% of all gang members. The National Youth Gang survey found that 39% of gangs report having female members, but this statistic is largely dependent on geographical location. Half of all rural gangs, for example, report female membership while less than a quarter of large city gangs demonstrate such participation, according to the National Gang center. One survey found that 2% of all gangs in the US contain only female members. Eghigian and Kirby (as cited by Law teacher) list 12–13 as the average age of girl inductees.

While both female and male gang members usually join the gang during adolescence, female members are more likely to join during early adolescence.

== Types of involvement ==
Female gang members can function in one of three capacities, as theorized and defined by Walter Miller: independently functioning units, coed gangs, and female auxiliaries to male gangs. Independently functioning units are all-female gangs that operate under their own gang colors and name, without oversight from existing male gangs. Coed gangs possess both male and female members. Most leadership positions are held by men, although Taylor notes that positions and power held by female members varies from gang to gang, and are often dependent on the gang's structure, most notably whether or not it operates for profit. Female auxiliary gangs adopt the symbols of and modify the name of an existing male gang, but operate semi-autonomously. They act in the interests of the male gang, but control member initiation and internal affairs of the group. In a study by Tara E. Sutton on the lives of female gang members, there is significant research that supports the idea that women face similar challenges within gangs however, female gang members also face issues of sexualization within their own groups.

== Crime and violence ==
Female gang members have greater delinquency rates than female and male non-members, according to Bjerregaard and Smith. Despite this, statistics show that male members commit more crime than women and that the acts tend to be more violent, and Peterson found that women in majority male gangs exhibit greater delinquency than female members of other gangs. Female gang members were incarcerated most often for drug-related activities (use and selling), domestic issues, and petty theft/larceny. Joe and Chesney-Lind's research amongst female gang members found that women are less likely to become involved in typical gang-violence, although willingness to support a fellow member in a fight was a necessary trait of a good gang member. Miller found that when women do engage in violence, they tend to avoid weapons like guns and instead prefer fists or knives.

== Motives ==
Female and male recruits often share similar motivations for joining a gang. Hagedorn found that gangs are almost exclusively found in low socioeconomic neighborhoods, especially those occupied by ethnic minorities. Most young adults in such areas face poor job prospects, and often the only sources of employment are low-paying and require minimum skills. Survey responses from Hawaiian gang members indicated that youth may find that illegal activities associated with some gangs are the easiest and most profitable sources of income. Furthermore, the research also implied that hopelessness and boredom stemming from a dearth of opportunities provide incentives to become part of a social unit that faces a similar future. A gang can become a surrogate family for a child whose parents must work long hours at a low-wage job to be able to provide for the family. Many gang members in the Hawaiian study and Campbell's study reported fleeing to gangs as a source of protection from dangerous neighborhoods or abusive households. Female gang members are especially likely to grow up in families where they are victims of sexual abuse, and they remove themselves from such situations by living with the gang; in fact, one study found that approximately half of all female gang members had suffered some form of sexual abuse, and that two-thirds of those attacks occurred in the context of the family. Despite the unstable home lives of many female gang members, a study conducted by Miller demonstrated that girls with family members (typically brothers or cousins) involved in gang activity were much more likely to join themselves. Campbell also posits that girls may join gangs in order to reject "various aspects of membership of three interlocking social identities: class, race, and gender." According to this theory, female gang members are not necessarily united by attributes they assign themselves, such as social deviance and "toughness", but instead join by berating behaviors and characteristics of outside groups, such as the passive role assumed by other poor women in their community.

== Social Control Theory ==
Many consistencies between male and female members are apparent within their motives. as previously mentioned the motivation for most female gang members is a sense of security within the gang. Theories such as social control theory support this. Social control theory, or social control theory of crime was developed by Travis Hirschi in 1969 to describe the psychological motivation behind crime and how the individual committing the crime is "bonded" to society. Hirschis idea of social bonds and delinquency, certifies that the lack of safety in children's neighborhoods, schools, and home can lead to delinquency. In particular, there is an emphasis on the effects of a poor home life on the development of a adolescent girl and their bond to leaving that setting for a seemingly more promising one such as a gang. The social control theory associated with female gang members can also attribute to the types of gang related crime they are involved with.

== Sexuality ==
Many modern researchers, such as Joe and Chesney-Lind, found that early work on female gang members typically describes them as promiscuous, sexually loose young women. However, when female gang members were interviewed by Campbell about their sexual activity, having multiple partners was viewed in a highly negative fashion, and Valdez found that women from other gangs were often referred to as "hoodrats" and "hos", both derogative terms for women thought to be sleeping around. Campbell's research found that sex with long-term partners was viewed as acceptable, but casual hookups were not. Burris-Kitchen reported that members who were "sexed-in" as part of gang initiation were thereafter viewed with lower respect than those that were "jumped-in" or beaten, even when promised they would become full-fledged members. Furthermore, Miller found that sexed-in members face greater risks of sexual exploitation and abuse by fellow male members, and Moore and Hagedorn's research found that sexual promiscuity and heavy drug and alcohol use at social gatherings is often viewed as license for such abuse.

== Leaving the gang ==
In Carlie's research, female gang members who chose to leave gang life did so for many of the same reasons men did, including growing older, marriage, and/or getting a steady and legal job. However, according to the research of Moore and Hagedorn, when a female gang member has a child, she is much more likely to invest the time and resources necessary to raise it than her male counterpart is. Campbell found that although not all gangs require members with children to leave, it is often considered unacceptable for mothers to participate in certain elements of gang life and as a result, some choose to leave the gang entirely. These factors may contribute to Thronberry's finding that women tend to remain in gangs for less time than men do. This theory also is supported by the idea that leaving the gang for maternal factors is seen as more acceptable than if the male counterpart was to leave for paternal duties. It is also important to draw attention to how "exit theory" plays a role in leaving a gang for motherhood. In this case, motherhood would support exit theory, the former member no longer resonates with the ideologies held by a gang and chooses to distance themselves from that lifestyle. However, the previous community being such a large part of a formative period, the emotional cognitivity may play into ones consistent affiliation even during motherhood, potentially perpetuating the cycle.
