= Black Disciples =

Street gang based in Chicago, IL

- Founded: 1966; 60 years ago
- Founded by: David Barksdale
- Founding location: Chicago, Illinois, U.S.
- Years active: 1966–present
- Territory: Chicago, Illinois and surrounding suburbs; Wisconsin; Minnesota; Tennessee; Texas; Georgia; Alabama; Mississippi; Michigan; New York; and other states in the US
- Ethnicity: African-American
- Membership: 15,000
- Criminal activities: Arms trafficking, burglary, extortion, drug trafficking, illegal gambling, kidnapping, money laundering, murder, racketeering, robbery, theft
- Rivals: Gangster Disciples (conflict); Vice Lords; Black P. Stones; Mickey Cobras
- Notable members: Chief Keef; Lil Durk; Lil Reese; King Von; Robert Sandifer

The Black Disciples (often abbreviated as the BD's) is an African American street gang that originated in Chicago, Illinois.

== History ==
In 1958, a group of pre-teens and teenagers from the Hyde Park, Englewood, and Kenwood areas of Chicago formed an organization known as the "Devil's Disciples". The founding members included David Barksdale (1947–1974), Richard Strong, Mingo Shread, Prince Old Timer, Kilroy, Leonard Longstreet, and Night Walker, among others. By the beginning of 1961, David Barksdale, also known as "King David," took sole leadership of the Devil’s Disciples, and appointed different members to oversee various areas within the neighborhoods.

Barksdale's goal was to claim small gangs around the area, and turn them into factions of the Disciples. In 1966, in order to help increase recruitment and counteract threats from other gangs, David Barksdale created the "Black Disciples Nation," which helped boost recruitment numbers into the thousands.

In 1969, Larry Hoover, the leader of the rival gang Supreme Gangsters agreed to a merger with Barksdale to create a unified gang called the "Black Gangster Disciples Nation."

Soon after the alliance was formed, Larry Hoover and one member were charged and convicted for the murder of another member, and both received a life sentence in prison. This left Barksdale in charge of the gang, until he later died due to kidney complications on September 2, 1974.

After Barksdale's death, ideological differences led to the creation of two rival distinct factions: the “Gangster Disciples” and the "Black Disciples".

A member named Mickey Bull took over the Black Disciples, and made peace with the Gangster Disciples. Bull's leadership brought about a temporary lull in the violence, until his murder by the Gangster Disciples in August 1991. In response, three Gangster Disciples were killed by the Black Disciples on August 7, 1991. This would lead to a intensity in the rivalry between 1991 and 1994 until gang leader Marvell Thompson's leadership led to an ease of tension.

== Murder of Yummy ==
In 1994, 11-year-old member Robert "Yummy" Sandifer shot and killed a 14-year-old female pedestrian, Shavon Dean, with a 9mm semiautomatic pistol by mistake.

The gang leader sent out teenaged brothers Derrick and Cragg Hardaway to get rid of Yummy. The brothers lured Yummy into an underpass, and shot him twice in the back of his head. The two were later convicted of murder.

This incident brought unwanted local and national news attention to the Black Disciples, despite efforts to cover up the gang's involvement.

== Gang structure ==
In 1974, the Black Disciples had over 300 sets, with around 30 to 40 members in each set.

== See also ==
- Gangs in Chicago
- Folk Nation
