= Latin Counts =

American street gang

- Founded: 1955; 71 years ago
- Named after: Polish Counts gang
- Founding location: Pilsen, Chicago, Illinois, United States
- Territory: South Side, Chicago; Southwest Detroit, Lincoln Park and Ecorse, Michigan
- Ethnicity: Mexican-American
- Leaders: Isidro Garza, Victor Vasquez, Benjamin Beightol
- Activities: Drug activity, racketeering, murder
- Allies: Vice Lords, Latin Brothers, Spanish Lords, People Nation
- Rivals: Sureños, 12st Players, Almighty Bishops, 4GMz, SVLz, Latin Kings, Two Six, 22Boys, Almighty Ambrose, La Raza, Satan Disciples, Krazy Getdown Boys, Imperial Gangsters, Maniac Latin Disciples, Spanish Gangster Disciples, Insane Deuces, Folk Nation

The Latin Counts is a Latino street gang based in Chicago, Illinois with a significant branch in Detroit, Michigan. It is a member of the People Nation alliance.

== History ==
The gang was founded in 1955 by Tejano youth who had just arrived to the Pilsen neighborhood of Chicago. The original gang members were all related to one another. They named their gang the Texans in homage to the state they originally lived in. The name was changed two years later to Sons of Mexico City to better reflect their ethnic heritage. The name was changed again in 1959 to Latin Counts, inspired by the Polish Counts gang that operated in the nearby Back of the Yards community. During the 1960s, the Counts came into conflict with other gangs in the Pilsen area such as the Latin Kings, the Satan Disciples and Ambrose. In 1970, a faction broke off from the gang to be named the Bishops, who retained good relations with the Counts due to their sharing of the same bloodlines. Their alliance, known as the Bishop Count Nation, would falter in the 1990s.

In 1978, the Counts were invited to join the People Nation, a gang alliance formed in the Pontiac Correctional Center. This enabled the Counts to enter a truce with the allied Latin Kings, but street-level conflict continued between the two gangs until the 1980s. Starting in 1980, the Counts began to expand their operations to the South Chicago and South Deering neighborhoods, and in the mid-1980s they expanded to Cicero, Illinois and Southwest Detroit. In 1991, a full-scale shooting war erupted with the Latin Kings over turf in Cicero that pitted all Counts and Kings against each other nationwide.

== Insignia ==
The Latin Counts' symbol consists of a depiction of Count Dracula, a knight's helmet, and a sword with five slashes above it. The helmet was inspired by the image on the Knight brand matchbox. Their colors are black and red.

== Territory ==
The Latin Counts gang operates in the Chicago area, including the Pilsen, McKinley Park, Marquette Park, Ashburn, South Chicago, South Deering, Cicero, Bridgeview, and Chicago Heights communities. Its territory has expanded to include Southwest Detroit, Michigan, and the suburbs of Lincoln Park and Ecorse. The gang's presence has been detected in other Michigan cities including Pontiac, Flint and Lansing.

== Activities ==
The Latin Counts' main criminal activity involves drug activity and racketeering. Gang members have also been involved in selling stolen weapons, assaults and murders.

== Leadership ==
Isidro Garza led the gang while incarcerated in the Michigan Department of Corrections, where he was already serving 25-50 years for a 1993 gang-related homicide. He was sentenced in federal court to an additional ten years in prison. In June 2017, gang leader Victor Vasquez was sentenced to 30 years in prison for violating the Racketeer Influenced and Corrupt Organizations Act. Benjamin Beightol, the gang's Minister of Information who disseminated Garza's instructions to lower ranking gang members, pleaded guilty to racketeering charges on January 29, 2018, and faced ten years in prison.
