= People Nation =

American alliance of street gangs

- The five-point star is used as a symbol of the People Nation, along with the five-point crown.
- Founded: 1978; 48 years ago
- Founding location: Chicago, Illinois, U.S.
- Years active: 1978–present
- Territory: Chicago; Canada
- Ethnicity: Any (multiethnic)
- Activities: Drug trafficking, robbery, money laundering and murder
- Rivals: Folk Nation

The People's Nation is an American alliance of street gangs generally associated with the Chicago area. They are rivals of the Folk Nation alliance of gangs.

== Formation ==
In 1978, the Vice Lords, Mickey Cogwell and Jeff Fort (now Black P. Stones) and Latin Kings formed an alliance system of their own, and titled it the "People".

Jeff Fort of El Rukns, Bobby Gore of the Vice Lords, and Gustavo Colon of the Latin Kings were instrumental in the forming of this alliance. Among initial members to the People were the Mickey Cobras (then named the Cobra Stones), Bishops, Spanish Lords, soon after the Gaylords and the Insane South Side Popes.

== List of gangs ==
Gangs that are members of the People Nation alliance regardless of status of activity include the following:

- Almighty Black P. Stone Nation
- Almighty Saints
- Almighty Vice Lord Nation
- Chicago Gaylords
- Four Corner Hustlers
- Latin Counts
- Latin Kings
- Mickey Cobras

== Symbols ==
Gangs demonstrate their particular alignment by "representing" through symbols, colors, graffiti, hand signs, and words. Representing also encompasses physical orientation to the left side of the body. The People Nation Gangs wear all identifiers to the left. An earring in the left, a left pants leg rolled up, and a cap tilted to the left may all indicate affiliation to the alliance.

The People Nation's hand sign is thrown to the left shoulder. The gang members fold their arms in a manner that is pointed to the left. The People Nation alliance in most instances uses a five-pointed star in their gang graffiti.

The five-pointed star has its origins with the Blackstone Rangers/Black P. Stone Ranger Nation, one of the larger street gangs. The alliance's term "five alive, six must die" is in reference to the five-pointed star versus the six-pointed star of their rivals in the Folk Nation alliance. Commonly used by the People Nation alliance are drawings of pitchforks pointed down in disrespect to the Folk Nation alliance.

Certain terms are used by the People Nation alliance, such as "all is well" when greeting each other. The five-pointed star is not the only symbol used by the People Nation. Others include a 3D pyramid, a five-pointed crown, a die with its front-side showing five dots, a crescent moon with its concave side facing to the right and sometimes with a small five-pointed star to the right of that moon symbol.
