= Jeff Fort =

American street gang leader and gangster from Chicago, Illinois

- Born: February 20, 1947 (age 79); Aberdeen, Mississippi, U.S.
- Other names: Angel; Black Prince; Chief Malik; Abdul Malik Ka'bah
- Known for: Co–founder and leader of Black P. Stones; Founder of El Rukn (Chicago)
- Spouse: Diane Fort (née Brown)
- Children: Antonio Fort (1965–1997); Ameena Fort–Matthews; Watkeeta Fort; Tonya Fort
- Status: ADX Florence, Florence, Colorado, U.S.
- Convictions: Murder; Drug trafficking Conspiracy
- Penalty: 168 years' imprisonment

Details
- Date apprehended: September 10, 1986

Jeff Fort (born February 20, 1947), also known as Abdul Malik Ka'bah, is an American gangster and former gang kingpin from Chicago, Illinois.

Fort co-founded the Black P. Stones gang and is the founder of its El Rukn faction. Fort is currently serving a 168-year prison sentence after being convicted of conspiracy and weapons charges in 1987 for plotting to commit attacks inside the U.S. in exchange for weapons and $2.5 million from Libya, ordering a murder in 1981 and a conviction for drug trafficking in 1983.

== Early life ==
Fort was the second of ten children born to John Fort and Annie Bacon; d. 2010 in Aberdeen, Mississippi. He moved with his family to the Woodlawn neighborhood on Chicago's South Side in 1955. He dropped out of Hyde Park High School after the ninth grade.

Fort spent time at Cook County temporary juvenile detention center and at the Illinois State Training School for Boys in St. Charles, where he met Eugene "Bull" Hairston.

== The Blackstone Rangers ==
=== 1959–66 ===
Around 1959, Fort and Hairston formed the Blackstone Rangers gang at St. Charles Juvenile Detention Center. The Blackstone Rangers originated as a small youth gang along Blackstone Avenue in the Woodlawn area, assembled to defend themselves against other gangs in the South Side. Hairston was the gang's leader with Fort as second in command. The Rangers fought rival gangs, especially the Devil's Disciples. During the early 1960s, Fort earned the nickname "Angel" for his ability to solve disputes and form alliances between the Rangers and other gangs.

By the mid 1960s, Fort assembled a coalition of 21 gangs with about 5,000 members. He organized the coalition under a governing body called the "Main 21", composed of 21 gang leaders or "generals". As the Ranger organization grew, it became involved in community and political activism. The gang also received support from a Presbyterian minister, Rev. John Fry, who advised Hairston and Fort how to manage their organization.

In 1967, under Rev. Fry's guidance, Fort obtained a charter from the State of Illinois to form a political organization, Grassroots Independent Voters of Illinois. Fort's organization applied for and received a US$1 million federal grant from the now-defunct Office of Economic Opportunity to fund a program to teach job skills to gang members. The Rangers also received grants and loans from private foundations.

Unlike many gangs, the Blackstone Rangers were not considered outsiders but had been largely accepted by Chicago society, with Jeff Fort even receiving an invitation from President Richard Nixon, following the 1968 election, to attend the 1969 inaugural ball. Fort declined this invitation, sending his "top man" Mickey Cogwell and one of his "generals" in his stead.

== Black P. Stone Nation ==
=== 1966–76 ===
After Hairston was imprisoned in 1966, Fort assumed command of the Rangers. By 1968, he renamed it to the Almighty Black P. Stone Nation or Black P. Stones. The Stones engaged in robberies, extortion, and forced recruitment while also acting to keep order in the South Side. The Stones also gained control of vice in the South Side, demanding protection payments from prostitution operations and drug dealers.

In 1969 the jobs program came under investigation amid accusations that grant money was diverted to criminal activities. Fort was subpoenaed to testify before a Senate committee. Fort introduced himself at the committee hearings and walked out; for this, he was convicted of contempt of Congress.

In 1972, Fort and two others were convicted of misusing federal funds and Fort was sentenced to five years in prison. Fort served two years at the United States Penitentiary, Leavenworth and was paroled in 1976. During his time at Leavenworth, Fort converted to Islam and assumed the name Prince Malik.

== El Rukn ==
=== 1976–86 ===
After his release from prison in 1976, he moved to Milwaukee, Wisconsin and joined the Moorish Science Temple. Fort then renamed the Black P. Stones to the El Rukn Tribe of the Moorish Science Temple, El Rukn being Arabic for "the pillar". In 1978, Fort returned to Chicago. In a coup, he replaced the Stones' 21 generals with five close allies and renamed the Black P. Stone Nation to El Rukn. In early–1977, Fort purchased The Oakwood, an old vacant movie theater located at 3947 South Drexel Ave., as their headquarters, naming it The Fort.

Law enforcement speculated the motive for the conversion was to take advantage of restrictions on law enforcement surveillance over religious organizations. During the 1970s, the gang trafficked in cocaine and heroin.

In 1983, Fort was convicted of drug trafficking charges and sentenced to 13 years in prison. He was sent to the Federal Correctional Institution at Bastrop, Texas. Fort continued to lead El Rukn through daily telephone calls from prison. He ordered members of El Rukn to meet with Libyan officials. The gang agreed to commit terrorist acts in the U.S. in exchange for US$2.5 million.

== 1987 conspiracy and weapons conviction ==
In 1987, Fort was tried and convicted for conspiring with Libya to perform acts of domestic terrorism on behalf of a foreign government. He was sentenced to 80 years' imprisonment, consecutive to his drug trafficking sentence, and transferred to USP Marion (the federal prison in Marion, Illinois). In 1988, Fort was convicted of ordering the 1981 murder of a rival gang leader. He was sentenced to 75 years in prison, to be served consecutively with his conspiracy sentence.

Fort was transferred to ADX Florence supermax prison in Florence, Colorado, in 2006 and remains there as of 2026, being under a no-human-contact order since his arrival.

== Legacy ==
Fort's daughter, Ameena Matthews, became an anti-violence activist (or "violence interrupter") in Chicago with the Al Hafeez Initiative. Matthews was featured in the 2011 documentary film The Interrupters.

== Sources ==
- United States (1988). Organized crime : 25 years after Valachi : hearings before the Permanent Subcommittee on Investigations of the Committee on Governmental Affairs, United States Senate, One Hundredth Congress, second session, April 11, 15, 21, 22, 29, 1988. U.S G.P.O. p. 1157. OCLC 19099088.
- United States (1992). Departments of Commerce, Justice, and State, the Judiciary, and Related Agencies Appropriations Act, 1993. Washington, D.C.: U.S. G.P.O. p. 1071. OCLC 27189912.
- Useem, Bert; Peter Kimball (1991). States of Siege: U.S. Prison Riots, 1971-1986. Oxford University Press. pp. 64–65. ISBN 0-19-505711-2.
