= Gangbuster Bill =

Proposed United States Legislation

The Gangbuster Bill, formally known as the "Gang Deterrence and Community Protection Act of 2005", was a proposed piece of legislation in the U.S. Congress.

== Description ==
Principally sponsored by Representative Randy Forbes, a Republican from Virginia, with a number of co-sponsors, the Gangbuster Bill would have allowed teenage gang members to be tried as adults and have increased the mandatory minimum sentence to ten years for some violent gang-related crimes. The bill passed the House of Representatives 279-144 with mostly Republican support. The bill was widely supported by a number of national law-enforcement organizations, such as the Fraternal Order of Police, the National Association of Police Organizations, and the National Sheriffs' Association. The legislation failed to pass the Senate, in part due to opposition from some African-American and Hispanic-American organizations, such as the National Council of La Raza.

The proposed legislation pursued two principal goals:

- Designate "High Intensity Gang Areas" and authorize funds to combat gang activity in those areas.
- Define gang crime in the federal code and specify punishments for gang-related crimes and other violent crimes.

In 2007 Rep. Forbes reintroduced the legislation, which has currently been referred to the House Committee on the Judiciary.

== Legislative History ==
Congress	Short title	Bill number(s)	Date introduced	Sponsor(s)	# of cosponsors	Latest status
109th Congress	Gang Deterrence and Community Protection Act of 2005	H.R. 1279	March 14, 2005	Randy Forbes (R-VA)	15	Passed House (279-144)
110th Congress	Gang Deterrence and Community Protection Act of 2007	H.R. 880	February 7, 2007	Randy Forbes (R-VA)	18	Died in committee
111th Congress	Gang Deterrence and Community Protection Act of 2009	H.R. 2857	June 12, 2009	Randy Forbes (R-VA)	6	Died in committee
