= Long Bridge Boys =

18th c. gang in New York City

The Long Bridge Boys were one of two early gangs formed in New York that participated in the Conspiracy of 1741. Their name either came from the Coffee House Bridge near the end of Wall Street, or the bridge at the foot of Broad Street over the sewer.

According to the testimony of Adolphus Philipse's slave Cuffee, the Long Bridge Boys controlled the west-side of New York City while the Fly Boys controlled the east. Historian Leopold S. Launitz-Schurer believed the gang was organized by John Hughson and was modeled after the previous Geneva Club and the Freemasons.

== Sources ==
- Burrows, Edwin G.; Wallace, Mike (19 November 1998). Gotham: A History of New York City to 1898. Oxford University Press. ISBN 978-0-19-974120-5.
- Foster, Herbert L. (1990). Ribbin', Jivin', and Playin' the Dozens: The Persistent Dilemma in Our Schools. Herbert Foster. ISBN 978-0-9624847-0-4.
- Horsmanden, Daniel (1971). Davis, Thomas J. (ed.). The New York conspiracy. Boston: Beacon Press. ISBN 978-0-8070-5436-9.
- Launitz-Schurer, Leopold S. (1980). "Slave Resistance in Colonial New York: An Interpretation of Daniel Horsmanden's New York Conspiracy". Phylon. 41 (2). Clark Atlanta University: 137–152. doi:10.2307/274967. JSTOR 274967.
