= New York slave codes =

Aspect of law in the colony of New York

The New York slave codes were a series of slave codes passed in the Province of New York to regulate slavery. The first slave code was passed in 1702, with major expansions passing in 1712 and 1730 in response to slave insurrections.

== 1702 slave code ==
On November 27th, 1702, the 'Act for the Regulating of Slaves' was passed by New York's colonial legislature. This act had seven main clauses that:

1. Prevented free people from trading with any enslaved person without the permission of their enslaver, suffering a fine of five pounds and three times the value of anything that was traded.
2. Permitted enslavers to punish the enslaved as they saw fit, without mutilating or killing them.
3. Banned enslaved people from meeting away from their enslavers' property in groups of three or more without their enslavers' authorization. The punishment for breaking this law was up to forty lashes across the back.
4. Banned the enslaved from assaulting free Christian people, with corporal punishment or imprisonment for up to fourteen days as a consequence.
5. Prohibited the lodging or entertainment of enslaved people within someone's property without the written authorization of their enslaver. The punishment was a fee of five pounds for every day that the enslaved person was on the property. The clause also states that the person lodging the enslaved person was liable for reimbursing an enslaver if the enslaved person was killed, harmed, or lost while in their presence.
6. Changed the punishment for small crimes committed by the enslaved so that their enslaver had to pay a fine and the enslaved person received corporal punishment.
7. Banned the testimony of the enslaved, except against other enslaved people.

== Insurrection of 1712 and Expansion of Slave Codes ==
=== 1712 Insurrection ===
On April 6th, 1712, around twenty five (though some sources claim there could have been fifty to one hundred) African Americans gathered at midnight in the East Ward in the northeastern area of New York carrying various weapons like guns, clubs, knives, and hatchets. They set fire to the outhouse of a man named Peter Van Tilburg (Van Tilborough, Vantilbourgh) and waited. When white residents came out to investigate the fire, the group attacked, killing nine and injuring six. Robert Hunter, the Governor of the colony sent a militia to quell the rebellion, but the group had dispersed into the woods by the time the militia arrived. The next day, local militias methodically searched the area and captured almost all of the rebels, though six of them took their own lives before being captured. Of the seventy people that were brought into custody, forty were brought to trial and eighteen were acquitted. Twenty five of the accused were convicted and sentenced to death by various methods. Twenty were hanged, four were burned alive, one of which was burned over a slow fire for eight to ten hours. One of the convicted was starved to death and another was broken on the wheel. As a result of this insurrection, harsher codes were enacted to restrict the autonomy of the enslaved and suppress the possibility of future uprisings.

=== 1712 Slave Code ===
On December 10, 1712, a few months after the events of the 1712 rebellion, a law entitled 'An Act for Preventing Suppressing and Punishing the Conspiracy and Insurrection of Negroes and Other Slaves' was passed by New York's Assembly. This iteration of the law expands upon several of the clauses seen within the 1702 law and set more restrictions upon the lives of enslaved and free African Americans within the colony. The main new clauses within this law:

1. Prohibited any person freed after its passing from owning land.
2. Set an initial and yearly fee for manumitting the enslaved upon enslavers. If the enslaved were manumitted through the will of someone who died, the executors of the will were responsible for paying said fee. If the fee was not paid, the manumission was considered void.
3. Named murder, conspiracy, rape, arson, mutilation, dismemberment and 'mayhem' as crimes that were punishable by death if carried out by an enslaved person against free people.
4. Prohibited enslaved people from owning or using a gun without the authorization of their enslaver. This punishment for breaking this law was no more than twenty lashes upon the back.

== 1730 Slave Code ==
The last of the main slave codes of New York was passed on October 29th, 1730. Entitled 'An Act for the More Effectual Preventing and Punishing the Conspiracy and Insurrection of Negro and Other Slaves', this law arose from perceived mischief that was thought to have come from enslaved people having too much autonomy, and combined the 1702 and 1712 iterations of each respective law while expanding on some of their content. The main changes seen within this iteration of the law:

1. Prohibited the sale of alcohol to enslaved people.
2. Removed the clause prohibiting formerly enslaved people from owning land.
3. Banned enslaved people from using or owning of any kind of weapon without the authorization of their enslaver
4. Repealed the 1702 and 1712 iterations of the law.

== The Abolition of Slavery and Repeal of Slave Codes ==
Throughout the mid to late 1700s, there was a gradual legislative push towards the abolition of slavery within New York and the repeal of slave codes, with the pieces of legislation to begin the abolition of slavery and subsequent slave codes in New York being passed in 1799 and 1817..

=== 1799 Gradual Emancipation Act ===
March 29th, 1799 saw the passage of 'An Act for the Gradual Emancipation of Slavery'. Mainly, this act:

1. Stated that any child born to an enslaved person after the date of July 4^{th}, 1799, would be free, but were obligated to labor in mandatory indentured servitude until the ages of twenty-five and twenty-eight for women and men respectively.
2. Required enslavers to teach any children whose labor they were benefiting from to read.
3. Allowed enslavers to renounce or abandon their rights to any enslaved children. The child would then become the responsibility of the jurisdiction or state that they resided in.

=== 1817 Act ===
On March 31st, 1817, "An Act Relative to Slaves and Servants" was passed by the New York legislature. This law added onto the 1799 gradual emancipation act, stating that all enslaved people who were born before July 4th, 1799 and not covered by the 1799 emancipation act would be freed on July 4th, 1827. Since this law established a specific date in which all enslaved people within the state would be freed, it effectively abolished slavery within New York.
