= Almighty Vice Lord Nation =

Vice Lords
- Founded: 1957; 69 years ago
- Founding location: North Lawndale, Chicago, Illinois, United States
- Years active: 1957–present
- Territory: 28 States, Chicago metropolitan area and Great Lakes region
- Ethnicity: African American
- Membership (est.): 30,000–35,000+
- Activities: Drug sales, robbery, extortion, fraud, money laundering, murder, racketeering
- Allies: Black P. Stones; Bloods; Latin Kings; People Nation; Mickey Cobras
- Rivals: Folk Nation; Gangster Disciples; Simon City Royals; Crips
- Notable members: Polo G; Moneybagg Yo; Freddie Gibbs

The Almighty Vice Lord Nation (Vice Lords for short, abbreviated AVLN) is the second-largest and one of the oldest street and prison gangs in Chicago, Illinois, United States. Its membership is estimated to be between 30,000 and 35,000. It is a founding member of the People Nation multi-gang alliance.

== Origin and growth ==
In 1957, the Vice Lords gang was founded by several African American youths originally from the North Lawndale neighborhood of Chicago. These youths met while incarcerated in the Illinois State Training School for Boys in St. Charles (also known as the St. Charles Juvenile Correctional Facility). At the time, they were led by founding member Edwin "Pepalo" Perry. The name "vice" was chosen when a gang founder looked up the term and found the meaning as "having a tight hold".

As the original Vice Lords group were released from incarceration, they quickly began to recruit other youths from their neighborhood and began engaging in conflicts with other "clubs" from various Chicago neighborhoods. By 1964, they had grown significantly and law enforcement named them as a primary target for their various illegal activities, including robbery, theft, assaults, battery, intimidation, and extortion. They were noted for their violent behavior.

=== CVLN, Inc. ===
In an attempt at softening their public image, a leader of one of the original eight Vice Lord sets changed the gang's name to "Conservative Vice Lords", which came to serve as the foundation of the entire Vice Lord Nation. They developed new logos and advertised themselves as a community outreach group. They went as far as to petition for a community outreach chapter named "Conservative Vice Lord Incorporated". This attempt was successful enough that the group began to receive a large amount of positive publicity from various politicians and community leaders. CVL, Inc. established a number of recreational areas for neighborhood children which were then used as meeting houses after they had closed for the day.

In 1970, two Vice Lord leaders, Alfonso Alfred and Bobby Gore, applied for a $275,000 grant from the Rockefeller Foundation. The Rockefeller Foundation approved the grant. This particular era of the CVL is documented in the 1970 film, Lord Thing, by Chicago filmmaker DeWitt Beall. Those featured in the film include Bobby Gore, Kenneth "Goat" Parks, Eddy "Pepilo" Perry, Don McIlvaine, Leonard Sengali and William Franklin.

At the same time, the gang was successfully consolidating smaller neighborhood gangs (including the Cherokees, the Morphines, the Commanches, the Continental Pimps, the Imperial Chaplains, the Clovers, the Cobras, and the Braves) into the Vice Lord Nation. As a result, their numbers swelled significantly. In spite of the positive press, it was soon discovered that the Vice Lords were still violent criminals. An introduction of narcotics into the Lawndale neighborhood during this time, along with a rapid increase in crimes involving intimidation, extortion, and murders of business owners who refused to pay for "protection" were perpetrated by the gang.

=== Muslim identity adopted (1980s) ===
After public pressure, a federal investigation into CVL, Inc.'s use of the Rockefeller grant money was conducted and as a result, several leaders were arrested and sent to prison. By the early 1980s, Perry and Alfred were dead and Gore was in prison for murder. The younger Vice Lord leadership attempted to conceal the gang's true intentions with another camouflage campaign, this time by adopting Islamic ideologies. By the mid-1990s they had created a large document called Lords of Islam which addressed new rules for the gang. Their headquarters, located near Pulaski and 16th Street, is referred to as the "Holy City".

=== 1990s–present ===
In the 1990s, the VLs, while engaging in the usual activities, became much more sophisticated and expanded into mortgage fraud, credit card fraud, and money laundering. According to the U.S. Department of Justice, the Vice Lords Nation has between approximately 30,000 and 35,000 members operating in 75 cities and 28 states, primarily in the Great Lakes region.

== Symbols ==
Vice Lord street gangs use a variety of symbols to identify themselves, including a top hat and cane, the letters "VL", and a rabbit wearing a bow tie (the Playboy logo) . They also use symbols from other People Nation groups, such as champagne glasses, five-pointed stars, and gloves. Their colors are red, gold, and black. Members often have tattoos below the thumb, serving as both identification and protection for members facing possible jail time.

== Willie Lloyd ==
As a teenager growing up on Chicago's West Side in the 1960s, Willie Lloyd joined the Unknown Vice Lords, a faction based along 16th Street in the Lawndale neighborhood. Lloyd soon became the faction's leader and recruited thousands of followers. Eventually he proclaimed himself "King of Kings" and stated that he was the leader of the entire Vice Lord Nation. However, his tenure was interrupted by a prison term for his part in the murder of a police officer in Iowa.

Lloyd continued to lead the gang on the outside through fellow inmates and prison employees affiliated with the gang. While incarcerated, Lloyd wrote The Amalgamated Order of Lordism, a 61-page manifesto on the Vice Lord command structure in the prisons and on the streets. He was incarcerated in 1971 until his release on parole in 1986, then was back in prison a year later on a weapons conviction until another parole in 1992. When he left prison in 1992, he was picked up by fellow gang members dressed in furs who were driving a convoy of five limousines.

Later in 1992, he was involved in a protracted gang war over control of the Vice Lord Nation, involving kidnapping and the murder of rival members' children. Law enforcement intensified its efforts to remove Lloyd from the street, and from 1994 to 2001, he was again incarcerated for weapons violations.

Lloyd publicly quit the Vice Lords after his release from prison, and became an outspoken critic of gang life. Lloyd attempted to earn a living as a gang mediator, and he became affiliated with a non-profit organization. He was briefly a guest lecturer for a class called "Street Gangs in Chicago" at DePaul University, which was controversial, in part due to field trips in which Lloyd took the students to the West Side.

In August 2003, Lloyd was shot four times in Garfield Park. This was the third murder attempt on Lloyd. Lloyd became paralyzed from the neck down due to injuries from the shooting. Rumors persisted that Lloyd still wanted to collect a "tax" from the Vice Lords as its leader, even though he had supposedly left gang life. Lloyd gave interviews stating that he believed his attackers included some of his former henchmen. Lloyd passed away in June 2015, aged 64.

== See also ==
- People Nation
- Folk Nation
