= Smith's Fly Boys =

Smith's Fly Boys was one of two paramilitary groups formed during the New York Slave Insurrection of 1741 in New York City. Along with the Long Bridge Boys, the participants were accused of arson during the spring of 1741. As a result of the ensuing trials, four whites were hanged, 17 blacks were hanged, and 13 more were burned at the stake.
