= Almighty Black P. Stone Nation =

American street gang founded in Chicago

- Founded: 1959
- Named after: Blackstone Avenue
- Founding location: Woodlawn, Chicago, Illinois, U.S.
- Years active: 1959–present
- Territory: Primarily concentrated in Chicago, some areas of NW Indiana, Michigan, Norfolk, Virginia, Richmond, Virginia and the neighborhood of Rockford Illinois, very populated on the north side of Rockford Illinois with tons of sets that claim "Black P Stone" and parts of Baldwin Village in Los Angeles
- Ethnicity: Any (Predominantly Black Americans)
- Membership: 6,000–8,000+
- Activities: Drug trafficking; extortion; money laundering; murder; robbery
- Allies: People Nation; Bloods; Vice Lords; Four Corner Hustlers; Latin Kings; Chicago Outfit; Libyan Arab Jamahiriya
- Rivals: Folk Nation; Gangster Disciples; Black Disciples; Crips
- Notable members: Jeff Fort; Eugene "Bull" Hairston; G Herbo; Lil Bibby

The Almighty Black P. Stone Nation (often abbreviated as BPS, BPSN, Black Peace Stones, Black P. Stones, Stones, or Moes) is an American street gang founded in Chicago. The gang was originally formed in the late 1950s as the Blackstone Rangers. The organization was co-founded by Eugene Hairston and Jeff Fort. In later years, under Fort's leadership, an Islamic faction of the gang emerged, naming themselves the "El Rukn tribe of the Moorish Science Temple of America" (or simply El Rukn, Arabic for "the pillar" or "the foundation"). They eventually started describing themselves as Orthodox Sunni Muslims. Jeff Fort changed their fort name from El Rukn Moorish Science Mosque, to El Rukn Sunni Masjid al-Malik.

Considered by law enforcement authorities to be Chicago's most powerful and sophisticated street gang, the BPSN finances itself through a wide array of criminal activities and is part of the large Chicago gang alliance known as the People Nation. Under Fort's command, the BPSN assumed an increasingly revolutionary outlook as it became associated with the black nationalism movement, eventually attracting the attention of the Nation of Islam leader Louis Farrakhan, who introduced them to Libyan leader Muammar al-Gaddafi and Nicaragua's Sandinistas. In 1986 four of its members were indicted for conspiring to commit terrorist acts in the United States for the Libyan Government. The verdict marked the first time American citizens had been found guilty of planning terrorist acts for a foreign government in return for money.

== Territory ==
The BPSN originated, and is based, on the South Side of Chicago in the Woodlawn neighborhood. The BPSN had then advanced in the Northwest Indiana communities of Gary, Merrillville, Crown Point, Portage and Elkhart. It has since emerged in other areas, particularly Wheatley Place, South Dallas Texas in the United States.

There is a set in the West-Side Black P Stones in the Los Angeles area called the Jungles and the Bity another area called Crenshaw & Adams. They were founded by OG T Rodgers from Chicago after he moved to Los Angeles. When he was 13 years old he built his set, with 500 or more in membership. They also are affiliated with the Bloods due to the Bloods and the Piru Bloods protecting BPSN in Los Angeles from the Crips when they began in Los Angeles.

== History ==
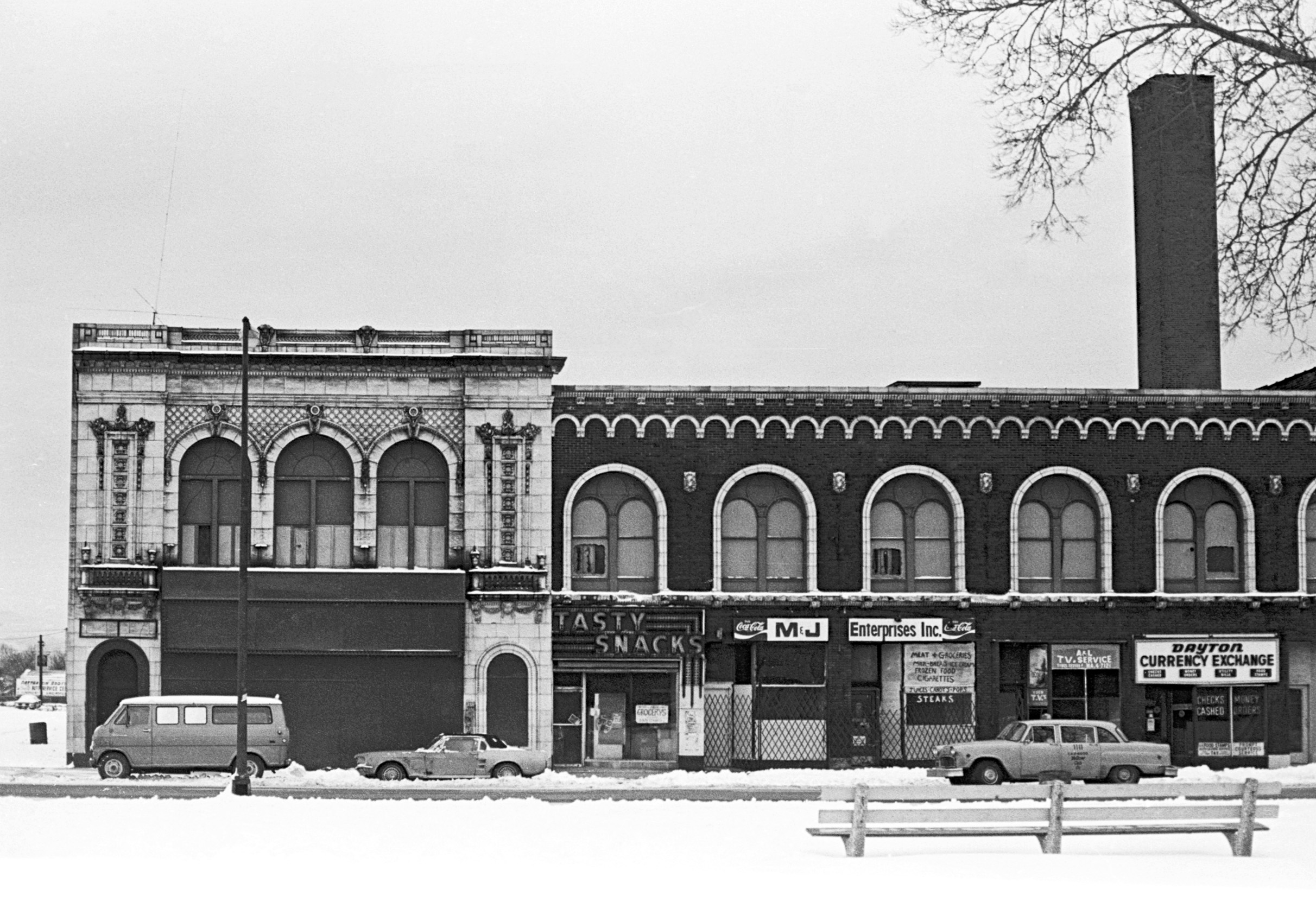
Headquarters in 1978: Vacant theater in 3900 block of South Drexel

The Blackstone Rangers were founded at the St. Charles Institution for Troubled Youth by Jeff Fort and Eugene Hairston as a community organization for black youth in the Woodlawn area of South Chicago. Between 1961 and 1963, they evolved into one of the most dangerous and powerful gangs in Chicago. Fort seized upon the gang's changed mission, renaming it the Black P.(Peace) Stone Nation. He transformed the BPSN into a black nationalistic group, and continued to involve the gang in street crime and drug trafficking. BPSN co-founder Eugene Hairston was incarcerated on drug charges in June 1966 and was eventually murdered in 1988. Fort was arrested for mismanagement of government grants totaling $927,000 from the U.S. Office of Economic Opportunity in March 1972. Fort was released in 1976, but was later re-incarcerated on drug charges in the early 1980s. At the same time he was released from prison, Fort converted to Islam and imbued the BPSN with Islamic overtones, and adopted the name Abdul Malik Ka'bah.

Following meetings during 1986 with Libyan operatives from Colonel Gaddafi's government, Fort was arrested. In 1987, Fort was tried and convicted for conspiring with Libya to perform acts of domestic terrorism. He was sentenced to 80 years imprisonment and transferred to the USP Marion, the federal supermax prison in Marion, Illinois.

In 1988, Fort was also convicted of ordering the 1981 murder of a rival gang leader and was sentenced to 75 years in prison to be served after the completion of his terror conspiracy sentence. While Fort continues to exercise considerable influence over the BPS from prison, the various Black Stones splinter groups suffer from rampant infighting without a clear leader. There are two major groups that have split with the BPSN: The Mickey Cobras were supporters of Mickey Cogwell, a co-founder of BPSN killed by Jeff Fort. The Titanic Stones were supporters of Eugene Hairston who had a falling-out with Fort.
