= My Life My Choice =

U.S. nonprofit organization

My Life My Choice (MLMC), a Boston, Massachusetts-based program of the Justice Resource Institute, is a survivor-led non-profit organization fighting to end commercial sexual exploitation of children. Through their survivor-led model, My Life My Choice provides a continuum of services including survivor mentorship, prevention education, professional training, and advocacy and leadership development. Founded in 2002, My Life My Choice's mission is to harness the strength and power of survivors along with creating a network of allies to fight Commercial sexual exploitation of children My Life My Choice is nationally recognized for its prevention curriculum, which is used to empower and educate youth on recognizing the signs of perpetrators and the dangerous reality of the commercial sex industry. My Life My Choice mentoring services are available for girls ages 12–18 in Eastern Massachusetts and, since the launch of a pilot program in 2014, boys and transgender youth ages 12–18 in the Boston area.

My Life My Choice has been featured in many different media campaigns, including Nicholas Kristof and Sheryl WuDunn's documentary, A Path Appears, with Blake Lively. My Life My Choice works to influence legislature and government action, for example Associate Director Audrey Morrissey worked closely with the Attorney General of Massachusetts, Martha Coakley and the My Life My Choice leadership corps discussed the Justice for Victims of Trafficking Act of 2015 with Congressman Joseph P. Kennedy III.

== History ==
My Life My Choice was co-founded by Lisa Goldblatt Grace LICSW, MPH in 2002 after the death of a 17-year-old girl, Latasha Cannon. Before her death, Cannon was living at a Child Protective Services funded group home and unknown to adults in her life, was being commercially sexually exploited. After Cannon's brutal murder, Boston's leaders came together and discovered that this was not an isolated incident, it was just one of many similar cases My Life My Choice was born out of Cannon's death to combat the commercial sexual exploitation of children. My Life My Choice has grown into a nationally recognized organization in the fight against the commercial sexual exploitation of children.

In 2006, My Life My Choice was recognized as a national model for sex trafficking prevention by the United States Department of Justice. The My Life My Choice curriculum is being used nationwide as a preventative model to combat the commercial sexual exploitation of children. Additionally, in 2009 My Life My Choice became a part of the Justice Resource Institute. The Justice Resource Institute (JRI) is a non-profit organization in Massachusetts that works in partnership with community members "to pursue the social justice inherent in opening doors to opportunity and independence". My Life My Choice is one of the twelve 'Community Based Behavioral Health Services' programs at the Justice Resource Institute. In 2010, My Life My Choice was recognized as one of Root Cause's Social Innovators of the year. The upward growth of My Life My Choice can also be seen in their 2011 and 2014 award of the highly competitive United States Department of Justice "Mentoring for Child Victims of Commercial Sexual Exploitation and Domestic Sex Trafficking Initiative" grant.

== Mission ==
"The mission of My Life My Choice is to prevent the commercial sexual exploitation of adolescents through survivor-led programs that educate and empower youth to find their voice and create a positive life path while working to eliminate the violence and victimization of commercial sexual exploitation. We have a laser focus on strengthening the power, and amplifying the voices, of those who are most vulnerable and of those who have survived exploitation. We are building a network of allies to stand up to the force of the illegal sex industry and create long-lasting social change".

== Structure ==
My Life My Choice uses four main methods to fight back against the commercial sexual exploitation of children: survivor mentorship, education, training and advocacy.

=== Survivor mentorship ===
The survivor mentorship program at My Life My Choice pairs exploited youth or youth that are at high-risk of being exploited with an adult female survivor. The survivor mentorship provides one-on-one support, guidance, tools to become a healthy and successful adult in society, a place of belonging, and a sense of hope for exploited or high risk youth. The survivor mentorship program maintains a long term focus of recovery – always maintaining contact and support for the youth they serve. Anti -trafficking activist and creator of Girls Educational and Mentoring Services Rachel Lloyd has said "My Life My Choice is the gold standard in mentoring programs for commercially sexually exploited and trafficked girls".

=== Prevention education ===
My Life My Choice has a ten-session nationally acclaimed prevention curriculum that is used to educate and empower youth on recognizing the signs of perpetrators and the dangerous reality of the commercial sex industry. The prevention curriculum groups are offered all over the United States in schools, group homes, or other community settings. An example of the My Life My Choice curriculum in use is at the R.I.S.E. House (Residential Intervention for the Sexually Exploited) in Redwood City, California. The curriculum is delivered in ten sessions by trained staff, including at least one licensed clinician and one survivor of commercial sexual exploitation. The goal of the curriculum group sessions is to change the youths perceptions of the commercial sex industry, in addition to building self-esteem and personal empowerment in fighting against commercial sexual exploitation.

=== Professional training ===
My Life My Choice offers elementary and advanced training on the commercial sexual exploitation of children to law enforcement and service providers. Trainings focus on general education about commercial sexual exploitation of children, risk factors of exploitation, techniques for identification of exploitation, and how to support exploited youth and connect them to services. The purpose of training professionals is to increase the identification rate and improve the response of providers to exploited youth.

=== Advocacy and leadership ===
My Life My Choice brings the voices of survivors of sexual exploitation to the forefront in the fight against commercial sexual exploitation of children; collecting and harnessing the resilience of a collective group of survivors and allies to strengthen the message that this crime is unacceptable. My Life My Choice partners with other organizations who are also working to end the commercial sexual exploitation of children, for example the SEEN Coalition and the Massachusetts Attorney General's Anti Trafficking Taskforce. Additionally, My Life My Choice provides opportunities for the youth they mentor to participate in leadership and advocacy roles through the MLMC Leadership Corps. Leadership Corps members engage in a variety of activities including serving on an advisory committee to the SEEN Coalition and the Boston Police Department, meeting with Congressman Joseph P. Kennedy III to discuss the Justice for Victims of Trafficking Act of 2015, and creating materials for My Life My Choice to improve their work.

=== Board ===
My Life My Choice has a board of twelve members who possess knowledge about adolescent development, marketing, legal services, non-profit management, and government. With this knowledge, the board members provide guidance and support to the MLMC senior staff.

== Media coverage ==
=== A Path Appears ===
My Life My Choice was featured in Nicholas Kristof and Sheryl WuDunn's three part PBS documentary, A Path Appears, and with Blake Lively. A Path Appears, Episode 1 sheds a light on the issue of sex trafficking in the United States as well as effective solutions that have been implemented. During Episode 1, Blake Lively and Nicholas Kristof visit My Life My Choice to learn about the work they do and to investigate the sexual exploitation of young girls and women. Blake Lively during this documentary stated, "The most powerful thing is for women not just to be the beneficiaries of the change, but to be agents of it ... My Life My Choice is such a powerful organization because it utilizes survivors".

==== Coverage ====
- Marie Claire –
- US Weekly –
- Elle Magazine –

=== Featured in ===
- The Boston Globe –
- 90.9 WBUR – Boston's NPR News Station –
