= Sex trafficking in the United States =

Sex trafficking in the United States is a form of human trafficking which involves commercial sexual exploitation as it occurs in the United States. Sex trafficking includes the transportation of persons by means of coercion, deception and/or force into exploitative and slavery-like conditions. It is commonly associated with organized crime.

It has been estimated that two-thirds of trafficking victims in the United States are US citizens. Most victims who are foreign-born come into the US legally, on various visas. The United States Department of State estimated that between 15,000 and 50,000 women and girls are trafficked each year into the United States.

The measures against trafficking of women focus on harsher criminal legislation and punishments, and improving international police cooperation. There are vast media campaigns which are designed to be informative to the public, as well as policy makers and potential victims.

== History ==
Ad warning about white slavery

Early American colonists were largely male, and some men decided to rape women to secure a bride

By the 19th century, most of America's cities had a designated, legally protected area of prostitution. The Page Act of 1875 restricted the immigration of Chinese women in reaction to racially charged fears about prostitution, sexually transmitted diseases, and American cultural morality. The Donaldina Cameron House was founded by San Francisco women to help Chinese women forced into sexual slavery.

Increased urbanization and young women entering the workforce led to greater flexibility in courtship without supervision. It is in this changing social sphere that the panic over "white slavery" began. The term "white slavery" was used to refer to white Anglo-American women coerced into prostitution.

Numerous communities appointed vice commissions to investigate the extent of local prostitution, whether prostitutes participated in it willingly or were forced into it and the degree to which it was organized by any cartel-type organizations. The second significant action at the local levels was to close the brothels and the red light districts. From 1910 to 1913, city after city withdrew this tolerance and forced the closing of their brothels. Suffrage activists, especially Harriet Burton Laidlaw and Rose Livingston, worked in New York City's Chinatown and in other cities to rescue young white and Chinese girls from forced prostitution.

In 1910, the US Congress passed the White Slave Traffic Act of 1910 (better known as the Mann Act), which made it a felony to transport women across state borders for the purpose of "prostitution or debauchery, or for any other immoral purpose". Its primary stated intent was to address prostitution, immorality, and human trafficking particularly where it was trafficking for the purposes of prostitution. The Act was believed to have excluded victims who were not young white victims, as women of color were often blamed, arrested, incarcerated.

As more women were being trafficked from foreign countries, the US began passing immigration acts to curtail aliens from entering the country. Several acts such as the Emergency Quota Act of 1921 and Immigration Act of 1924 were passed to prevent emigrants from Europe and Asia from entering the United States. Following the banning of immigrants during the 1920s, human trafficking was not considered a major issue until the 1990s.

The 1921 Convention set new goals for international efforts to stem human trafficking, primarily by giving the anti-trafficking movement further official recognition, as well as a bureaucratic apparatus to research and fight the problem. The Advisory Committee on the Traffic of Women and Children was a permanent advisory committee of the League. Its members were nine countries, and several non-governmental organizations. An important development was the implementation of a system of annual reports of member countries. Member countries formed their own centralized offices to track and report on trafficking of women and children. The advisory committee also worked to expand its research and intervention program beyond the United States and Europe. In 1929, a need to expand into the Near East (Asia Minor), the Middle East and Asia was acknowledged. An international conference of central authorities in Asia was planned for 1937, but no further action was taken during the late 1930s.

== Legislation ==
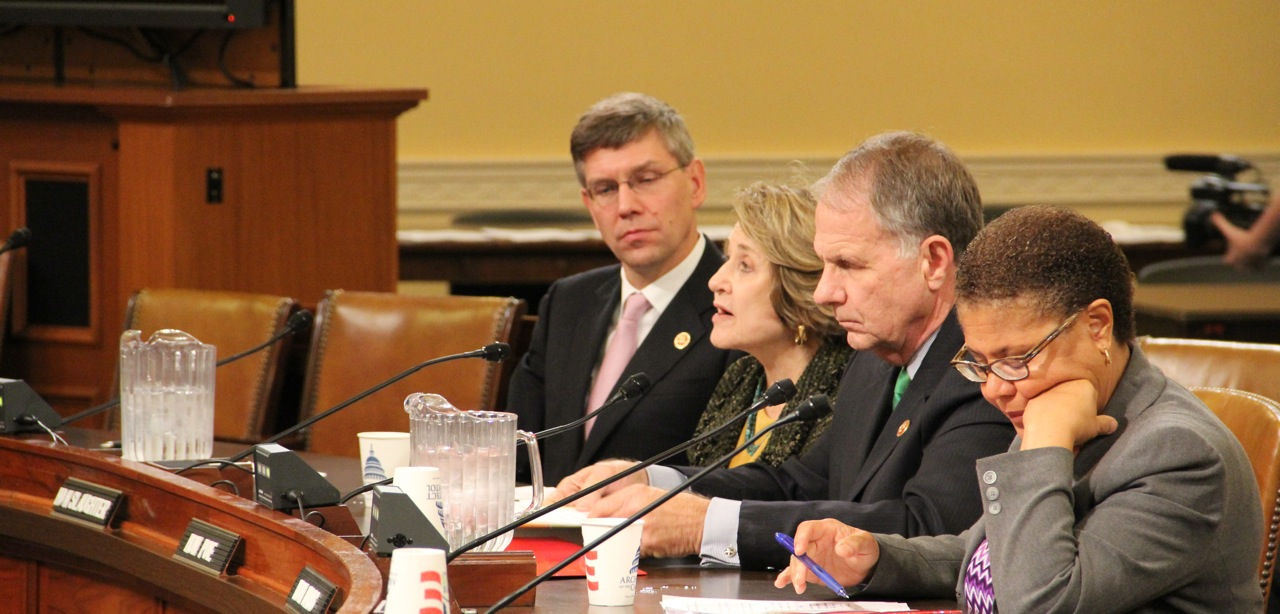
Louise Slaughter testifies at a Ways & Means Human Resources Subcommittee hearing on October 23, 2013. Louise testified in strong support of a bill she has co-sponsored with Rep. Erik Paulsen (R-MN) that address the high rate of children in foster care being recruited into sex trafficking within the United States. (10445204615)

Criminal laws exist at both the state and federal level that may be used to prosecute sex trafficking offenses. In addition, the Victims of Trafficking and Violence Protection Act of 2000 provides immigration protections to victims of sex trafficking who are not lawfully in the United States. To address the issue of sexual exploitation and sex trafficking of minors, the legal system operates through two interconnected justice systems: the adult criminal justice system and the juvenile justice system. These systems are responsible for investigating, prosecuting, and punishing offenders, as well as providing support and justice to victims and survivors.

The adult criminal justice system deals with cases where the perpetrator is an adult, and the crime has been committed against a minor. It comprises a vast network of law enforcement agencies, including federal, state, county, local, and tribal police departments, and specialized investigators who are trained to investigate crimes against children. The adult criminal justice system also involves probation officers, parole officers, and corrections officers who oversee the rehabilitation and supervision of convicted offenders. Prosecutors and defense attorneys represent the opposing sides in court, and judges make decisions based on the facts of the case and applicable laws. The juvenile justice system, on the other hand, is responsible for cases where both the perpetrator and the victim are minors. It operates with a focus on rehabilitation and providing support to minors who have been subjected to exploitation or trafficking. The system comprises specialized juvenile law enforcement agencies, juvenile probation officers, and juvenile courts. The goal of the juvenile justice system is to provide a safe and supportive environment for minors to recover from their trauma, and to prevent them from becoming victims of exploitation or trafficking in the future. To assist victims and survivors, both systems include victim advocates, who provide emotional support, guidance, and access to resources such as counseling, medical care, and legal services. They also work with law enforcement agencies to ensure that victims are protected from further harm and are treated with respect and dignity throughout the legal process. Overall, the legal system's response to sexual exploitation and sex trafficking of minors is complex and multifaceted, requiring the collaboration and coordination of a range of professionals across different justice systems to provide justice to victims and survivors while holding perpetrators accountable for their crimes.

=== Federal law ===
Act 18 U.S.C. § 1591, or the Commercial Sex Act, the US makes it illegal to recruit, entice, obtain, provide, move or harbor a person or to benefit from such activities knowing that the person will be caused to engage in commercial sex acts where the person is under 18 or where force, fraud or coercion exists. This law only applies to interstate trafficking.

==== Monitoring sex trafficking ====
The State Department publishes an annual Trafficking in Persons Report, which examines the progress that the U.S. and other countries have made in destroying human trafficking businesses, arresting the kingpins, and rescuing the victims.

==== Trafficking and Violence Protection Act of 2000 ====
Under the Bush Administration, fighting sex slavery worldwide and domestically became a priority with an average of $100 million spent per year, which substantially outnumbers the amount spent by other countries. Before President Bush took office, Congress passed and President Bill Clinton signed the Victims of Trafficking and Violence Protection Act of 2000 (TVPA). The TVPA strengthened services to victims of violence, law enforcements ability to reduce violence against women and children, and education against human trafficking. Also specified in the TVPA was a mandate to collect funds for the treatment of sex trafficking victims that provided them with shelter, food, education, and financial grants.

Internationally, the TVPA set standards that governments of other countries must follow in order to receive aid from the U.S. to fight human trafficking. Once George W. Bush took office in 2001, restricting sex trafficking became one of his primary humanitarian efforts. The Attorney General under President Bush, John Ashcroft, strongly enforced the TVPA. The Act was subsequently renewed in 2004, 2006, and 2008. It established two stipulations an applicant has to meet in order to receive the benefits of a T-Visa. First, a trafficked victim must prove/admit to being trafficked and second must submit to prosecution of his or her trafficker. Due to language/cultural barriers, mistrust in the government, and fear of persecution, trafficked victims often do not want to prosecute their trafficker. This leads to their inability to obtain the visa. In 2011, Congress failed to re-authorize the Act.

==== Proposed legislation ====
In September 2017, two anti-trafficking bills were proposed during a session of congress: the Stop Enabling Sex Traffickers Act (S. 1693) (SESTA) and the Allow States and Victims to Fight Online Sex Trafficking Act (H.R. 1865). Although US Senators Rob Portman, Richard Blumenthal and Claire McCaskill authored SESTA specifically to strengthen existing laws combatting sex trafficking, the bill was mainly met with negative responses online, with many expressing concerns that they would endanger online free speech and social media by gutting Section 230, a law that enables platforms relied on by many users on the internet.

=== State law ===
Each state has its own laws for dealing with trafficking within its own state. Prosecution may occur under laws that specifically address sex trafficking, or under other laws such as laws prohibiting commercial sex services, including prosecution for any acts of abuse or unlawful detention of the victims of sex offenses.

In 31 states, victims of sex trafficking may potentially be charged with crimes they were forced to commit.

== Current situation ==
The San Francisco Chronicle reported in 2006 that in the 21st century, women, mostly from South America, Southeast Asia, and the former Soviet Union, are trafficked into the United States for the purposes of sexual slavery. A 2006 ABC News story stated that, contrary to existing misconceptions, American citizens may also be coerced into sex slavery.

In 2001 the United States State Department estimated that 50,000 to 100,000 women and girls are trafficked each year into the United States. In 2003, the State Department report estimated that a total of 18,000 to 20,000 individuals were trafficked into the United States for either forced labor or sexual exploitation. The June 2004 report estimated the total trafficked annually at between 14,500 and 17,500. The Bush administration set up 42 Justice Department task forces and spent more than $150 million on attempts to reduce human trafficking. However, in the seven years since the law was passed, the administration has identified only 1,362 victims of human trafficking brought into the United States since 2000, nowhere near the 50,000 or more per year the government had estimated.

The Girls Educational and Mentoring Services (GEMS), an organization based in New York, claims that the majority of girls in the sex trade were abused as children. Poverty and a lack of education play major roles in the lives of many women in the sex industry.

According to a report conducted by the University of Pennsylvania, anywhere from 100,000 up to 300,000 American children at any given time may be at risk of exploitation due to factors such as drug use, homelessness, or other factors connected with increased risk for commercial sexual exploitation. However, the report emphasized, "The numbers presented in these exhibits do not, therefore, reflect the actual number of cases of CSEC in the United States but, rather, what we estimate to be the number of children ‘at risk’ of commercial sexual exploitation." Richard J. Estes, one of the report's authors, noted that the report was based on 25 year old data, and was out of date because the world of the 1990s "was quite a different one from that in which we live today." A report from the University of New Hampshire says that only 1,700 kids reported having engaged in prostitution. David Finkelhor, one of the authors of that report, said "Given that running away has declined, I wouldn’t put any stock in these figures as indicators of what is going on today". People of color may also have high risks of sex trafficking due to lack of documentation, fear, distrust, etc. They often have difficulties contacting authorities or others for support due to inabilities to understand the language or the laws of the area.

The 2010 Trafficking in Persons report described the United States as, "a source, transit, and destination country for men, women, and children subjected to trafficking in persons, specifically forced labor, debt bondage, and forced prostitution." Sexual slavery in the United States may occur in multiple forms and in multiple venues. Sex trafficking in the United States may be present in Asian massage parlors, Mexican cantina bars, residential brothels, or street-based pimp-controlled prostitution. The anti-trafficking community in the United States is debating the extent of sexual slavery. Some groups argue that exploitation is inherent in the act of commercial sex, while other groups take a stricter approach to defining sexual slavery, considering an element of force, fraud or coercion to be necessary for sex slavery to exist.

In 2000, Congress created the Victims of Trafficking and Violence Protection Act with tougher punishments for sex traffickers. It provides for the possibility for former sex slaves to obtain a T-1 visa. To obtain the visa women must, "prove they were enslaved by 'force, fraud or coercion'." The visa allows former victims of sex trafficking to stay in the United States for 3 years and then apply for a green card.

In 2014, the U.S. Commission on Civil Rights issued a report entitled "Sex Trafficking: A Gender-Based Civil Rights Violation".

In March 2019, the University of Cincinnati, Ohio, published a report that they'd identified 1,032 victims between 2014 and 2016 and another 4,209 individuals at risk of being trafficked during the same.

== Types of sex trafficking ==
Research conducted by University of California at Berkeley on behalf of the anti-trafficking organization Free the Slaves, found that about 46% of people in slavery in the United States are forced into prostitution. The U.S. Department of Justice prosecuted 360 defendants for human trafficking from 2001 to 2007 and gained 238 convictions.

From January 2007 through September 2008, there were 1,229 alleged cases of human trafficking nationally; 1,018 of them, nearly 83 percent, were sex trafficking cases. Sex trafficking has a close relationship with migrant smuggling operations headed by Mexican, Eastern European, and Asian crime organizations. Migrants from countries wrecked by violence are displaced groups and flee the countries as refugees, such as from countries in Southeast Asia. The circumstances that lead individuals to migrate elsewhere cause them to become more desperate for employment and money in the countries they immigrated to. Traffickers often target immigrants through means of coercion, such as false promises of citizenship papers and documents. They can also partner with corrupt immigration officers, where payoffs can allow the acquisition of false visas and passports.

Domestic servitude claims 27% of people in slavery in the U.S., agriculture 10%, and other occupations 17%.

=== Commercial sexual exploitation of children ===
In 2003, 1,400 minors were arrested for prostitution, 14% of whom were younger than 14 years old. A study conducted by the International Labor Union indicated that boys are at a higher risk of being trafficked into agricultural work, the drug trade, and petty crime. Girls were at a higher risk of being forced into the sex industry and domestic work. In 2004, the Department of Labor found 1,087 minors employed in situations that violated hazardous occupation standards. The same year, 5,480 children were employed violating child labor laws. Due to the secretive nature of trafficking, it is difficult to piece together an accurate picture of how widespread the problem is.

In 2001, the University of Pennsylvania School of Social Work released a study on CSEC conducted in 17 cities across the United States. While they did not interview any of the adolescent subjects of the inquiry, they estimated through secondary response that as many as 300,000 American youth may be at risk of commercial sexual exploitation at any time. However, the actual number of children involved in prostitution is likely to be much smaller: over 10 years only 827 cases a year had been reported to police departments. Scholarly research funded by the National Institute of Justice and realized by the Social Networks Research Group at John Jay College of Criminal Justice and the Center for Court Innovation in New York City had used Respondent Driven Sampling (RDS), Social Network Analysis, capture/recapture, and Markov based probability estimates in 2008 to generate a prevalence estimate for New York City that suggested far fewer commercially sexually exploited children than the 300,000 and far more than the 827 suggested by these two most widely read sources.

Especially vulnerable are homeless and runaways. The National Runaway Switchboard said in 2009 that one-third of runaway youths in America will be lured into prostitution within 48 hours on the streets. This view of adolescent prostitution in the United States as primarily driven by pimp-exploiters and other "sex traffickers" was challenged by SNRG-NYC in their 2008 New York City study which interviewed over 300 under-age prostitutes and found that only 10% reported having pimps. A 2012 study done in Atlantic City, New Jersey, led by Anthony Marcus and Ric Curtis incorporated an extended qualitative ethnographic component that looked specifically at the relationship between pimps and adolescents engaged with street based sex markets. This study found the percentage of adolescents who had pimps to be only 14% and that those relationships were typically far more complex, mutual, and companionate than has been reported by social service providers, not-for-profits, and much of the news media.

The New York State Office of Children and Family Services estimated in 2007 that New York City is home to more than 2,000 sexually exploited children under 18. At least 85 percent of these youths statewide have had some contact with the child welfare system, mostly through abuse or neglect proceedings. In New York City, 75 percent have been in foster care. Mishi Faruqee, who is in charge of juvenile justice issues for the Correctional Association of New York, questioned the reliability of the estimate. "We believe that number is really an undercount." This is confirmed by SNRG-NYC's New York City population estimate of 2008 which was 3,946. The SNRG-NYC New York City study found that out of 249 underage prostitutes (48% female and 45% male) who constituted the final statistical sample, the average age of entry into the market was 15.29.

In 2017, there were an estimated 79,000 child sex trafficking victims in Texas, according to a two-year research study by the University of Texas.

In 2018, an estimated 10,000 people in New Mexico are being sexually victimized by traffickers every day, according to KRWG News.

=== Pimp-controlled trafficking ===
In pimp-controlled trafficking, the victim is controlled by a single pimp. The victim can be controlled by the pimp physically, psychologically, and/or emotionally.

Some argue that pimps often work by first gaining the trust of the victim, in what is called the grooming stage, then seek to make the victim dependent on them. Once the victim is comfortable, the pimp moves to the seasoning stage, where they will ask the victim to perform sexual acts for the pimp, which the victim may do because they believe it is the only way to keep the trafficker's affection. The requests progress from there and it can be difficult for the victim to escape both physically and mentally from the pressures of it.

Critics argue that it is unclear how typical such narratives are in pimp/sex worker dynamics, that some but not all pimp-involved sex work qualifies as trafficking, and that some pimp/sex worker dyads are more collaborative and less violent or controlling.

=== Gang trafficking ===
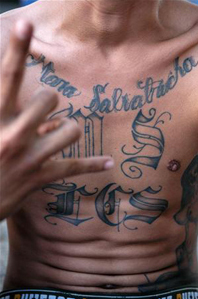
MS gang sign and tattoos

In gang trafficking, the victim is controlled by more than one person. Gangs are more often turning to sex trafficking as it is seen as safer and more lucrative than drug trafficking. A victim controlled by gang trafficking may be sexually exploited by gang members as well as sold outside of the gang. They may tattoo their victims to show their ownership over them.

Federal prosecutors have indicted numerous MS-13 gang members on sex trafficking charges.

In 2011, Alonso "Casper" Bruno Cornejo Ormeno, an associate of MS-13 from Fairfax, Virginia was sentenced to 292 months in prison for child prostitution. Ormeno recruited juvenile females into a prostitution ring by locating runaway children.

In June 2012, Rances Ulices Amaya, a leader of MS-13, of Springfield was sentenced to 50 years in prison for child prostitution. He was convicted in February 2012 for trafficking girls as young as 14 into a prostitution ring. They were lured from middle schools, high schools, and public shelters. Once acquired by Amaya, they were required to have sex with a minimum of 10 individuals per day.

In September 2012, Yimmy Anthony Pineda Penado, also known as "Critico" and "Spike", of Maryland was a former "clique leader" of MS-13. Penado became the 11th MS-13 gang member to be convicted of child prostitution since 2011.

=== Survival sex ===
In survival sex, the victim is not necessarily controlled by a certain person but feels they have to perform sexual acts in order to obtain basic commodities to survive. They are considered a victim of sex trafficking if they are below the age of consent and are legally unable to consent to the sexual acts. This framing of sex trafficking emerged during the period of second-wave feminism during the early 1960s, 1970s, and 1980s in the United States.

=== Familial trafficking ===
In familial trafficking, the victim is controlled by family members who allow them to be sexually exploited in exchange for something, such as drugs or money. For example, a mother may allow a boyfriend to abuse a child in exchange for a place to stay. Often, the mother was a victim of human trafficking herself. Usually, it begins with one family member and spreads from there. Familial trafficking may be difficult to detect because they often have a larger degree of freedom, such as going to school. They may not understand that they are being trafficked or may not have a way out.

=== Forced marriages ===
Estimates are that hundreds of Pakistani girls in New York have been flown out of the New York City area to Pakistan to undergo forced marriages; those who resist are threatened and coerced. A study of 100 students from this background in New York by the AHA Foundation confirmed that "there is significant and widespread intra-familial conflict over marital choice within [the Middle Eastern, North African, and South Asian migrant] population and that forced marriage may be a problem for some young people in US migrant communities." However, AHA has successfully referred numerous individuals seeking help in fleeing or avoiding a forced marriage with qualified service providers and law enforcement. The organization Unchained at Last, the only organization of its kind in the United States, assists women in forced or arranged marriages with free legal services and other resources. It was founded by Fraidy Reiss.

The Fundamentalist Church of Jesus Christ of Latter-Day Saints (FLDS) has been suspected of trafficking underage women across state lines, as well as across the US–Canada and US–Mexico borders, for the purpose of sometimes involuntary plural marriage and sexual abuse. The FLDS is suspected by the Royal Canadian Mounted Police of having trafficked more than 30 under-age girls from Canada to the United States between the late 1990s and 2006 to be entered into polygamous marriages. RCMP spokesman Dan Moskaluk said of the FLDS's activities: "In essence, it's human trafficking in connection with illicit sexual activity." According to the Vancouver Sun, it's unclear whether or not Canada's anti-human trafficking statute can be effectively applied against the FLDS's pre-2005 activities, because the statute may not be able to be applied retroactively. An earlier three-year-long investigation by local authorities in British Columbia into allegations of sexual abuse, human trafficking, and forced marriages by the FLDS resulted in no charges, but did result in legislative change. Former FLDS members have also alleged that children belonging to the sect were forced to perform sexual acts as children upon older men while being unable to leave. This has been described by numerous former members as sexual slavery, and was reported as such by the Sydney Morning Herald, One former resident of Yearning for Zion, Kathleen Mackert, stated: "I was required to perform oral sex on my father when I was seven, and it escalated from there."

== Sex trafficking venues ==
=== Internet ===
Traffickers often use interactive computer services to advertise their victims. According to Section 230 of the Communications Decency Act, interactive computer services are not held accountable for content provided by another party. This provides anonymity to the traffickers and immunity to the computer services company. The same victim will often be advertised across multiple forms of media, including classified ads, social media, chat rooms, message boards, text message and patrolling streets.

On September 4, 2010, Craigslist closed the adult services section of its website in the United States because of criticism and complaints from attorneys general that the section's ads were facilitating prostitution and child sex trafficking. As a result, adult posting offerings for other sites increased. Law enforcement agents have said that many traffickers simply moved to other sites after Craigslist closed its erotic section. This has created problems for law enforcement because the new sites may not be as cooperative as Craigslist or, if they are not based in the United States, it is more difficult to subpoena them.

The majority of child sex trafficking cases referred to the National Center for Missing and Exploited Children (NCMEC) involve ads on Backpage.com, a classified advertising website. Each month, Backpage blocks about a million ads, mostly suspected of child sex trafficking or prostitution. Of those, around 400 ads a month are sent to the NCMEC which in turn alerts law enforcement. The NCMEC say these efforts are inadequate and that Backpage encourages dissemination of child sex trafficking content on its website.

Social media has played an increasing role in sex trafficking, particularly Facebook and MocoSpace according to law enforcement personnel. These sites can be used to advertise victims and as a mechanism for traffickers to maintain control over victims and keeping in contact with johns. Law enforcement tends to focus on classified ads and have limited knowledge and training in navigating social networking sites. Facebook groups that are used for sex trafficking often have sexually explicit keywords. It may advertise the services of a girl without her being a member of the group. The groups tend to be mostly men with possibly a few young girls.

Other traffickers will create their own website. San Diego Adult Service Provider was a member-only website that was used for sex trafficking. Members were charged $100 a month and the website operator personally vetted every member in order to evade law enforcement. The website was taken down in 2016.

A 2014 report published by the Urban Institute says, "Forty-nine percent of pimps reported using Internet ads to attract business. Online classifieds, social media vehicles, discussion boards, chat rooms, dating websites, and custom web pages are commonly used to attract and book new business."

=== Hotels and motels ===
Hotels and motels are a major venue for domestic sex trafficking. Traffickers can quickly change locations to avoid detection and buyers prefer the anonymity. Trafficking in hotels tend to be pimp-based, with most victims being US citizens. Many hotel staff and employees are not trained, and many hotel owners avoid making a public stand because they do not want their names associated with sex trafficking.

Some hotels have signed on to the Tourism Child-Protection Code of Conduct developed by ECPAT, a voluntary set of principles that businesses in the tourism and travel industry can adopt to fight trafficking. Wyndham Hotels & Resorts has partnered with Polaris Project to develop comprehensive training and educational tools for hotel owners and franchisees, property-level staff and employees at its corporate offices and call centers to educate them about all aspects of human trafficking.

To combat the problem, some members of advocacy groups hand out pamphlets about sex trafficking to local hotel concierges. They ask them to be on the lookout for women who appear fearful and show signs of being controlled by the men they're with. Some groups give hotels bars of soap that have a sex trafficking hotline phone number on them.

=== Massage parlors ===
The prostitutes in illegal massage parlors may be forced to work out of apartment complexes for many hours a day. Many clients may not realize that some of the women who work in these massage sex parlors are actually forced in prostitution. The women may initially be lured into the US under false pretenses. In huge debt to their 'owners', they are forced to earn enough to eventually "buy" their freedom. In some cases women who have been sex trafficked may be forced to undergo plastic surgery or abortions. A chapter in The Slave Next Door (2009) reports that human trafficking and sexual enslavement are not limited to any specific location or social class. It concludes that individuals in society need to be alert to report suspicious behavior, because the psychological and physical abuse occurs which can often leave a victim unable to escape on their own.

=== Sporting events ===
While there is substantial evidence to the contrary, including research published by the Global Alliance Against Traffic in Women in 2011 warning that the repetition of unsupported data leads to human rights violations against trafficking victims and voluntary sex workers, Texas Attorney General Greg Abbott claims that sporting events, particularly the Super Bowl, are a prominent haven for sex trafficking. According to the National Center for Missing and Exploited Children, 10,000 prostitutes were brought to Miami for the Super Bowl in 2010, and 133 underage arrests for prostitution were made in Dallas during the 2011 Super Bowl. No data exists to support claims that large-scale sporting events are accompanied by an increase in sex trafficking, and research by the Observatory of Prostitution at the Federal University of Rio de Janeiro during the 2014 FIFA World Cup shows that there was even "a general decline in sexual commerce during the 32 days of the event." Kate Mogulescu, the founding and supervising attorney at The Legal Aid Society's Trafficking Victims Advocacy Project, suggests that the rescue of sex trafficking victims is used as a guise by city officials to increase law enforcement activity in order to "clean up" the city before events that draw national and international media.

A study was done on online classified ads surrounding the Super Bowl. For the 2011 Super Bowl held in Dallas, Texas, the Backpage website for the Dallas area experienced a 136 percent increase on the number of posts in the Adult section that Sunday. Typically, Sundays were known to be the day of the week with the lowest number of posts in the Adult section. Researchers analyzed the most salient terms in these online ads and found that most commonly used words suggested that many escorts were traveling across state lines to Dallas specifically for the Super Bowl. Also, the self-reported ages were higher than usual which conveys that an older population of sex workers were drawn to the event, but since these are self-reported the data is not reliable. During Super Bowls, the ECPTA-USA runs campaigns to raise awareness of sex trafficking, mobilizes volunteers and trains people involved in tourism.

In recent years, law authorities have led sting operations in connection with Super Bowl games. During the Super Bowl XLVIII, authorities arrested 45 pimps and rescued 25 child prostitutes. During Super Bowl XLIX, authorities led a sting operation called National Day of Johns and arrested almost 600 people and rescued 68 victims.

=== Truck stops ===
Truck stops such as rest areas and welcome centers are centers for sex trafficking. They are often geographically isolated and insulated from the communities, making it easier for traffickers and customers to avoid detection and harder for victims to escape. The transient nature of truck stops makes it easier for traffickers to frequently relocate without arousing suspicion and attracts a customer base of men who have been traveling and are in search of commercial sex. Truck stops have both individual pimps who are constantly relocating their victims and brothels that have a use local businesses, typically massage parlors, as store fronts. Traffickers often force their victims to advertise over CB radio, knock on truck cab doors, or directly offer services to customers. Victims also may be forced to walk down the tarmac, and customers will flash their lights if they are interested. Customers may also solicit services on their CB radio by asking for commercial company.

Many truck drivers do not realize that many of the prostitutes are victims and view them nuisances, calling them lot lizards. Truckers Against Trafficking (TAT) is a nonprofit organization that trains truck drivers to recognize and report instances of human trafficking. TAT produces anti-trafficking materials which are commonly seen throughout the trucking industry. They have teamed up with law enforcement agencies and trucking companies to provide training on identifying sex trafficking, and some companies require their drivers to go through it. Through their efforts, they have freed hundreds of human trafficking victims. According to the National Human Trafficking Resource Center, the majority of truck drivers who report tips learned about them through TAT.

=== Brothels ===
==== Latino brothels ====
Brothels catering exclusively to Latino males, referred to as "Latino Residential Brothels", are a major vehicle for sex trafficking, with the victims being almost exclusively women and children from Latin America. Trafficking of U.S. citizens within the U.S. occurs as well. They typically own informal underground businesses in urban, suburban, and rural areas. Brothels move their victims move from place to place in order to avoid detection and the victims from getting to know the area.

==== Legal brothels in Nevada ====
Prostitution of adults is legal in 10 rural counties in Nevada. By creating false identification, outside pimps can use these brothels to traffic children. Detective Greg Harvey, from Eugene, Oregon, said such cases were in reality very common; he said, "It's happening right now, it's amazing how many girls are shipped from here to different brothels in northern and southern Nevada. Many are underage." Another detective, Sgt. Pete Kerns, supported Harvey's claims: "Never buy the line that nobody under 18 works in (Nevada brothels)," he said. "It's happening."

In her 2007 report, Prostitution and trafficking in Nevada: making the connections, Melissa Farley presents the results of numerous interviews with brothel owners and prostitutes, she says that most brothel prostitutes are controlled by outside pimps and that they suffer widespread abuse by brothel owners and customers. Bob Herbert supports the claim, stating: "Despite the fiction that they are "independent contractors," most so-called legal prostitutes have pimps — the state-sanctioned pimps who run the brothels and, in many cases, a second pimp who controls all other aspects of their lives (and takes the bulk of their legal earnings)."

Brothel industry lobbyist George Flint disagreed, saying "Anybody that has an ounce of brain or intelligence has to know they (legal and illegal prostitution) are two different things. We don't traffic women. We don't hire trafficked women. We don't work with pimps. We treat the girls with respect and dignity and we take care of them."

Alexa Albert says that the trafficking is done in cooperation with brothel owners, so the prostitutes will be easier to control. Assemblyman Bob L. Beers said that "A brothel owner is somebody who, when it gets down to the very essence, is nothing more than a slave-owner." Former Nye County Commissioner Candice Trummell, director of the Nevada Coalition Against Sex Trafficking, said "It is way past time for Nevada to be the last state in the United States of America to finally stand against all forms of slavery."

In 2009, an article in the Guardian stated that some counties and towns "impose some extraordinary restrictions on commercial sex workers" in order to "separate sex workers from the local community": some places forbid prostitutes to leave the brothels for extended periods of time, while other jurisdictions require the prostitutes to leave the county when they are not working; some places do not allow the children of the women who work in the brothels to live in the same area; some brothel workers are not permitted to leave the brothel after 5pm; in some counties registered sex workers are not allowed to have cars at all. Another former prostitute who worked in four Nevada brothels attacked the system, saying, "Under this system, prostitutes give up too much autonomy, control and choice over their work and lives" and "While the brothel owners love this profitable solution, it can be exploitative and is unnecessary". She described how the women were subject to various exaggerated restrictions, including making it very difficult for them to refuse clients and having to deal with doctors who had a "patronizing or sexist attitude" (the brothels discouraged and in many cases forbade prostitutes to see doctors of their own choosing).

=== Prisons ===
Transgender women in male prisons deal with the risk of forced prostitution by both prison staff and other prisoners. Forced prostitution can occur when a correction officer brings a transgender woman to the cell of a male inmate and locks them in so that the male inmate can rape her. The male inmate will then pay the correction officer in some way and sometimes the correction officer will give the woman a portion of the payment. The prisoners serving as customers for these women are informally referred to as "husbands". Trans women who physically resist the customer's advances are often criminally charged with assault and placed in solitary confinement, the assault charge then being used to extend the woman's prison stay and deny her parole. This practice is known as V-coding, and has been described as so common that it is effectively "a central part of a trans woman's sentence".

== Anti-sex trafficking organizations ==
- Shared Hope International (SHI) is a nonprofit, non-governmental organization that exists to prevent sex trafficking and restore and bring justice to women and children who have been victimized through sex trafficking. Shared Hope leads awareness and training, prevention strategies, restorative care, research, and policy initiatives to mobilize a national network of protection for victims. Shared Hope International was founded in 1998 by former Congresswoman Linda Smith.
- Girls Educational and Mentoring Services (GEMS) is a non-profit organization that provides services to commercially sexually exploited and domestically trafficked girls and young women, typically underage youth exploited by pimps and traffickers. The organization was founded in 1998 by Rachel Lloyd and is based in Harlem, New York City. The organization has helped several hundred young girls transition out of the sex industry and get back to their full potential. They also participated in lobbying for passage of the Safe Harbor Act for Sexually Exploited Youth, which provides that girls under the age of 16, who are arrested in New York for prostitution will be treated as victims, rather than criminals. The bill was signed into law in September 2008.
- Breaking Free provides various services to prostitutes, such as help finding a place to live and a job outside the sex industry in Minnesota. The motto of the organization is "sisters helping sisters break free".
- Not for Sale is an international non-profit organization based out of San Francisco, California that works to protect people and communities around the world from human trafficking and modern-day slavery.
- Sacramento Against Sex Slavery in Massage Parlors is a Sacramento-based organizations that focuses on ending sex slavery in massage parlors.

== Media ==
- Very Young Girls is a 2007 documentary on the work of Girls Educational and Mentoring Services (GEMS).
- "Dolan's Cadillac" is a 1985 novella by Stephen King about a school teacher whose wife witnesses a murder in connection with child sex trafficking.
- Human Trafficking is a 2005 television miniseries about an American Immigration and Customs Enforcement agent going undercover to stop an organization from trafficking people, and shows the struggles of three trafficked women.
- Nefarious: Merchant of Souls is a 2011 American documentary film about modern human trafficking, specifically sexual slavery. Presented from a Christian worldview, Nefarious covers human trafficking in the United States, Western and Eastern Europe, and Southeast Asia, alternating interviews with re-enactments.
- Not My Life is a 2011 independent documentary film about human trafficking and contemporary slavery. The title Not My Life came from a June 2009 interview with Molly Melching, founder of Tostan, who said that many people deny the reality of contemporary slavery because it is an uncomfortable truth, saying, "No, this is not my life."
- Trade is a 2007 film about a Mexican girl sold into sexual slavery in the United States.
- Sound of Freedom is a Christian docudrama based on real-life government agent Tim Ballard and starring Jim Caviezel. The plot centers around Ballard's Operation Underground Railroad, an anti-sex trafficking organization. The movie was released by Angel Studios on July 4, 2023 and grossed $250 million.

== See also ==
- Human trafficking in the United States
- Forced prostitution in the United States
- Sexual slavery in the United States
- Child marriage in the United States
- Jeffrey Epstein
- Ghislaine Maxwell
- John David Norman
- Sean Combs
