= Human trafficking in New York =

Illegal human trade for sex and slavery in the State of New York

Human trafficking in New York is the illegal trade of human beings for the purposes of reproductive slavery, commercial sexual exploitation, and forced labor. It occurs in the state of New York and is widely recognized as a modern-day form of slavery. It includes, "the recruitment, transportation, transfer, harboring or receipt of persons by means of threat or use of force or other forms of coercion, of abduction, of fraud, of deception, of the abuse of power, or of a position of vulnerability or of the giving or receiving of payments or benefits to achieve the consent of a person having control over another person, for the purpose of exploitation. Exploitation shall include, at a minimum, the exploitation of the prostitution of others or other forms of sexual exploitation, forced labor services, slavery or practices similar to slavery, servitude or the removal of organs."

In 2016, New York State implemented a plan to focus on the main areas of trafficking. The plan included raising awareness, helping to identify the victim, providing better services, and legislative and programmatic advocacy. The purpose was to educate people, train them to identify warning signs and understand how to assess a situation where trafficking has occurred. There were 1,541 confirmed victims of human trafficking in New York State in 2019.

== History of slavery ==
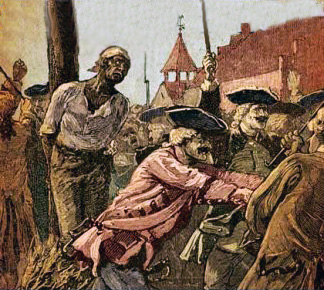
Slave being burned at the stake in N.Y.C. after the 1741 slave insurrection.

"Almost every businessman in 18th-century New York had a stake, at one time or another, in the traffic in human beings". In New York, up to 20 percent of the population was enslaved African Americans. The first slave was brought into New York in 1626. Most of the city's local economy came from supplying various ships with the trade of slaves and the goods that they produced. The captains of the boats would buy or sell the slaves along the coast of Africa or even at the local bars of their city. A few of the main items that were produced by slaves were sugar, tobacco, indigo, coffee, chocolate, and cotton. The slaves had built many well-known buildings in New York including the prisons, hospitals, and churches. They even built the first city hall and the wall from which Wall Street got its name. Even though slavery was different in New York, it was equally as brutal. Slaves were beaten and humiliated in public by their punishments and threatened with death every day. In 1799, New York passed a law that eventually released all the slaves. The last legal slave was freed in 1827.

=== Historical murals and monuments ===
In the State of New York, there are several historical murals and monuments that depict slavery and human trafficking. Some murals have been hidden away or destroyed over time but there were many over the years that have survived and made public or national monuments. One of the monuments that is known on a national scale is the "African Burial Ground Monument" which depicts some of the first continental human trafficking on a massive scale. This also honors the lives of the slaves that were buried there in New York City after the "long-forgotten chapter in New York’s history when enslaved Africans helped build New Amsterdam". Another monument is the ark of return, a monument in the New York City branch of the United Nations. The monument honors over 18 million slaves that were trafficked during the time of the middle passage. The Swing Low: A Memorial to Harriet Tubman, in New York City. This monument was erected in memory of Harriet Tubman and her freeing of many slaves over her lifetime. The mural that was erected in Syracuse, New York, with depiction of slavery, is in the Syracuse Marriott Hotel. Although the full mural has been covered by the staff, it still remains a part of the hotel's history.

== Demographics ==
In New York, human trafficking and all other forms of slavery are illegal and have been illegal since 1840, after an extensive court proceeding that pushed for the freedom of all slaves in New York began in 1799. However, the National Human Trafficking Resource Center keeps statistics on the number of reported cases of human trafficking and slavery in New York State. In 2011, the Department of State reported that New York, together with California, Texas, and Oklahoma, had the largest concentrations of survivors of human trafficking.

2007-2018
Statistics		
Total calls	6,453	
Total cases	2,147	
Total victims	Moderate 2,575	High 2,510

These are the current call logs from 2007 to 2018.

"Victims & Survivors Identified 2018"
High Indicators	Moderate Indicators	Calls From Victims & Survivors
229	502	92

These numbers are the current documented victims and survivors of Human trafficking within New York State from 2018.

"Types of trafficking 2018"
Sex Trafficking	Labor Trafficking	Sex & Labor	Not specified	Total
151	25	17	13	206

The numbers above are the different types of human trafficking within the State of New York from 2018.

"Top Venues/ industries for labor trafficking"
Domestic Work	Other Industries	Retail/ Other Small Businesses	Agriculture	Restaurants/ Food Services
6	4	Less than 3	Less than 3	Less Than 3

These numbers show the documented industries in which human labor trafficking was discovered within New York State in 2018.

"Top Venues/ industries for sex trafficking"
Illicit Massage/ Spa Business	Residence-Based Commercial Sex	Hotel/ Motel-Based	Escort Services	Online Ad, Venue Unknown
21	14	13	13	13

These are the industries in which sex trafficking was discovered and documented in New York State in 2018.

"Gender Age and citizenship"
Gender		Age		Citizenship	
Male	30	Adult	116	U.S. Citizen	28
Female	170	Minor	64	Foreign National Citizen	48
Non Binary	4				

The chart above shows the gender, age, and citizenship status of all the known and documented cases of human trafficking within New York State in 2018.

== Profiling in trafficking ==
=== Historical changes ===
Throughout the course of contemporary human trafficking, the profiles of victims and perpetrators have changed slightly. In New York, women are still the primary target for trafficking, but the number of men trafficked across U.S. borders has increased. 60% of those trafficked in the U.S. are women.

=== Common forms ===
The United Nations Office on Drugs and Crime (UNODC) has found that the majority of human trafficking victims in the U.S. are women, and the largest proportion of human trafficking is sex trafficking and the sexual exploitation of young women. These trends are reflected in New York in recent years.

=== Perpetrators ===
A study conducted by the National Criminal Justice Reference Service (NCJRS) found that the majority of convicted offenders were found to operate alone or with a small group of family members, rather than entire organizations. The study also found that most of the offenders were men.

== Laws ==
- The New York State Anti-trafficking law was created in 2007. It created the crimes of Labor Trafficking and Sex Trafficking, provides immunity for victims and gives benefits and services to the victims.
- New York State Safe Harbor for Exploited Children Act was created in 2008, giving exploited children protection from the Family Court and access to services.
- In June 2018, New York passed harsher sex trafficking laws. These laws were primarily made to better combat what was once viewed as weaker child sex trafficking laws.
- In August 2018, Senator Patrick M. Gallivan presented three possible bills to try and put an end to trafficking within the state.

=== Legal cases ===
Examples of legal cases involving, slavery and/or human trafficking in the state of New York include:

- Derek Harris, a sex trafficker in Buffalo. Tried and found guilty in November 2017, Derek was the first person to be tried in Erie County under New York's 2007 Anti-Trafficking law.
- Occurring in 2018, a proclaimed "self-help guru" (Keith Raniere), was discovered in New York to be running an illegal sex trafficking ring. Raniere was the head of a group located around the Albany area, and known as NXVIM, which is a self-help marketing company, likened to a cult and pyramid scheme. Raniere was listed to have branded his victims (listed as his "sex slaves") with his initials, before partaking in non-consensual intercourse. The trial for this case began Tuesday May 7, 2019.

== Organizations ==
- New York State Anti-Trafficking Coalition is an umbrella group of more than 140 anti-trafficking organizations, and work toward raising public awareness, pass laws, improve law enforcement, and providing services to victims of human trafficking. Together with Sanctuary for Families it launched New York's New Abolitionists campaign to raise awareness of human trafficking.
- Girls Educational and Mentoring Services (GEMS) is a non-profit organization that provides services to commercially sexually exploited and domestically trafficked girls and young women, typically underage youth exploited by pimps and traffickers. The organization was founded in 1998 by Rachel Lloyd and is based in Harlem, New York City. The organization has helped several hundred young girls transition out of the sex industry and get back to their full potential. They also participated in lobbying for passage of the Safe Harbor Act for Sexually Exploited Youth, which provides that girls under the age of 16, who are arrested in New York for prostitution will be treated as victims, rather than criminals. The bill was signed into law in September 2008. The work of GEMS is the subject of the 2007 documentary Very Young Girls.
