= History of slavery in New York (state) =

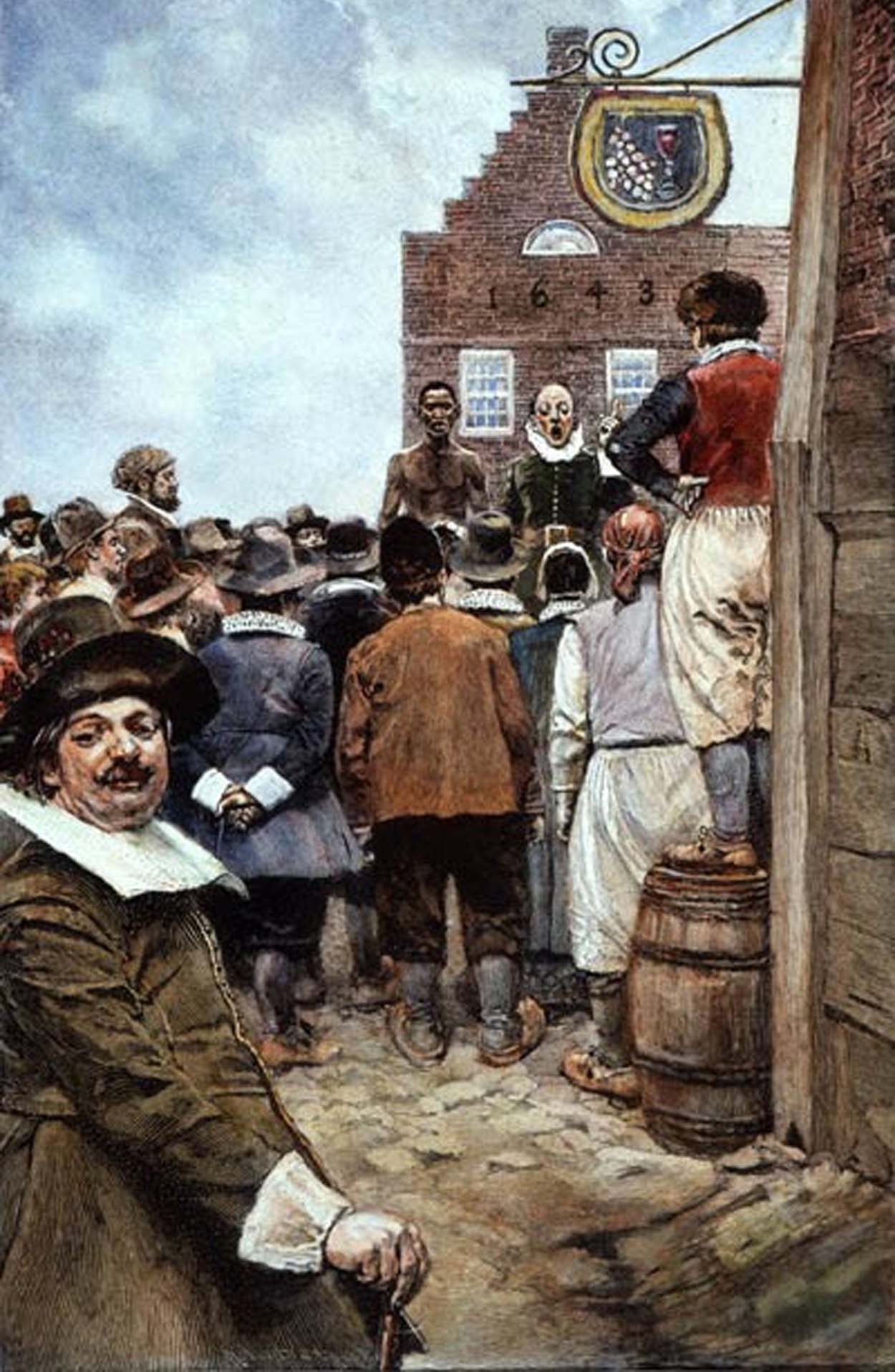
The first slave auction in New Amsterdam in 1655, painted by Howard Pyle, 1917

The enslavement of Africans in the region that became the State of New York began under the Dutch West India Company as part of the Atlantic slave trade. The Dutch West India Company brought eleven enslaved Africans to New Amsterdam in 1626, with the first slave auction held in New Amsterdam in 1655, making the beginning of institutionalized slavery in what would become New York City. With the second-highest proportion of any city in the colonies (after Charleston, South Carolina), more than 42% of New York City households enslaved African people by 1703, often as domestic servants and laborers. Others worked as artisans or in shipping and various trades in the city. Enslaved Africans were also used in farming on Long Island and in the Hudson Valley, as well as the Mohawk Valley region. Despite Northern geography, New York developed one of the largest enslaved populations outside the South, and the legacy of slavery remained visible in the city's social and economic hierarchies well into the 19th century.

During the American Revolutionary War, British troops occupied New York City in 1776. The Philipsburg Proclamation promised freedom to enslaved persons who left rebel masters, and thousands moved to the city for refuge with the British. By 1780, around 10,000 black people lived in New York. They created vibrant communities within the city, supporting one another through churches, mutual-aid networks, and informal economies. Many had escaped from their enslavers who lived in both northern and southern colonies. After the war, the British evacuated about 3,000 enslaved people from New York, taking most of them to resettle as free people in Nova Scotia, where they are known as Black Loyalists.

After the American Revolution, the New York Manumission Society was founded in 1785 to work for the abolition of slavery and to aid free Black people. The state passed a 1799 law for gradual abolition, a law which freed no living slave. After that date, children born to enslaved mothers were required to work for the mother's enslaver as indentured servants until age 28 (men) and 25 (women). The last enslaved persons were freed of this obligation 28 years later, on July 4, 1827. African Americans celebrated with the Emancipation Day parade on July 5, marching in organized groups with music, banners, and church leaders, followed by speeches, prayers, and community celebrations throughout New York City.

Upstate New York, in contrast with New York City, was an anti-slavery leader. The first meeting of the New York State Anti-Slavery Society opened in Utica, although local hostility caused the meeting to be moved to the home of Gerrit Smith, in nearby Peterboro. The disruption underscored both the strength of abolitionist organizing in the region and the intense opposition such efforts continued to face. The Oneida Institute, near Utica, briefly the center of American abolitionism, accepted both Black and white male enrollees on an equal basis, as did for women the Young Ladies' Domestic Seminary in nearby Clinton. New-York Central College, near Cortland, was an abolitionist institution of higher learning founded by Cyrus Pitt Grosvenor, that accepted all students without prejudice: male and female, white, Black, and Native American, the first college in the United States to do so from the day its doors opened. It was also the first college to have Black professors teaching white students. However, when a Black male faculty member, William G. Allen, married a white student, they had to flee the country for England, never to return.

== Dutch rule ==
=== Initial group of slaves ===
In 1613, Juan (Jan) Rodriguez from Santo Domingo became the first non-indigenous person to settle in what was then known as New Amsterdam. Of Portuguese and West African descent, he was a free man. Juan Rodriguez played a pivotal role in the early trading and cultural exchanges between European settlers and local Indigenous communities.

Systematic slavery began in 1626, when eleven captive Africans arrived on a Dutch West India Company ship in the New Amsterdam harbor. Historian Ira Berlin called them Atlantic Creoles who had European and African ancestry and spoke many languages. In some cases, they attained their European heritage in Africa when European traders conceived children with African women. Some were Africans who were crew members on ships and some came from ports of the Americas. (Note: The Dutch engaged in battles with the Spanish and French as they sought to have a hold on the slave trade and they would keep people of color as war prizes, with no distinction between those who may have been slaves, and those who were free crew members.) Their first names—like Paul, Simon, and John—indicated if they had European heritage. Their last names indicated where they came from, like Portuguese, d'Congo, or d'Angola. People from the Congo or Angola were known for their mechanical skills and docile manners. Six slaves had names that indicated a connection with New Amsterdam, such as Manuel Gerritsen, which he likely received after their arrival in New Amsterdam and to differentiate from repeated first names. Men were laborers who worked the fields, built forts and roads, and performed other forms of labor. According to the principle of partus sequitur ventrem adopted from southern colonies, children born to enslaved women were considered born into slavery, regardless of the ethnicity or status of the father.

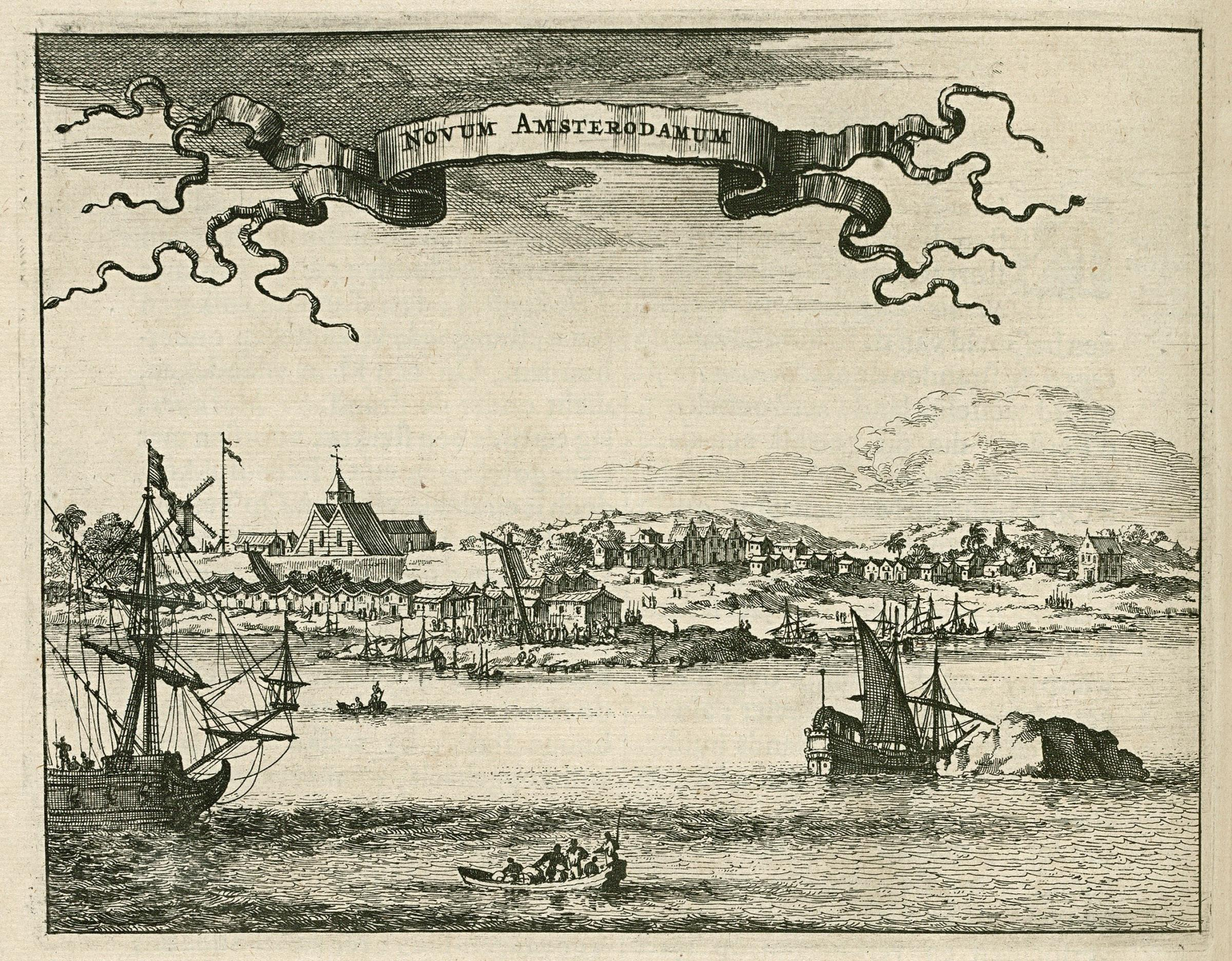
Jacob van Meurs, Novum Amsterodamum [New Amsterdam], 1671. In the center of the picture a man hangs by his middle, suspended by a hook in his ribs, a usual punishment for runaway slaves.

In February 1644, the eleven slaves petitioned Willem Kieft, the director general for the colony, for their freedom. This was a time when there were skirmishes with Native American people and the Dutch wanted blacks to help protect their settlements and did not want the slaves to join the Native Americans. These eleven slaves and their spouses – including Reytory Angola – were granted partial freedom, where they could buy land and a home and earn a wage from their master, and later full freedom. Their children remained in slavery. By 1664, the original eleven slaves, as well as other slaves who had attained half-freedom, for a total of at least 30 black landowners, lived on Manhattan near the Fresh Water Pond.

=== Slave trade ===
For more than two decades after the first shipment, the Dutch West India Company was dominant in the importation of slaves from the coasts of Africa. A number of slaves were imported directly from the company's stations in Angola to New Netherland. This trade supplied the colony with the enslaved labor that underpinned much of its early agricultural and urban development. Members of the prominent Philipse family were among the leading slave traders and slaveholders.

Due to a lack of workers in the colony, it relied upon on African slaves, who were described by the Dutch as "proud and treacherous", a stereotype for African-born slaves. The Dutch West India Company allowed New Netherlanders to trade slaves from Angola for "seasoned" African slaves from the Dutch West Indies, particularly Curaçao, who sold for more than other slaves. They also bought slaves that came from privateers of Spanish slave ships. For instance, La Garce a French privateer, arrived in New Amsterdam in 1642 with Spanish Negroes that were captured from a Spanish ship. Although they claimed to be free, and not African, the Dutch sold them as slaves due to their skin color.

Unlike slaves from other colonies, slaves in New Amsterdam could sue another person whether white or black. Early instances included suits filed for lost wages and damages when a slave's pig was injured by a white man's dog. Slaves could also be sued. (Note: On December 9, 1638, a slave known as Anthony the Portuguese sued a wealthy merchant of possibly mixed ancestry, Anthony Janszoon van Salee, and was awarded reparations for damages caused to his hog by the defendant's dog. In the following year Pedro Negretto successfully sued an English colonist, John Seales, for wages due for tending hogs. Manuel de Reus, a servant of the Director General Willem Kieft, granted a power of attorney to the commas at Fort Orange to collect fifteen guilders in back wages for him from Hendrick Fredricksz." Unique to this colony was how punishment could be given to a Slave. In this case he was suited, "...in 1639 a white merchant Jan Jansen Damen, sued Little Manuel (sometimes called Manuel Minuit) and was in turn sued by Manuel de Reus; both cases were settled out of court.")

=== Partial and full freedom ===
By 1644, some slaves had earned partial freedom, or half-freedom, in New Amsterdam and were able to earn wages. Under Roman-Dutch law they had other rights in the commercial economy, and intermarriage with working-class whites was frequent. Land grant records show that Land of the Blacks was located just north of New Amsterdam. During the English conquest of New Netherland in 1664, the Dutch freed about 40 men and women who had been granted half-slave status. The new freemen had their original land grants finalized and all grants were officially marked as owned by the new freemen.

== English rule ==
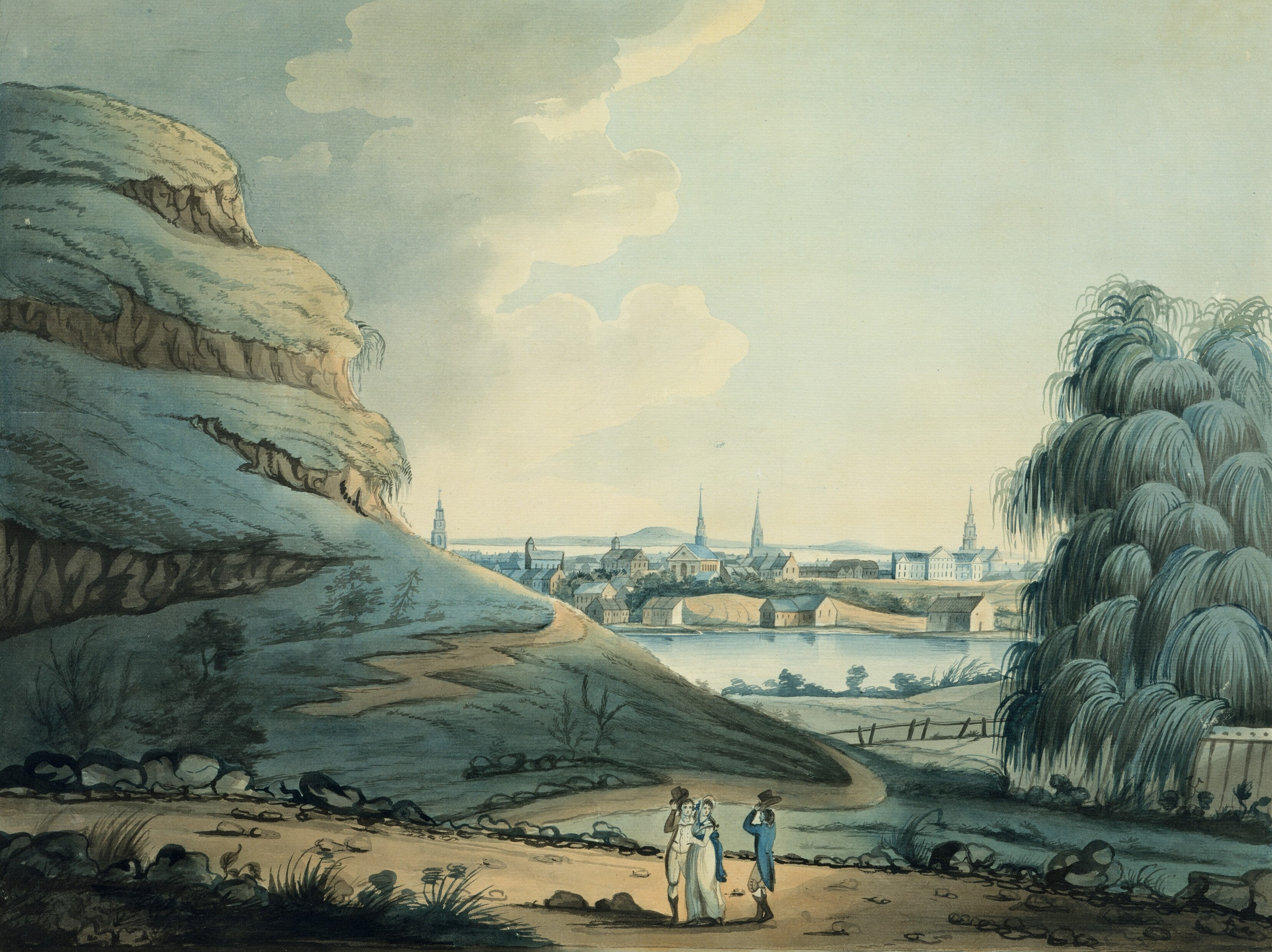
A 1798 watercolor of Fresh Water Pond. Bayard's Mount, a 110-foot (34 m) hillock, is in the left foreground. Prior to being levelled around 1811 it was located near the current intersection of Mott and Grand Streets. New York City, which then extended to a stockade which ran approximately north–southeast from today's Chambers Street and Broadway, is visible beyond the southern shore.

Following the English conquest of New Netherland, which was renamed New York, slaves continued to be imported to the colony. Enslaved Africans performed a wide variety of skilled and unskilled jobs, mostly in the burgeoning port city and surrounding agricultural areas. In 1703, more than 42% of New York City's households held slaves, a percentage higher than in the cities of Boston and Philadelphia, and second only to Charleston in the South. It is one of the highest slavery rates in any of the original North American colonies.

In 1708, the New York Colonial Assembly passed a law entitled "Act for Preventing the Conspiracy of Slaves" which prescribed a death sentence for any slave who murdered or attempted to murder his or her master. This law, one of the first of its kind in Colonial America, was in part a reaction to the murder of William Hallet III and his family in Newtown (Queens).

New York became a hub for the trading of enslaved people. Auctions were typically held in the Meal Market and later the Fly Market and in 1711, a formal slave market was established at the end of Wall Street on the East River, and it operated until 1762. The institution remained fully entrenched until the state passed the Gradual Emancipation Act of 1799, and even after the emancipation of slaves in New York State, the economic and social legacies of slavery bled into society and continued to shape New York's racial dynamics throughout the 19th century.

An act of the New York General Assembly, passed in 1730, the last of a series of New York slave codes, provided that:

Forasmuch as the number of slaves in the cities of New York and Albany, as also within the several counties, towns and manors within this colony, doth daily increase, and that they have oftentimes been guilty of confederating together in running away, and of other ill and dangerous practices, be it therefore unlawful for above three slaves to meet together at any time, nor at any other place, than when it shall happen they meet in some servile employment for their masters' or mistresses' profit, and by their masters' or mistresses' consent, upon penalty of being whipped upon the naked back, at the discretion of any one justice of the peace, not exceeding forty lashes for each offense.

Manors and towns could appoint a common whipper at no more than three shillings per person. Blacks were given the lowest status jobs, the ones the Dutch did not want to perform, like meting out corporal punishment and executions. In 1753, the Assembly provided there should be paid "for every negro, mulatto or other slave, of four years old and upwards, imported directly from Africa, five ounces of Sevil[le] Pillar or Mexico plate [silver], or forty shillings in bills of credit made current in this colony."

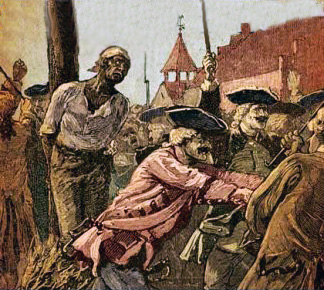
Slave being burned at the stake in N.Y.C. after the 1741 slave insurrection

As in other slaveholding societies, the city was swept by periodic fears of slave revolt. Incidents were misinterpreted under such conditions. In what was called the New York Conspiracy of 1741, city officials believed a revolt had started. Over weeks, they arrested more than 150 slaves and 20 white men, trying and executing several, in the belief they had planned a revolt. Historian Jill Lepore believes whites unjustly accused and executed many blacks in this event.

A remarkable evidence of the European colonists' fear of possible resistance on the part of all enslaved individuals, as well as former slaves and their descendants, irrespective of ancestry, is found in the Census of slaves, conducted in the Province of New York in 1755. In the published record, a long list of enslaved individuals in Oyster Bay (a town on Long Island) is followed by an additional list of "free Negroes Melattoes [people of Afro-European ancestry] and Mustees [Mestizo] Resideing within ye Township of Oysterbay that may probably Be Likely In case of Insurrections To be as Mischevious as ye Slaves." (Free individuals were not supposed to be reported for the Census; a local militia captain supplied it on his own initiative, with the expectation "that ye Other Captains in Oysterbay will acquaint Your Honour [governor of New York] of those Resideing in ye Other parts of ye Township.")

== American Revolution ==
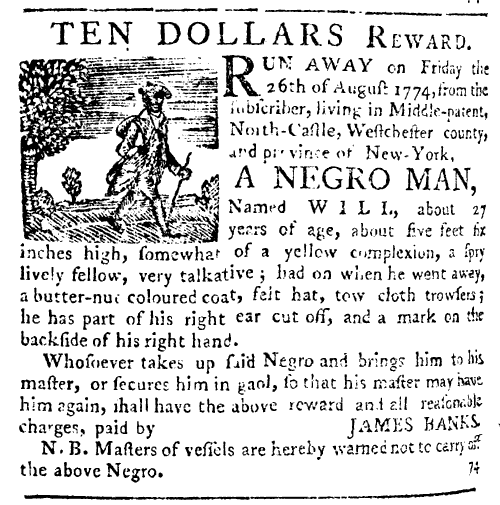
Runaway slave advertisement (1774)

African Americans fought on both sides in the American Revolution.Some were motivated by the hope of gaining freedom or improving their social status, carefully weighing the risks and rewards of joining either the British or Patriot forces. Many slaves chose to fight for the British, as they were promised freedom by General Guy Carleton in exchange for their service. After the British occupied New York City in 1776, slaves escaped to their lines for freedom. The black population in New York grew to 10,000 by 1780, and the city became a center of free blacks in North America. The fugitives included Deborah Squash and her husband Harvey, slaves of George Washington, who escaped from his plantation in Virginia and reached freedom in New York.

In 1781, the state of New York offered slaveholders a financial incentive to assign their slaves to the military, with the promise of freedom at war's end for the slaves. In 1783, black men made up one-quarter of the rebel militia in White Plains, who were to march to Yorktown, Virginia, for the last engagements. Many of these men saw military service as both a path to freedom and a way to assert their rights as citizens.

By the Treaty of Paris (1783), the United States required that all American property, including slaves, be left in place, but General Guy Carleton followed through on his commitment to the freedmen. When the British evacuated from New York, they transported 3,000 Black Loyalists on ships to Nova Scotia (now Maritime Canada), as recorded in the Book of Negroes at the National Archives of Great Britain and the Black Loyalists Directory at the National Archives at Washington. With British support, in 1792 a large group of these Black Britons left Nova Scotia to create an independent colony in Sierra Leone.

== Gradual abolition ==
In 1781, the state legislature voted to free those slaves who had fought for three years with the rebels or were regularly discharged during the Revolution. In 1785, Aaron Burr introduced a bill in the state legislature for immediate emancipation that was defeated 33–13. A more limited bill was soon introduced, providing for gradual emancipation, but restricting voting, prohibiting intermarriage and black testimony against whites. It was also defeated, 27–17.

By 1790, one in three blacks in New York state were free. Especially in areas of concentrated population, such as New York City, they organized as an independent community, with their own churches, benevolent and civic organizations, and businesses that catered to their interests.

Meanwhile, some enslaved people gained freedom through manumission but records in the collection of the Museum of the City of New York from between 1785 and 1809 depict how many manumissions placed conditions on obtaining freedom. For example, a woman named Hannah, manumitted by Aquia Giles in 1796, was required "to behave with fidelity and zeal in my service" for the following six years, while her five-year-old daughter was to remain enslaved until 1820. The 1799 Gradual Abolition Act refused to allow immediate freedom to the enslaved. The act declared that children born to enslaved parents after July 4, 1799, would be obligated until a man turns 28 and a woman turns 25.

In 1804, Captain William Helm, a Virginian, settled first in Sodus Bay and then in Bath with about 40 slaves, in an unsuccessful attempt to implant the plantation system in New York State.

Starting in the 1830s, and particularly between 1850 and 1860, following passage of the Fugitive Slave Act of 1850, professional bounty hunters, vigilance committees, and the Underground Railroad could be found in New York. Abolitionist leaders such as David Ruggles, black and white, helped fugitive slaves escape to Canada or safer locations. One famous abolitionist leader and writer who was helped by Ruggles was Frederick Douglass. The cause was aided by white abolitionists such as William Lloyd Garrison and Sydney Howard Gay. Harriet Tubman made at least two trips to New York as a "captain" of the Underground Railroad.

Black Population in New York, 1790–1860
Census year	1790	1800	1810	1820	1830	1840	1850	1860
Total Black residents	25,978	31,320	40,350	39,367	44,945	50,031	49,069	49,005
Free Black people	4,654	10,417	25,333	29,279	44,870	50,027	49,069	49,005
Blacks living in slavery	21,324	20,903	15,017	10,088	75	4	-	-
Source: Gibson, Campbell; Jung, Kay (September 2002). "Table 47. New York - Race and Hispanic Origin: 1790 to 1990" (PDF). Historical Census Statistics on Population Totals By Race and Hispanic Origin for The United States, Regions, Divisions, and States. U.S. Census Bureau.

== Conversion to indentured servitude ==
Although there was movement towards abolition of slavery, the legislature took steps to characterize indentured servitude for blacks in a way that redefined slavery in the state. Slavery was important economically, both in New York City and in agricultural areas, such as Brooklyn. In 1799, the legislature passed the Act for the Gradual Abolition of Slavery. It freed no living slave. It declared children of slaves born after July 4, 1799, to be legally free, but the children had to serve an extended period of indentured servitude: to the age of 28 for males and to 25 for females. Slaves born before that date were redefined as indentured servants and could not be sold, but they had to continue their unpaid labor.

From 1800 to 1827, white and black abolitionists worked to end slavery and attain full citizenship in New York. During this time, there was a rise in white supremacy, which was at odds with the increased anti-slavery efforts of the early 19th century. Peter Williams Jr., an influential black abolitionist and minister, encouraged other blacks to "by a strict obedience and respect to the laws of the land, form an invulnerable bulwark against the shafts of malice" to better the chances of freedom and a better life.

African Americans' participation as soldiers in defending the state during the War of 1812 added to public support for their full rights to freedom. In 1817, the state freed all slaves born before July 4, 1799 (the date of the gradual abolition law), to be effective in 1827. It continued with the indenture of children born to slave mothers until their 20s, as noted above. Because of the gradual abolition laws, there were children still bound in apprenticeships when their parents were free. This encouraged African-American anti-slavery activists.

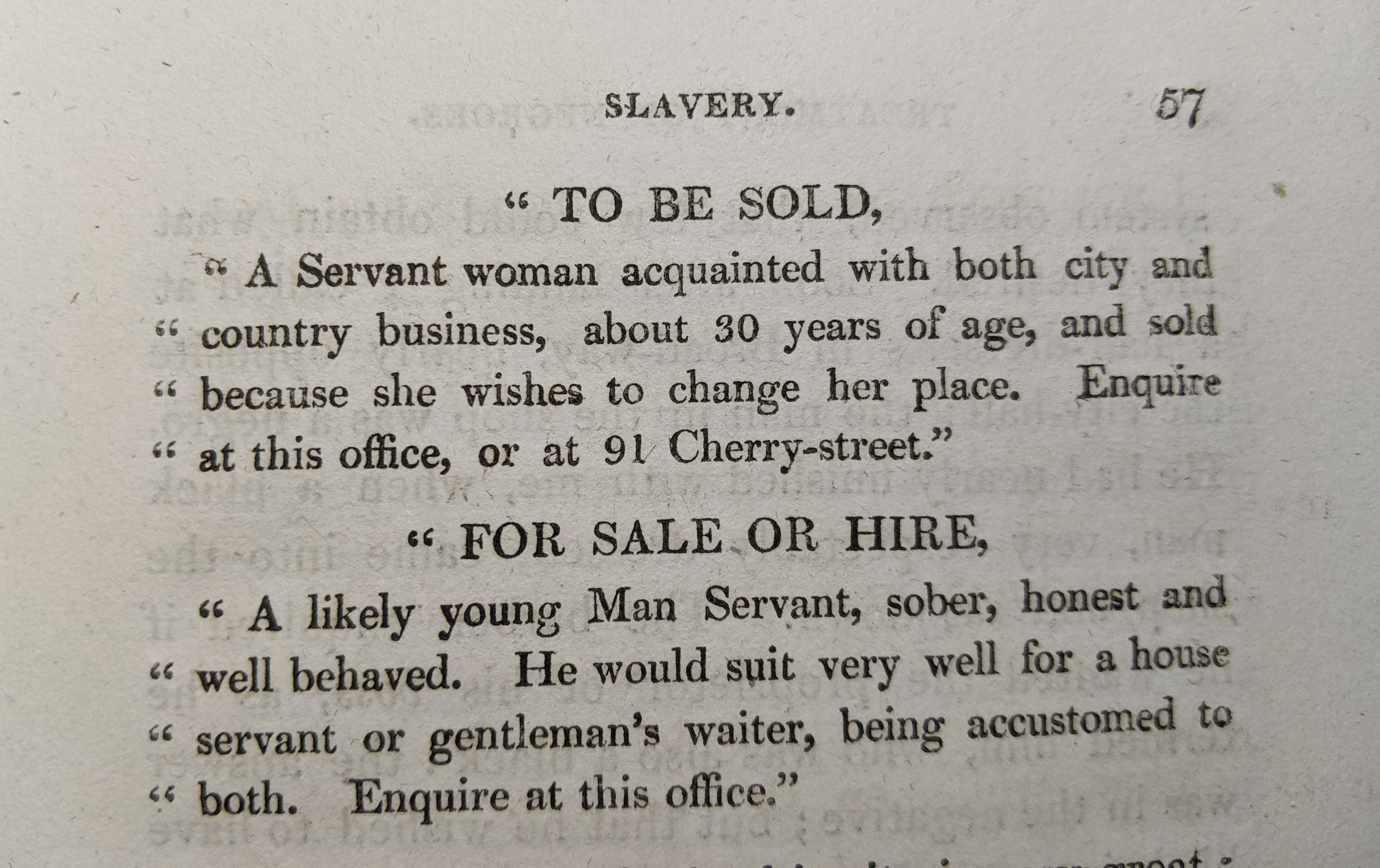
Advertisements for slaves in the New York Daily Advertiser in 1817, as reproduced in Henry Bradshaw Fearon's Sketches of America (1818)

In Sketches of America (1818), British author Henry Bradshaw Fearon, who visited the young United States on a fact-finding mission to inform Britons considering emigration, described the situation in New York City as he found it in August 1817:

New York is called a "free state:" that it may be so so theoretically, or when compared with its southern neighbors; but if, in England, we saw in the Times newspaper such advertisements as the following [see image to right], we should conclude that freedom from slavery existed only in words.

== Full freedom in 1827 ==
On July 5, 1827, the African-American community celebrated final emancipation in the state with a parade through New York City. A distinctive Fifth of July celebration was chosen over July 4, because the national holiday was not seen as meant for blacks, as Frederick Douglass stated later in his famous "What to the Slave Is the Fourth of July?" speech of July 5, 1852.

The memoirs of Daniel M. Tredwell, a native New Yorker who kept a diary beginning in 1838, include his recollections of formerly enslaved people associated with the family's Long Island homestead:

The old slave quarters at our homestead survived to our day, and were located about four hundred feet in the rear of our dwelling. We remember them many years after they had ceased to be used as quarters for negroes, and when they were used as a shelter and stable for horses and cows. The old building had a thatch roof and the clapboards were of oak. It was burned in 1834. Slaves were manumitted in this state in 1827 by an amended act of 1811 which required that those of a certain age should be provided for during life with a home on the estate. We distinctly remember two of them who left home every spring, tramped all summer and invariably came home in winter to board.

== Right to vote ==
New York residents were less willing to give blacks equal voting rights. By the constitution of 1777, voting was restricted to free men who could satisfy certain property requirements for value of real estate. This property requirement disfranchised poor men among both blacks and whites. The reformed Constitution of 1821 eliminated the property requirement for white men, but set a prohibitive requirement of $250 (equivalent to $6,000 in 2025), about the price of a modest house, for black men. This effectively ensured that the vast majority of Black men remained disenfranchised despite nominal constitutional reforms. In the 1826 election, only 16 blacks voted in New York City. In 1846, a referendum to repeal this property requirement was roundly defeated. "As late as 1869, a majority of the state's voters cast ballots in favor of retaining property qualifications that kept New York's polls closed to many blacks. African-American men did not obtain equal voting rights in New York until ratification of the Fifteenth Amendment to the United States Constitution, in 1870."

== Freedom's Journal ==
The first issue of the Freedom's Journal, the first African-American newspaper, on March 16, 1827

Beginning March 16, 1827, John Brown Russwurm published Freedom's Journal, written by and directed to African Americans. Samuel Cornish and John Russwurm were editors of the journal; they used it to appeal to African Americans across the nation. The powerful words published spread rapid positive influence to African Americans who could help establish a new community. The emergence of an African-American journal was a very important movement in New York. It showed that blacks could gain education and be part of literate society. The journal also encouraged political engagement and fostered a sense of pride and unity within the African-American community.

White newspapers published a fictional "Bobalition" print series. This was made in mockery of blacks, using the way an uneducated colored person would pronounce abolition.

== New York City and Brooklyn ==
New York City Mayor Fernando Wood, elected mayor for the first time in 1854, was strongly pro-slavery. He was a leader of the peace Democrats, and in the opposition to the 13th Amendment ending slavery. Just before the Civil War he had seriously proposed to the City Council that the city secede from the Union to form the Free City of Tri-Insula (insula means "island" in Latin), incorporating Manhattan, Staten Island, and Long Island except for pro-Union Brooklyn. The City Council approved the plan, but rescinded its approval three months later, after the Battle of Fort Sumter.

In contrast, Brooklyn was "a sanctuary city before its time", with one of the largest and most politically aware Black communities in the United States. Henry Ward Beecher, brother of Harriet Beecher Stowe, pastor at the Plymouth Church in Brooklyn Heights, was one of the country's most active abolitionists.

== African Burial Ground ==
In 1991, a construction project required an archaeological and cultural study of 290 Broadway in Lower Manhattan to comply with the National Historic Preservation Act of 1966 before construction could begin. During the excavation and study, human remains were found in a former six-acre burial ground for African Americans that dated from the mid-1630s to 1795. It is believed that there are more than 15,000 skeletal remains of colonial New York's free and enslaved blacks. It is the country's largest and earliest burial ground for African-Americans.

This discovery demonstrated the large-scale importance of slavery and African Americans to New York and national history and economy. The African Burial Ground has been designated as a National Historic Landmark and a National Monument for its significance. A memorial and interpretive center for the African Burial Ground have been created to honor those buried and to explore the many contributions of African Americans and their descendants to New York and the nation.

The New York African Burial Ground was rediscovered in the 1990s, and covered an estimated 6 to 6.6 acres and may contain the remains of 10,000-15,000 people, most of them enslaved or freed Africans.

== See also ==
- Abolitionism in the United States
- African Americans in New York City
- African Burial Ground National Monument
- Human trafficking in New York
- New York Conspiracy of 1741
- Rose Butler
- Sylvester Manor
