= Trauma-sensitive yoga =

Yoga in the use of mental therapy

Trauma-sensitive yoga is yoga as exercise, adapted from 2002 onwards for work with individuals affected by psychological trauma. Its goal is to help trauma survivors to develop a greater sense of mind-body connection, to ease their physiological experiences of trauma, to gain a greater sense of ownership over their bodies, and to augment their overall well-being. However, a 2019 systematic review found that the studies to date were not sufficiently robustly designed to provide strong evidence of yoga's effectiveness as a therapy; it called for further research.

== Background ==
=== Psychological trauma and the body ===
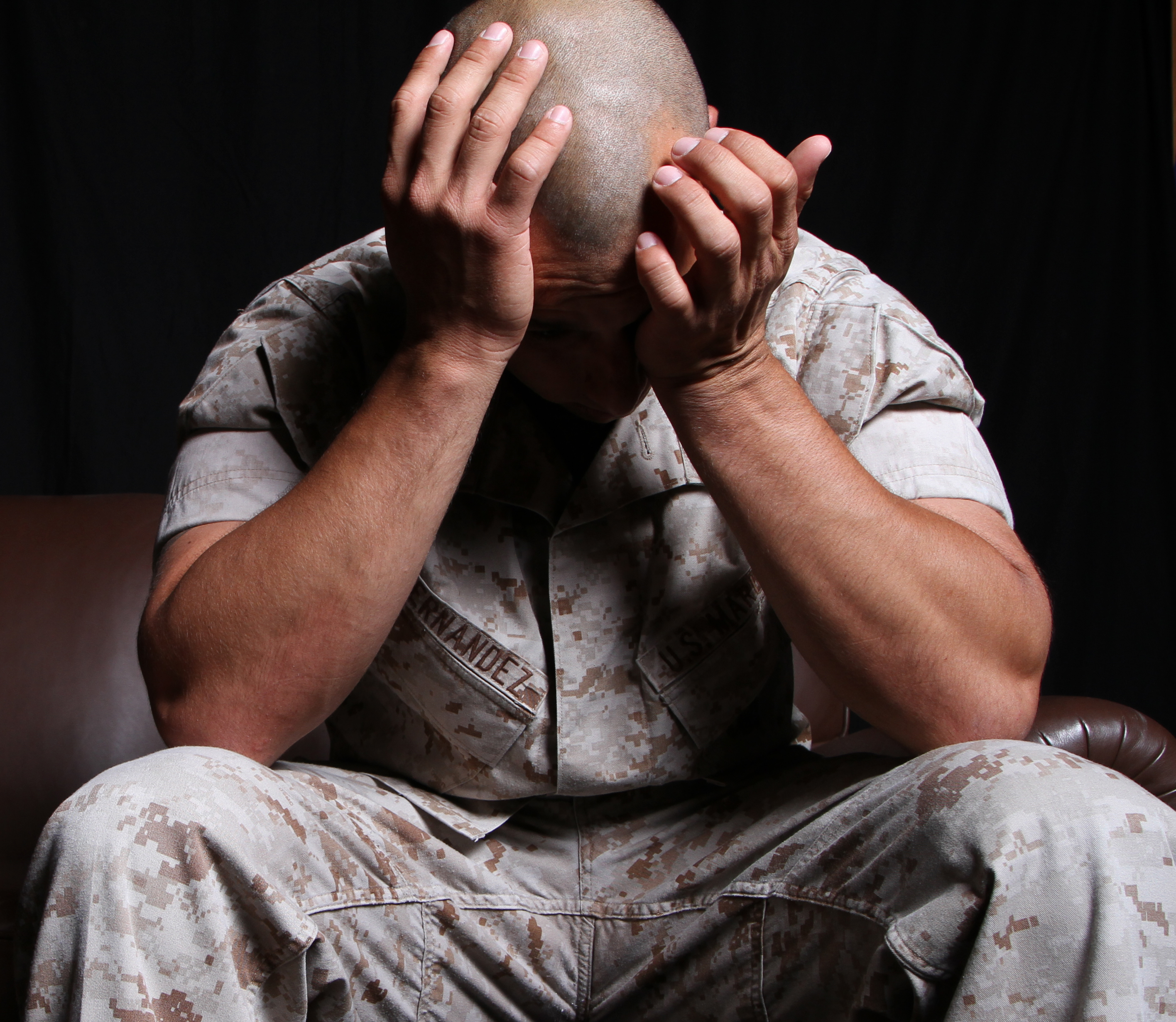
Psychological trauma can follow from the experience of a traumatic event.

Psychological trauma occurs when an individual has experienced a traumatic event which becomes lived and relived in the body and the mind. Trauma can trigger a chronic stress response in the body, which may manifest as an uncontrollable and constant state of heightened arousal and fear. Those with a history of trauma may also interpret this chronic stress response as a threat to their sense of self and relation to the world. Traumatized individuals often have difficulty soothing their overactive internal sensations without relying on external stimuli, such as food, substances, or self-harm. Therefore, psychological trauma is not only associated with psychological disorders such as post-traumatic stress disorder (PTSD), depression, and anxiety, but also with somatic disorders.

Though most evidence-based treatments focus on the psychological effects of trauma first and foremost, attrition rates are still high, possibly due to heightened physiological arousal during the initial stages of exposure therapy. Mind-body approaches offer a complementary method to traditional psychotherapy, allowing traumatized individuals to reconnect with and identify their own physical sensations. Mind-body approaches allow participants to work through their somatic trauma memories and feel safe enough to emotionally and verbally process their traumatic memories. Such approaches involve increasing awareness of, and attention to, bodily sensations, while emphasizing present-moment experience. In this way, they seek to counteract dissociative responses. Finally, mind-body approaches attempt to help traumatized individuals to nurture their bodies. In this way, messages from the physical body may provide information for traumatized individuals about their identities and help individuals regain ownership over their internal responses.

=== Postural yoga ===
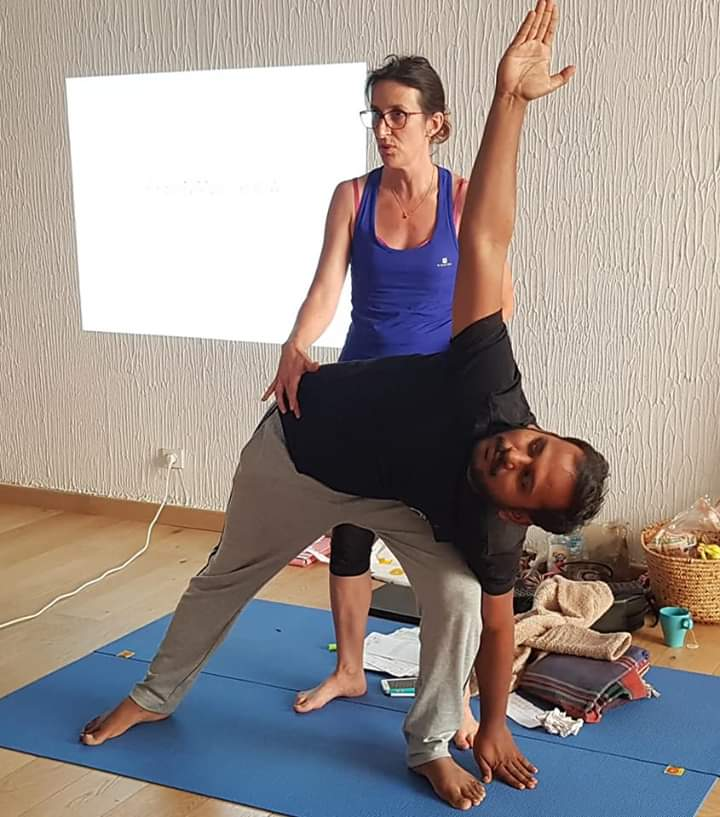
Postural yoga teachers may respectfully adjust a pupil's body hands-on, whereas trauma-sensitive yoga requires giving space to participants.

Postural yoga is a mind-body practice with many forms and styles. It typically includes physical postures called asanas, breathing exercises (pranayama), mindfulness, and meditation.

== Description ==
Trauma-sensitive yoga is a form of yoga as therapy, adapted from modern postural yoga. It was developed at the Justice Resource Institute's Trauma Center in Brookline, Massachusetts, in 2002 by David Emerson and colleagues. It was designed to promote an enhanced feeling of safety for traumatised individuals as they engage in an exercise that is focused on body awareness, which might otherwise be overwhelming for them. It addresses the need for a trauma-informed yoga practice able to identify and mitigate potentially triggering environmental and physiological circumstances, while still providing the psychological and physical benefits that typical yoga practice offers.

Trauma-sensitive yoga has been formulated from five core domains which if nonoptimal could produce adverse side effects among a traumatized population by reminding them of their traumas:

Five Core Domains	Trauma-sensitive yoga	Modern postural yoga
Environment	Space is welcoming, safe, comfortable for vulnerable students	Any suitable space
Physical exercise	Internal sensations important, for feelings of safety, self-acceptance	Achieve particular postures
Assists	Allow space between teacher and pupil	Polite hands-on acceptable
Teacher qualities	Gentle, students stay in control	Often directive
Language	Non-directive instructions	Directive language acceptable

== Key features ==
=== Themes ===
David Emerson has identified four clinically informed key themes in trauma informed yoga practice that have been beneficial for the trauma survivors. These include: 1) experiencing the present moment (which addresses the trauma survivors' predicament of being unable to be fully present in the moment or in their bodies); 2) making choices (which addresses the issue of lack of choice and helplessness that trauma survivors experience during a traumatic event); 3) effective action taking (which addresses the inability to escape the traumatic event that trauma survivors have experienced during the trauma incident), and 4) creating rhythms (which addresses the issue of feeling disconnected that trauma survivors continue to experience in relation to others and themselves). These themes can be integrated by the teacher all in one class, or may be used individually as a focal point of a particular class.

=== Approach ===
Trauma-sensitive yoga is designed to begin gently, with a seated breathing exercise, followed by light movements. While adhering to the conditions of the five core domains (i.e., physical environment, exercises, teaching style, adjustments, and language), the instructor guides the class through a series of physical postures at a level of difficulty fitting the abilities of the participants. In each posture, instructors encourage students to observe their internal sensations, without judgment, and to respond to them compassionately. Throughout, participants are encouraged to make choices for themselves about what feels comfortable and safe in their bodies, and instructors spaciously invite students to modify any posture as needed. The class ends similarly to ordinary postural yoga in a resting pose (Savasana).

Certain conditions remain constant to ensure that participants feel safe, including consistency of room appearance and class structure, instructors' reminders to participants of where the exits are located, and bright lighting so that participants can see their surroundings.

=== Mechanisms ===
Individuals who have experienced psychological trauma often view their internal body sensations as dangerous and foreign, and form destructive habits as a means of coping with their internal experiences. Therefore, instructors strive throughout to create an environment that feels both physically and emotionally safe for the participants, thereby facilitating a healing atmosphere for traumatised individuals. When students feel increased levels of safety and groundedness in their environment, they are said to be at an appropriate mid-range level of arousal for working with their traumas effectively. In that state, they can learn to work with the physiological experiences of trauma in a more adaptive and less destructive manner.

=== Confidentiality ===
Consumers of trauma-sensitive yoga may need to consider the matter of confidentiality as it differs between trauma-sensitive yoga instructors and mental health professionals. Though instructors are most often required to complete at least 200 hours of yoga teacher training with a focus on trauma, confidentiality is typically not the focus of training.

== Evidence ==
Practitioners state that trauma-sensitive yoga should be used only as an alternative and complementary treatment to other evidence-based treatments (e.g., psychotherapy, medication) for trauma. Classes are designed to vary, and thus efficacy has not been established. Trauma-sensitive yoga can be used as a primer to individual psychotherapy, as a means of preparing and grounding the body before uncovering stored traumatic memories, and establishing a traumatized individual's buy-in for treatment. However, a systematic review in 2019 failed to find strong evidence that yoga was effective in PTSD, depression, or anxiety after trauma, as the studies examined were of low quality with a "high risk of bias"; they provided what would if confirmed be strongly beneficial effects with effect sizes in the range of ds=0.40—1.06. The reviewers called for further studies with "more rigorous design". Trauma-sensitive yoga may be more readily accepted by military veterans than cognitive processing therapy.
