= JRI =

JRI may refer to:

- James Richardson International, a Canadian agriculture and food industry company
- Justice Reform Initiative, an Australian campaign based in Sydney
- Justice Resource Institute, a Massachusetts-based non-profit agency
