= The Lifestyle =

- Directed by: David Schisgall
- Produced by: Dan Cogan
- Starring: Dant'e Amore; Wild Bill Goodwin; Robert McGinley
- Cinematography: Peter Hawkins
- Edited by: Andrew Hafitz
- Music by: Byron Estep; Eddie Sperry
- Production companies: Good Machine; Swinging T Productions
- Distributed by: Seventh Art Releasing
- Release date: April 17, 1999
- Running time: 78 minutes
- Country: United States
- Language: English
- Box office: $85,000

The Lifestyle is a 1999 American documentary about swinging in the United States.

== See also ==
- American Swing
- Swingtown
- Plato's Retreat
- Open marriage
