= Our Idiot Brother =

2011 film by Jesse Peretz

- Theatrical release poster
- Directed by: Jesse Peretz
- Screenplay by: Evgenia Peretz; David Schisgall
- Story by: Evgenia Peretz; David Schisgall; Jesse Peretz
- Produced by: Anthony Bregman; Peter Saraf; Marc Turtletaub
- Starring: Paul Rudd; Elizabeth Banks; Zooey Deschanel; Emily Mortimer; Steve Coogan; Hugh Dancy; Kathryn Hahn; Rashida Jones; Shirley Knight; T.J. Miller; Adam Scott
- Cinematography: Yaron Orbach
- Edited by: Andrew Mondshein; Jacob Craycroft
- Music by: Eric D. Johnson; Nathan Larson
- Production companies: Big Beach Films; Likely Story
- Distributed by: The Weinstein Company
- Release dates: January 22, 2011 (Sundance); August 26, 2011 (United States)
- Running time: 90 minutes
- Country: United States
- Language: English
- Budget: $5 million
- Box office: $25.9 million

Our Idiot Brother is a 2011 American comedy-drama film directed by Jesse Peretz and starring Paul Rudd, Elizabeth Banks, Zooey Deschanel and Emily Mortimer. The script was written by Evgenia Peretz and David Schisgall based on Jesse and Evgenia Peretz's story, and tells the story of a dimwitted but idealistic and well-meaning man who intrudes and wreaks havoc in his three sisters' lives.

The film was co-produced by Anthony Bregman, Peter Saraf and Marc Turtletaub. It premiered at the 2011 Sundance Film Festival and was given wide release by The Weinstein Company on August 26, 2011. The film received mostly positive reviews, with critics praising the story and Rudd's performance, but criticizing the uneven script.

== Plot ==
Ned Rochlin, a biodynamic agriculture farmer living with his girlfriend, Janet, gets tricked and arrested for attempting to sell pot to a uniformed police officer. Ned has three sisters: Miranda, a journalist hoping to get her first major article with Vanity Fair and harboring feelings for her neighbor Jeremy; Natalie, a hipster living with her girlfriend Cindy and other roommates; and Liz, a housewife married to Dylan, a documentary filmmaker who is inattentive; they strictly control their son River, unable to express himself or choose his activities, putting him in interpretive dance class when he longs to take taekwondo.

Paroled, Ned discovers Janet has ditched him for mellow Billy, and no longer wishes him on the farm. Billy suggests he may be able to rent the goat barn out back. Initially staying at his mother's, Ned asks to stay with Liz. While bunking in River's room, he is told to help with Dylan's documentary about Belarusian ballerina Tatiana.

One day, Ned is told to watch the car while Dylan interviews Tatiana. When a policeman asks him to move it, Ned runs upstairs for the keys and discovers Dylan naked with Tatiana. Dylan claims that he was only making her "comfortable". He is later kicked out of Liz's place after River announces Ned's legal trouble at an important school admission interview.

Miranda reluctantly asks Ned to chauffeur while she interviews Lady Arabella, but is legally unable to pry into her scandalous past, while he charms Arabella. At her benefit dinner, she shares personal details of her life with him.

Staying with Miranda, Ned mentions Dylan's nude interview, and she deduces he is cheating on Liz. Realizing he has the details she needs about Arabella, she forces him to tell her. Ashamed, Ned returns to the farm; Janet does not let him rent the barn or leave with his dog, “Willie Nelson”.

Ned has lunch with Jeremy, who explains that Miranda is too bossy for him. She is hurt when he mentions the conversation and reveals her thoughts on Jeremy, leading to a fight between them.

Miranda and Nat try to tell Liz about Dylan's affair, which leads to an argument about all their personal lives. Liz confronts Dylan, then divorces him.

Miranda takes Ned to verify the details of her article, but he will not sign a release as Arabella spoke to him privately. The company lawyer deems the article unpublishable, and Miranda kicks Ned out.

Ned attends a self-help meeting with Natalie. Her friend Christian is attracted to her but holds back as he knows of her lesbian relationship. When Ned tells him she is bisexual, he makes a move and they have sex. Natalie later confides to Ned that she is pregnant.

Ned asks Cindy, a lawyer, how to get custody of Willie Nelson, and she suggests they just take him back. At that point, Ned is staying with Nat, who lies about having told her about Christian (and the pregnancy). As Cindy and Ned sneak onto the farm to retrieve Willie, when he mentions Nat's infidelity, she angrily calls her from inside the house. Janet and Billy return and catches them before they get Willie Nelson. Cindy, in midst of yelling at Nat over the phone, leaves without Ned.

Ned naively tells his parole officer, Omar, that he smoked marijuana recently. At the family dinner, Ned's sisters blame him for their troubles, driving Ned to angrily call them out for their selfishness. Omar arrives to reluctantly take Ned into custody. Although his family posts his bail, he opts to stay in to keep away from them. They go get Willie Nelson from Janet to cheer him up. Although she once again refuses, Billy freely gives them the dog. Reunited with his dog, Ned is motivated to leave prison.

Weeks later, at lunch with Ned, his sisters all have improvements in their lives: Nat decides to keep her baby and Cindy plans to accompany Nat to her prenatal appointments; Miranda has started a relationship with Jeremy, and Liz is dating and letting River be himself. Ned and Billy have opened up a small homemade candle shop. When Ned finds Willie Nelson playing with another dog, her owner (Amy) says she is "Dolly Parton", he tells her his dog is "Willie Nelson", and they both smile.

== Cast ==
- Paul Rudd as Nedrick "Ned" Rochlin
- Elizabeth Banks as Miranda Rochlin
- Zooey Deschanel as Natalie "Nat" Rochlin
- Emily Mortimer as Liz Rochlin Anderson
- Steve Coogan as Dylan Anderson
- Hugh Dancy as Christian Smith
- Kathryn Hahn as Janet Ziebell
- Rashida Jones as Cindy Harris
- Shirley Knight as Ilene Rochlin
- T.J. Miller as Billy Orwin
- Adam Scott as Jeremy Horne
- Janet Montgomery as Lady Arabella Galloway
- Sterling Brown as Parole Officer Omar Coleman
- Matthew Mindler as River Byng
- Lydia Haug as Tatiana
- Wrenn Schmidt as Beth
- Bob Stephenson as Officer Washburn
- Katie Aselton as Amy
- Christopher Evan Welch as Robbie (Uncredited)

== Production ==
=== Development ===
The story was conceived by Jesse Peretz and his sister Evgenia, who had written a screenplay together before but were unable to finance the project. They greatly enjoyed working together though, so they decided to draft another story, this time "a bit more commercial" and with characters in their 30s. They planned to cast actors with whom Peretz was already friends, and created the main character with Paul Rudd in mind. The script was written by Evgenia Peretz and her husband David Schisgall, and was completed by December 2009 under the original title of My Idiot Brother.

Peretz brought the script to producer Anthony Bregman, with whom he had worked on the 2007 film The Ex. According to Bregman, "I was always looking for something to do with him [Peretz] and he came to me with this script. It was fantastic." Bregman was familiar with producers Peter Saraf and Marc Turtletaub and had previously attempted to collaborate with the two. He sent them the script in April 2010 and Saraf said that he "loved it and was eager to work with both of them [Bregman and Peretz]." The film was co-financed by Bregman's production company, "Likely Story" and Saraf and Turtletaub's company, "Big Beach", with a budget of less than $10 million. The project developed unusually rapidly for an independent film; Bregman remarked in September 2010, "We worked on it for a few months and then it came together really quickly for the world of independent film. [...] We will have a cut of the film less than a year after we saw this script." Saraf said, "This movie will set a record for how quickly it came together: from the time I first read the script to the time we wrapped the shoot was four months."

=== Casting ===
Paul Rudd signed on to play the lead role even before Saraf and Turtletaub had picked up the film. The principal cast was announced in early June, including the roles played by Rudd, Elizabeth Banks, Emily Mortimer, Zooey Deschanel, and Rashida Jones. Additional cast members including Hugh Dancy, Kathryn Hahn, Shirley Knight, Janet Montgomery and Steve Coogan were announced in late July.

=== Filming ===
Principal photography began in July 2010 and took a total of 30 days over a six-week span. Filming took place in and around New York City, with a 30% tax credit from the New York State Governor's Office for Motion Picture and Television Development. Various locations were used in Brooklyn and Manhattan as well as Upstate New York; specific locations included Washington Heights, Ossining, New York, Cold Spring, New York, The Hamptons, Hotel Chelsea and Pete's Candy Store in Williamsburg. Post production was completed in Big Beach's New York offices.

== Reception ==
Our Idiot Brother received positive reviews from critics. On Rotten Tomatoes it has an approval rating of 70% based on 143 reviews, with an average rating of 6.27/10. The site's critical consensus reads: "It's decidedly uneven, but like Paul Rudd's performance in the title role, Our Idiot Brother is too charming to resist." On Metacritic the film has a score of 60 out of 100 based on 39 critics, indicating "mixed or average reviews". Audiences surveyed by CinemaScore gave the film a grade "C+" on a scale of A+ to F.

Roger Ebert of the Chicago Sun-Times gave the film 3 out of 4 stars, and wrote: "It's refreshing, this late in the summer, to find a hot weather comedy that doesn't hate its characters and embed them in scatology and sexual impossibilities."

== Home media ==
Our Idiot Brother was released on DVD and Blu-ray Disc on November 29, 2011.
