= David Schisgall =

American documentary filmmaker and writer

- Born: U.S.
- Occupations: Director, Writer, Producer
- Years active: 1999–present
- Website: dschisgall.com

David Schisgall is an American documentary filmmaker and writer based in Brooklyn, New York. His most recent project is the 2025 Peacock docuseries Anatomy of Lies.

== Career ==
Earlier in his career Schisgall was an associate of Errol Morris, working on A Brief History of Time, Fast, Cheap & Out of Control, Mr. Death, and other projects. His directorial debut, The Lifestyle (1999), explored suburban swinging culture. During the 2000s, he served as a conflict reporter for MTV, covering the Second Intifada in Israel/Palestine, the war in Iraq, and the civil war in Colombia for True Life and other programs, reaching millions of young viewers with insights into America’s conflicts abroad. In 2004, he received the Edward R. Murrow Award for his film about Iraq. Following this, he produced Operation Filmmaker (2007), focusing on collaboration during wartime Iraq.

In 2007, Schisgall directed and produced Very Young Girls, a documentary about the commercial sexual exploitation of young women in New York City. Activists in the space called it "the film which launched a movement." He also developed episodes of This American Life for television in 2007–2008. He co-wrote the screenplay for Our Idiot Brother (2011), a comedy directed by Jesse Peretz. Another project, Theo Who Lived (2016), documented journalist Theo Padnos’s captivity by an Al Qaeda affiliate in Syria. In 2020, Schisgall directed and produced The Oil War, which explored America’s military involvement in the Middle East based on the works of Col. Andrew Bacevich.

Schisgall has served as an Adjunct Faculty member at the Arthur L. Carter Journalism Institute at New York University.

== Personal life ==
Schisgall is married to Evgenia Peretz, a writer for Vanity Fair.

== Selected filmography ==
Year	Title	Contribution	Note
2024	Anatomy of Lies	Director and executive producer	Documentary series
2020	The Oil War	Director and producer	Documentary
2016	Theo Who Lived	Director and writer	Documentary
2011	Our Idiot Brother	Writer	Feature film
2010	Five Weddings and a Felony	Producer	Documentary
2007	Very Young Girls	Director and producer	Documentary
2007	Operation Filmmaker	Producer	Documentary
2003-2004	True Life	Director and Producer	Documentary series
1999	The Lifestyle	Director	Documentary

== Awards and nominations ==
Year	Result	Award	Category	Work	Ref.
2008	Nominated	Warsaw Film Festival	Best Documentary	Very Young Girls	
2005	Won	Edward R. Murrow Award	Best News Documentary	True Life: I'm Living in Iraq	
