= Justice for Victims of Trafficking Act of 2015 =

United States law

- Long title: Justice for Victims of Trafficking Act of 2015
- Acronyms (colloquial): JVTA
- Enacted by: the 114th United States Congress
- Effective: May 29, 2015

Citations
- Public law: 114-22
- Statutes at Large: 129 Stat. 227

Codification
- Acts amended: Adam Walsh Child Protection and Safety Act, Child Abuse Prevention and Treatment Act, Crime Control Act of 1990, Homeland Security Act of 2002, Missing Children's Assistance Act, Omnibus Crime Control and Safe Streets Act of 1968, Runaway and Homeless Youth Act, Sex Offender Registration and Notification Act, Trafficking Victims Protection Act of 2000, Trafficking Victims Protection Re-Authorization Act of 2005, Victims of Child Abuse Act of 1990, Victims of Crime Act of 1984, Workforce Innovation and Opportunity Act.
- Titles amended: 6, 18, 22, 28, 29, 31, 34, 39, 42
- U.S.C. sections amended: 6 USC § 187, 6 USC § 473, 6 USC § 641-44 18 USC § 1591, 18 USC § 1594-95, 18 USC § 2421, 18 USC § 2423, 18 USC § 2516, 18 USC § 3014, 18 USC § 3156, 18 USC § 3583, 18 USC § 3771 22 USC § 7102-03, 22 USC § 7105 28 USC § 524, 28 USC § 566 29 USC § 3194 31 USC § 312, 31 USC § 5340, 31 USC § 9703, 31 USC § 9705 34 USC § 20704, 34 USC § 20709, 34 USC § 20710, 34 USC § 20711, 34 USC § 20931, 34 USC § 21301-308 39 USC § 2003 42 USC § 3755, 42 USC § 3796dd, 42 USC § 5106a, 42 USC § 5106g, 42 USC § 5714-23, 42 USC § 5714-41, 42 USC § 5773, 42 USC § 5780, 42 USC § 10601, 42 USC § 13001a, 42 USC § 13002, 42 USC § 14044b

Legislative history
- Introduced in the United States Senate by John Cornyn (R–TX) on January 13, 2015; Passed the Senate on April 22, 2015 (Yeas: 99; Nays: 0); Passed the House on May 19, 2015 (Yeas: 420; Nays: 3); Signed into law by President Barack Obama on May 29, 2015

The Justice for Victims of Trafficking Act of 2015 is an Act of Congress introduced in the Senate on January 13, 2015, and signed into law by United States President Barack Obama on May 29, 2015. It is also known as the JVTA. Broadly speaking, it aimed to expand services for survivors of human trafficking as well as to strengthen and empower law enforcement and first responders.

== Bill's Background and Introduction ==
The 114th Congress quickly and vigorously took up the issue of human trafficking, generating twelve bills in the first couple weeks of the new session. The JVTA incorporates provisions from ten of those twelve bills: H.R. 159 (Stop Exploitation of Trafficking Act of 2015), H.R. 181 (Justice for Victims of Trafficking Act of 2015), H.R. 246 (To improve the response to victims of child sex trafficking), H.R. 285 (SAVE Act of 2015), H.R. 350 (Human Trafficking Prevention, Intervention, and Recovery Act of 2015), H.R. 357 (Human Trafficking Prevention Act), H.R. 398 (Trafficking Awareness Training for Health Care Act of 2015), H.R. 460 (Human Trafficking Detection Act of 2015), H.R. 468 (Enhancing Services for Runaway and Homeless Victims of Youth Trafficking Act of 2015), and H.R. 469 (Strengthening Child Welfare Response to Trafficking Act of 2015). The bills built on momentum from bills considered but not passed in the 113th Congress. They largely focused on sex trafficking.

The JVTA was introduced by Senator John Cornyn and originally co-sponsored by Senators Amy Klobuchar, Ron Wyden, Mark Steven Kirk, Orrin Hatch, Lindsey Graham, Christopher Coons, Tom Udall, Daniel Coats, Mike Crapo, John Hoeven, Robert Casey Jr., and Dianne Feinstein.

The bill was not a reauthorization of the Trafficking Victims Protection Act (TVPA), though it did modify some of the TVPA's provisions. The TVPA is the original, landmark piece of U.S. legislation that established human trafficking as a federal crime, enumerated penalties for those convicted, mandated that convicted traffickers pay their victims restitution, It created the State Department's specialized Office to Monitor and Combat Trafficking in Persons, and established the T Visa for non-citizen trafficking victims who need immigration relief and services. The TVPA must be regularly re-authorized to provide continued funding, but the reauthorizations often include definitional changes, legal clarifications, or the establishments of new pilot programs.

In its findings ahead of the JVTA's passage, Congress noted that, according to the Federal Bureau of Investigation (FBI), human trafficking was a rapidly growing industry and already the third-largest criminal enterprise globally. Representatives seemed especially concerned about victims' vulnerabilities, including due to youth and unstable homes, and about the lack of attention to interventions on the demand/buyer side.

== Controversy ==
Human trafficking is typically a bipartisan issue. However, the JVTA became embroiled in a controversy related to the highly controversial and partisan issue of abortion. Though the word "abortion" was never mentioned in the bill, it stated that the money in the Domestic Trafficking Victims' Fund would be subject to sections 506 and 507 of division H of the Consolidated Appropriations Act, 2014, meaning that the funds would have been subject to the Hyde Amendment. The Hyde Amendment is a legislative provision barring the use of federal funds to pay for abortion except to save the life of the woman, or if the pregnancy arises from incest or rape.

Since the Fund included $5,000 assessments from people convicted of trafficking-related offenses (i.e., fines and fees that are private money), Democrats argued that applying the Hyde Amendment to the Fund would be an expansion of the Hyde Amendment's scope. Democrats also accused Republicans of "trying to pull a fast one" by inserting this provision. Democrats argued Republicans had told them the application of the Hyde Amendment to the Fund was not among the changes to the bill, plus that change was not listed alongside other changes that Republicans had made since the bill had previously been introduced.

Republicans in turn argued that Democrats hadn't read the bill closely enough or that they were being disingenuous. Republican Senator John Cornyn noted the bill had been available to the public for about a month before it was considered by the Judiciary Committee on February 26, 2015, and thus the argument that Republicans had snuck the language into the bill "presupposes that none of their staff briefed the senators on what was in the legislation, that nobody read a 68-page bill and that senators would vote for a bill, much less co-sponsor it, without reading it and knowing what's in it. None of that strikes me as plausible." Republicans also pointed to other legislation that had been passed shortly before, such as the Affordable Care Act and the National Defense Authorization Act, that included similar language.

The Alliance to End Slavery and Trafficking (ATEST), a U.S.-based coalition composed of anti-human trafficking non-profits who work together to advocate for solutions to end modern slavery, urged the Senate to break the partisan gridlock and pass the bill. Senators were ultimately able to reach a compromise: only the federal money in the Fund may be used for health care services. The private fines and fees cannot, which ensures that no money in the Fund will be used to fund abortions. This broke the gridlock and allowed the bill to proceed.

Republicans had also blocked Loretta Lynch's confirmation as Attorney General until after a compromise was reached on the JVTA. Thus, after the Senate passed the JVTA on April 22, it confirmed Loretta Lynch, who was sworn in on April 27, 2015.

== Titles ==
The JVTA has ten titles, which are large, notable subsections of the act. (For example, Title VII of the Civil Rights Act of 1964.) All of the Titles are still part of the JVTA and were therefore passed at the same time. They also address human trafficking in some capacity.

=== Title I -- Justice for Victims of Trafficking ===
This is the longest of the ten titles. It establishes a $5,000 (~$6,447 in 2024) penalty (which expires on September 30, 2019) which is assessed on people convicted of offenses related to human trafficking and sexual abuse. That fine is paid into a fund the JVTA establishes called the "Domestic Trafficking Victims' Fund," which the Department of Justice (DOJ) uses to support victims of trafficking. The U.S. government matches the amount generated by the $5,000 fines. As part of a political compromise to ensure the bill passed, Congress agreed that none of the private money in the Fund may be used for health or medical expenses (to ensure none of the Fund's money is used for abortions). (See "Controversy" section above for more information.)

The Title clarifies that victims who are U.S. citizens or lawful permanent residents should not be denied services simply because they have not received a certification from Health and Human Services (HHS) or the Secretary of Homeland Security, the way that non-citizen victims of human trafficking must in order to access services and benefits.

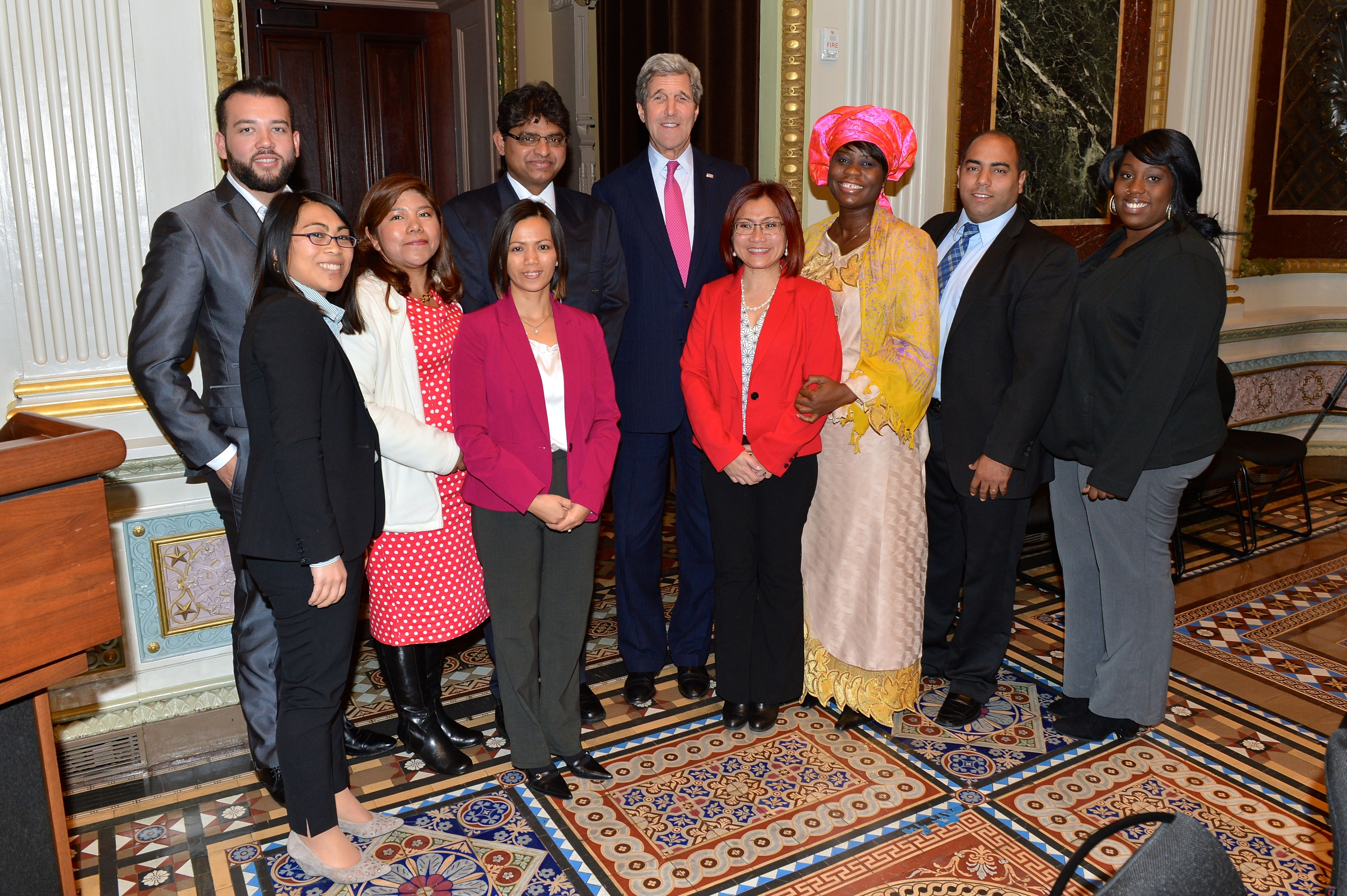
Former U.S. Secretary of State John Kerry posing for a photo with the U.S. Advisory Council on Human Trafficking in 2016.

It also creates a block grant program (financed by the Domestic Trafficking Victims' Fund) to pay for efforts aimed at deterring domestic child sex trafficking. This includes funding for efforts that establish or expand: training programs for professionals combating human trafficking such as health care officials, police, prosecutors, and child welfare officials; law enforcement units or task forces geared at investigating instances of child sex trafficking and rescuing survivors; law enforcement units to help track down runaway and homeless youth; and court programs for trafficking victims. It clarifies that grant awards may be used to fund programs that identify and assist victims of child pornography, including by paying for investigation expenses such as wiretaps.

This Title also adds to the TVPA's definition of trafficking by adding "patronizing, or soliciting" to the sex trafficking statute to clarify that those who purchase sex acts from trafficking victims can be prosecuted as trafficking offenders. (The full definition now includes anyone who "recruits, entices, harbors, transports, provides, obtains, advertises, maintains, patronizes, or solicits" someone over 18 by using force, fraud, or coercion, or someone under 18, for the purposes of commercial sex.) It requires DOJ to direct pre-existing Innocence Lost National Initiative task forces to target those who buy sex acts from trafficking victims. It also requires law enforcement officers to file a recent photo with all reports they submit to the FBI's National Crime Information Center (NCIC) as well as for the National Center for Missing and Exploited Children (NCMEC) to be notified every time a child is reported missing from a foster home or childcare institution. The Title also criminalizes knowingly selling advertising for sexual services provided by minors or trafficking victims.

It clarifies that victims have the right to be notified of plea bargains and deferred prosecution agreements, as well as that, in cases where district courts have denied victims their rights, victims' petitions to courts of appeals are to be reviewed under the ordinary appellate standard of review (legal error or abuse of discretion) rather than the higher standard (clear and indisputable error) that is typically used in such appeals.

Finally, the Title establishes the United States Advisory Council on Human Trafficking, which is composed of 8-14 survivors of human trafficking. The Council is designed to assess U.S. policies and programs and provide advice and recommendations to the federal government to ensure that its policies and programs align with best practices in the anti-human trafficking field. The Council generates an annual report detailing its findings.

=== Title II -- Combating Human Trafficking ===
This Title increases training about and services for victims of trafficking who are runaway and homeless youth. It requires the Interagency Task Force to Monitor and Combat Trafficking (established under the TVPA) to create an electronic report on the research and academic literature related to trafficking in the United States, including best practices for prevention and deterrence. It mandates trainings on human trafficking for certain federal employees. It also clarifies that victims of trafficking may receive housing assistance via existing grants.

=== Title III -- HERO Act ===
"HERO Act" is short for "Human Exploitation Rescue Operations Act of 2015." This Title direct the Department of Homeland Security to operate a Cyber Crimes Center within U.S. Immigration and Customs Enforcement (ICE) to assist with investigations and provide trainings. Furthermore, it criminalizes knowingly transporting someone with the intent that person engage in illegal commercial sex.

=== Title IV -- Rape Survivor Child Custody ===
This Title directs DOJ to increase grant funding to states that allow mothers to children who were conceived through rape to terminate the rapist's parental rights.

=== Title V -- Military Sex Offender Reporting ===
Title V requires the Secretary of Defense to provide DOJ with sex offender information for soldiers who have served time in military corrections facilities or have been convicted of certain types of crimes.

=== Title VI -- Stopping Exploitation Through Trafficking ===
This Title amends the Omnibus Crime and Control and Safe Streets Act to give preference to Community-Oriented Policing Services (COPS) grant applicants who (1) are in states with safe harbor laws that treat minors who have engaged or attempted to engage in commercial sex as victims, (2) discourage or prohibit prosecuting those victims, and (3) encourage diversion of those victims to service providers. It requires DOJ to expand the data it collects on certain federal trafficking offenses, including information on restitution (whether it was ordered, the amount ordered, and how much was ultimately paid) and demographics of convicted defendants (age, gender, race, country of origin, and description of the role in the offense). The Title required Secretary of Health and Human Services to make grants to fund a National Human Trafficking Hotline. (Sec. 605) This section amends the federal judicial code to authorize the United States Marshals Service to assist state, local, and other federal law enforcement agencies, upon request, in locating and recovering missing children. It also mandated that DOJ implement a National Strategy for Combating Human Trafficking to better integrate federal, state, local, and tribal investigations and prosecutions of human trafficking cases, as well as to improve coordination on cases, annual budget priorities, and assessments of future trends and challenges.

=== Title VII -- Trafficking Awareness Training for Health Care ===
Title VII requires the Health Resources and Services Administration (housed within HHS) to provide a grant to support the development and sharing of best-practices for medical providers to recognize and appropriately respond to victims of trafficking. This includes training health care professionals and having HHS post the best-practices on its website.

=== Title VIII -- Better Response for Victims of Child Sex Trafficking ===
This Title requires state plans developed under the Child Abuse Prevention and Treatment Act to affirm their states are enforcing state laws related to the identification and assessment of reports involving children known to be or suspected of being victims of sex trafficking, as well as that child protective services workers are receiving training on identifying and providing services to such children.

=== Title IX -- Anti-Trafficking Training for Department of Homeland Security Personnel ===
Title IX requires the Department of Homeland Security (DHS) to train and periodically retrain employees of the Transportation Security Administration (TSA), U.S. Customs and Border Protection (CBP), and other relevant personnel on how to effectively discourage, identify, and react to incidents of human trafficking. It requires DHS to generate an annual report on the effectiveness of the training by tracking the number of reported cases of human trafficking and how many of those cases are actually confirmed to be instances of human trafficking. It also authorizes DHS, if requested, to providing training curricula to any state, local, or tribal government or private organization.

=== Title X -- Human Trafficking Survivors Relief and Empowerment Act ===
This Title prioritizes DOJ's Community Oriented Policing Services (COPS) grants going to programs in states with certain preferred policies, such as vacatur laws, rebuttable presumptions that arrests or convictions for offenses related to trafficking are the result of being trafficked, and identity protection for trafficking survivors in public court documents and records.

== Effects ==
As required by the JVTA, the Government Accountability Office (GAO) submitted a report to Congress about the JVTA's implementation one year after President Obama signed it. The Senate held a hearing on the issue on June 28, 2016. The findings were generally positive. In its testimony, the Department of Justice noted increased coordination among investigative agencies, expanded resources to examine and seize assets, and increased payments for survivors under the JVTA. Furthermore, as of May 2016, the Domestic Trafficking Victims' Fund had collected over $100,000. DOJ also announced $44 million worth of grant funding in September 2015 to fund law enforcement capacity-building, services for survivors, and increased research. DOJ awarded $6 million of that to ten grantees to provide specialized services, such as to survivors who are LGBTQ, runaway and homeless youth, and foreign-born. DOJ also provided written guidance to Assistant U.S. Attorneys on updates to the law as a result of the JVTA, as well as training to those attorneys, federal investigators, and financial institutions working on human trafficking cases. DOJ also highlighted the shortcomings in data; under the JVTA, the Bureau of Justice Statistics (BJS) is required to assemble an annual report on the rates of arrests, prosecutions, and convictions for trafficking at the state level. However, in 2016, only about 35% of states were reporting data to the FBI's system. Even in the 2017 report (the most recent published as of March 12, 2019), 14 states had 0 offenses reported (which may mean they are not submitting data on the subject).

Some organizations, such as Human Rights First, suggest that the government has paid insufficient attention to labor trafficking under the JVTA.

Some of the JVTA's provisions are set to expire relatively soon, such as the $5,000 assessment for those convicted of human trafficking (expires on September 30, 2021) and the U.S. Advisory Council on Human Trafficking (expires on September 30, 2020). However, other changes the JVTA implemented, such as a different definition of trafficking and what behaviors trigger criminal liability, will be unaffected and stay in force.

== Additional Reading ==
- Congressional reports: H. Rept. 114-6 - Stop Exploitation Through Trafficking Act of 2015; H. Rept. 114-7 - Justice for Victims of Trafficking Act of 2015; H. Rept. 114-9 - Human Trafficking Prevention, Intervention, and Recovery Act of 2015; and S. Rept. 114-46 - Human Trafficking Detection Act of 2015.
- United States v. Kelley, No. 16-2696 (8th Cir. 2017): The district court did not clearly err in determining that the defendant (because of his education and background) would, at some point in the future, be able to pay the $5,000 assessment mandated under the Justice for Victims of Trafficking Act of 2015 and thus was not indigent within the meaning of the Act.
- Rep. Ann Wagner & Rachel Wagley McCann, Prostitutes or Prey? The Evolution of Congressional Intent in Combatting Sex Trafficking, 54 Harv. J. on Legis. 17, 61.
