= Daniel M. Tredwell =

Attorney, historian of New York (1826–1921)

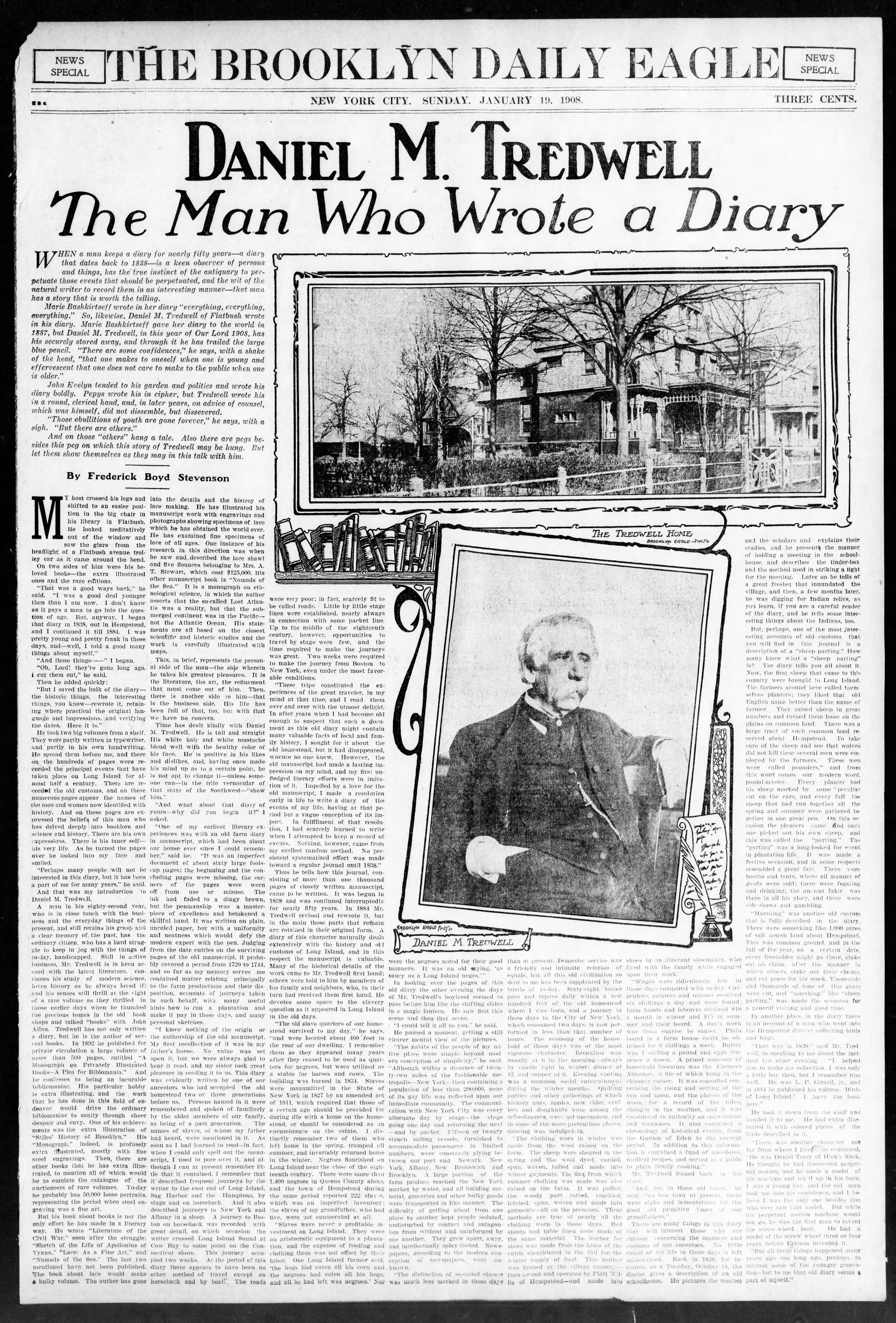
"Daniel M. Tredwell, the Man Who Wrote a Diary" (The Brooklyn Daily Eagle, 1908)

Daniel Melanchthon Tredwell (July 26, 1826 – November 10, 1921) was an American attorney, businessman, book collector, and author.

The son of Daniel Tredwell and Susan Ellsworth, Tredwell was a native New Yorker and graduate of Columbia before it was Columbia. His first job out of college was as a reporter for the Brooklyn Daily Freeman, a newspaper edited by Walt Whitman. Tredwell initially worked as a lawyer and chief clerk of the Supreme Court of Brooklyn. A bibliophile and book collector, in his spare time he wrote several books, often about the history and natural history of the greater New York area, with a focus on Long Island and Brooklyn. In later life he worked as an executive for various title insurance companies. He died in Brooklyn at the age of 95 and is buried in Greenfield Cemetery at Hempstead, Long Island. Tredwell was predeceased by his wife and survived by a daughter, Ida Tredwell Butler.

There is a painting of Tredwell by William Merritt Chase in the collection of the Metropolitan Museum of Art.

== Selected works ==
- Tredwell, Daniel M. (1874). Literature of the Civil War.
- Tredwell, Daniel M. (1912). Personal reminiscences of men and things on Long Island. Brooklyn: C.A. Ditmas. OCLC 692139379.
