= Very Young Girls =

- Directed by: David Schisgall and Nina Alvarez
- Distributed by: Showtime
- Release date: 2007
- Running time: 81 minutes
- Country: US
- Language: English

Very Young Girls is a 2007 sex trafficking documentary and exposé. Airing on Showtime and directed by David Schisgall and Nina Alvarez, the show follows 13- and 14-year-old African-American girls as they are seduced, abused, and sold on New York's streets by pimps, while being treated as adult criminals by police. The film follows the barely adolescent girls in real time, using vérité and intimate interviews with them as they are first lured onto the streets and the dire events which follow. The film also uses startling footage shot by the brazen pimps themselves, giving a rare glimpse into how the cycle of street life begins for many women.

The film documents the work of Girls Educational and Mentoring Services (GEMS), a recovery center founded and operated by Rachel Lloyd, a survivor of sexual exploitation. She and her staff help girls sent by the court or found on the street that are working in prostitution. The documentary shows that, given a chance to piece their lives back together, many teeter on the edge of two different worlds consistently battling the forces that suck them back into the underground. Through the use of unprecedented access to girls and pimps, the producers of the documentary hope to "change the way law enforcement, the media and society as a whole view sexual exploitation, street prostitution, and human trafficking that is happening right in our own backyard."

== Release ==
The film was an official selection in the 2008 Toronto International Film Festival, the 2008 Edinburgh Film Festival, the 2008 Independent Film Festival Boston, the 2008 True/False Film Festival, the 2008 Miami International Film Festival, the 2008 Jerusalem Film Festival, the 2008 Jackson Hole Film Festival, and the 2008 Indie Spirit Film Festival. The cable network Showtime has broadcast and distributed the documentary.

== Reception ==
The film has 10 reviews on Rotten Tomatoes with 7 reviews being positive, 70% positive.

== See also ==
- Commercial sexual exploitation of children
- International instruments relevant to prostitution of children
- Trafficking of children
