= Rachel Lloyd =

British anti-trafficking advocate and author

Rachel Lloyd CMG
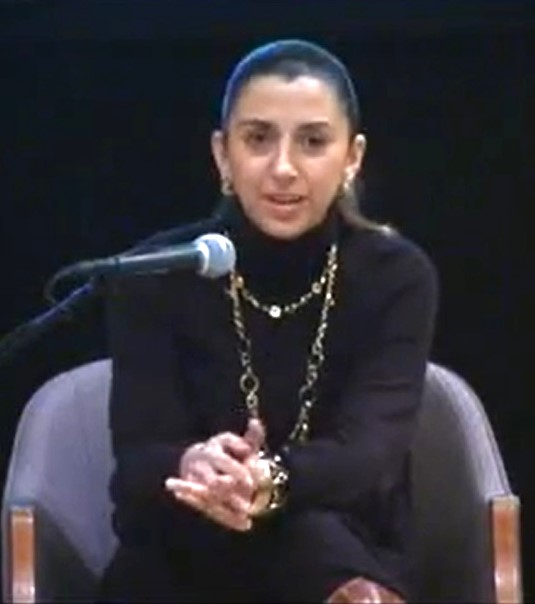
- Lloyd speaks at the Brooklyn Museum in 2008
- Born: 1975 (age 50–51); Stalbridge, Dorset, England
- Occupation: CEO
- Known for: Anti-trafficking advocacy, Girls Educational and Mentoring Services

Rachel Elizabeth Lloyd CMG (born 1975) is a British anti-trafficking advocate, author and the founder of Girls Educational and Mentoring Services. She is known for her work on the issue of commercial sexual exploitation and domestic trafficking and has been a leader in helping shift the perception of trafficked girls from criminals to victims, survivors, and leaders. She immigrated to the US in 1997 and began working to end domestic sex trafficking, primarily focusing on addressing the commercial sexual exploitation of children and young women. In 1998, she established Girls Educational and Mentoring Services, which is based in Harlem, New York.

In March 1998, Lloyd attended the first International Summit of Sexually Exploited Youth, presented by the International Centre to Combat Exploitation of Children, held in Victoria, British Columbia. During the summit, she assisted in drafting a declaration and call to action by governments throughout the world. On 22 October 2009, she presented the declaration at the United Nations, following which, it was ratified by 120 countries.

In 2004, Lloyd was named one of the "100 Women Who Shape New York" by the New York Daily News. On 4 September 2006, she was recognised as a "Notable New Yorker" by WCBS-TV. Later that same year, she was also honoured with the Reebok Human Rights Award. In 2008, she was the recipient of the Social Entrepreneurship Award from the Manhattan Institute for Policy Research, and two years later she was named to an Ashoka Fellowship and a Prime Mover Fellowship. On 12 May 2010, she was named "New Yorker of the Week" by NY1.

== Early life ==
Rachel Lloyd was born in 1975, in Stalbridge, Dorset, England, where she was raised by her mother and stepfather. She attended private school on a scholarship to Portsmouth High School for Girls. While attending Portsmouth, she was on the receiving end of racial prejudice and taunting, expressed by both the school administration and members of her peer group. In response to the treatment she received at school and home, Lloyd left school at the age of 13.

In an interview published in Marie Claire magazine, Lloyd stated: "I was 17 when I turned my first trick, compared with the 12-year-olds I meet today." When she was 17 years old, she moved to Germany. In 1994, Lloyd started on the road to recovery with the help of a military family and a church on a United States Air Force base in Germany.

== Life in New York ==
In 1997, Lloyd immigrated to the US to begin working with incarcerated adult women. She began working with adult women who were coming out of prostitution, as well as women incarcerated at Rikers Island and county correctional facilities. She later began addressing domestic policy in an effort to abolish sex trafficking, primarily focusing on the commercial sexual exploitation of children and young women. She also reached out to women working the streets of Hunts Point in the Bronx. During this time, she observed the need for community services for young women who were either at risk of being sexually exploited or were currently being trafficked. She recognised the severe emotional and practical needs of women and young girls who were being ignored by traditional government-based social service agencies.

After arriving in New York, Lloyd returned to school and began studying in preparation to take her General Educational Development test. With this certification, she continued on to college, earning a Bachelor of Arts degree in psychology from Marymount Manhattan College and her Master of Arts degree in applied urban anthropology from the City College of New York.

== Advocacy work ==
In 1998, Lloyd established the Girls Educational and Mentoring Services, which works to support girls and young women who have experienced the commercial sex industry in the US. The vision for the organisation was birthed from Lloyd's own experiences of sexual exploitation as a teenager, in addition to her encounters with the ineffective support services of the political and social systems which had been designed to protect the victims of violence and abuse. As of 2012, the organisation is one of the largest providers of services to young women and girls, ages 12–24, who have experienced commercial sexual exploitation and domestic trafficking. The organisation provides direct services for over 1,000 girls and young women each year. As of 2014, Lloyd serves as the chief executive officer of the organisation.

Lloyd was appointed Companion of the Order of St Michael and St George (CMG) in the 2020 New Year Honours for services to supporting victims and survivors of commercial sexual exploitation and trafficking.

=== Legislative focus ===
Lloyd works to address legislative shortfalls which limit the effectiveness of government and community programs and ability of individuals and organisations to reach victims of sex trafficking in cities and states across the US. For example, although the federal Trafficking Victims Protection Act of 2000, defines human sex trafficking as a commercial sex act induced by force, fraud, or coercion, or involving a minor, many states continue to treat victims of child sexual exploitation as criminals. When Lloyd began working with victims, she discovered that New York, as well as many other states, relied on the enactment of legislation that contradicts the federal statute.

Lloyd works to change these misconceptions that view children as criminals. She played a key role in lobbying New York State legislators to pass the 2008 Safe Harbor for Exploited Youth Act. The bill recognises these children as victims, rather than criminals, and provides them with necessary social services. "It benefits girls who are not legally old enough to consent to sex, who'd be protected under statutory rape laws if money hadn't changed hands," she says.

In February 2010, Lloyd presented testimony before the United States Senate Judiciary Subcommittee on Human Rights and the Law hearing entitled "In Our Own Backyard: Child Prostitution and Sex Trafficking in the United States". In his opening statements, Senator Dick Durbin, chairman of the subcommittee, recognised Lloyd's leadership in addressing the sexual exploitation of children and advocating for change in the New York State criminal justice system.

=== Public education ===
Very Young Girls is a 2007 documentary film that presents the work of the Girls Educational and Mentoring Services. Directed by David Schisgall, the film is an exposé of human trafficking that follows 13- and 14-year-old American girls as they are coerced and exploited on New York's streets by pimps while being treated as adult criminals by police.

The film was an official selection in the 2007 Toronto International Film Festival, the 2008 Edinburgh Film Festival, the 2008 Independent Film Festival Boston, the 2008 True/False Film Festival, the 2008 Miami Film Festival, the 2008 Jerusalem Film Festival, the 2008 Jackson Hole Wildlife Film Festival, and the 2008 Indie Spirit Film Festival. The film has been broadcast and distributed by Showtime Networks.

== Published works ==
- Lloyd, Rachel (2011). Girls Like Us: Fighting for a World Where Girls Are Not for Sale, an Activist Finds Her Calling and Heals Herself. HarperCollins. ISBN 978-0061582059
