= Justice Resource Institute =

American non-profit organization

Justice Resource Institute (JRI)
- Established: 1973; 53 years ago
- Headquarters: Needham, Massachusetts
- Region served: Southern New England
- Key people: Mia DeMarco, MPA (CEO); Kari Beserra, LMHC (COO); Bisser Dokov, MBA (CFO & EVP)
- Website: jri.org

The Justice Resource Institute (JRI) is a nonprofit organization based in Needham, Massachusetts, that provides outpatient specialty mental health services to disadvantaged, under-served and severely impacted youth and adults.

== Community services ==
JRI has been involved in providing the following services:

- Therapeutic day/boarding schools in New England
- Mental health and counseling services
- Intensive Residential Treatment Programs (IRTPs)
- Transitional/group homes for youth
- HIV case management
- Sex offender treatment (cancelled in 2003)
- Outreach services to homeless youth

== Therapeutic schools ==
JRI currently has 16 therapeutic schools, in Massachusetts and Connecticut.
