= Girls Educational and Mentoring Services =

U.S. non-profit organization

Girls Educational and Mentoring Services (GEMS) is a non-profit organization that provides services to commercially sexually exploited and domestically trafficked girls and young women, typically underage youth exploited by pimps and traffickers. The organization is based in Harlem, New York City. The work of GEMS is the subject of the 2007 documentary Very Young Girls. In 2007, their founder, Rachel Lloyd, wrote her autobiography, entitled Girls Like Us, that presents her personal background and her efforts to establish the GEMS organization.

== Organizational background ==
GEMS was founded by Rachel Lloyd in 1998, who continues to serve as the organization's executive director. The organization has helped several hundred young girls transition out of the sex industry and get back to their full potential. They also participated in lobbying for passage of the Safe Harbor Act for Sexually Exploited Youth, which provides that girls under the age of 16, who are arrested in New York for prostitution will be treated as victims, rather than criminals. The bill was signed into law in September 2008.
