= Slide (FBG Duck song) =

2017 song by FBG Duck

- Cover art for This How I'm Coming 2

Single by FBG Duck

from the album This How I'm Coming 2
- Released: December 8, 2017 (mixtape); March 28, 2018 (commercial single)
- Recorded: 2017
- Genre: Chicago drill; trap
- Length: 3:56 (original mixtape release); 3:36 (commercial single)
- Label: RECORDS, LLC; Columbia
- Songwriters: Carlton Weekly; Manuel Smart; Kyriakos Seitaridis
- Producer: Lil Riico Beatz

FBG Duck singles chronology
"A Lot" (2018)	"Slide" (00000002)	"Look What Happened" (2018)

Official video
- "Slide" – FBG Duck on YouTube

21 Savage singles chronology
"Hot Spot" (2018)	"Slide" (remix) (2018)	"Clout" (2018)

Audio
- "Slide" (remix) on YouTube

"Slide" is a song by the American rapper FBG Duck from his mixtape This How I'm Coming 2 (2017)—the sequel to his mixtape This How I'm Coming (2016). First released on This How I'm Coming 2 through Spinrilla on December 8, 2017, it was re-released as a commercial single by RECORDS and Columbia Records on March 28, 2018. Written by FBG Duck (Carlton Weekly) alongside Manuel "Manny" Smart and the Greek producer Lil Riico Beatz (Kyriakos Seitaridis), "Slide" was recorded while Weekly was grieving the July 2017 murder of his older brother, Jermaine "FBG Brick" Robinson, and centers on Weekly taunting rival gang members to back up their online threats and slide—street slang for driving into enemy territory to carry out an attack. Musically, it is a Chicago drill song over a trap beat with bell tones, menacing synths, and a delayed bass drop, opening with Weekly telling his DJ that he refuses to use Auto-Tune.

After "Slide" became a Chicago radio staple in early 2018, Weekly signed with Sony Music's RECORDS imprint and reached number eight on the US Apple Music chart that May, when the Atlanta rapper 21 Savage also appeared on a remix of the song. In 2023, the track was certified gold by the Recording Industry Association of America (RIAA). Upon its release, "Slide" received positive reviews from music critics, who praised its production and Weekly's vocal delivery—which shifts between whispers, trills, and screams. The track appeared on several year-end lists for 2018, including Spin's 101 Best Songs of the Year. Retrospectively, publications including Pitchfork, Vulture, Cleveland.com, and XXL ranked "Slide" as one of the best and most defining tracks of the Chicago drill subgenre.

Directed by Rickee Arts and uploaded to YouTube on January 24, 2018, the accompanying music video uses a bouncing camera to follow Weekly and a group of hooded men pointing firearms at the lens in the style of early-2010s Chicago drill videos. The clip went viral online and had amassed over 54 million views by the time Weekly was fatally shot in Chicago in August 2020. Throughout 2018, Lil Riico Beatz's instrumental was used for viral freestyles and remixes that helped launch the careers of the rappers Queen Key, Kidd Kenn, and Sexyy Red. Following Weekly's death, "Slide" was remembered by media outlets as his signature song and remained a standard of Chicago club and concert DJ sets into the 2020s.

== Background and recording ==
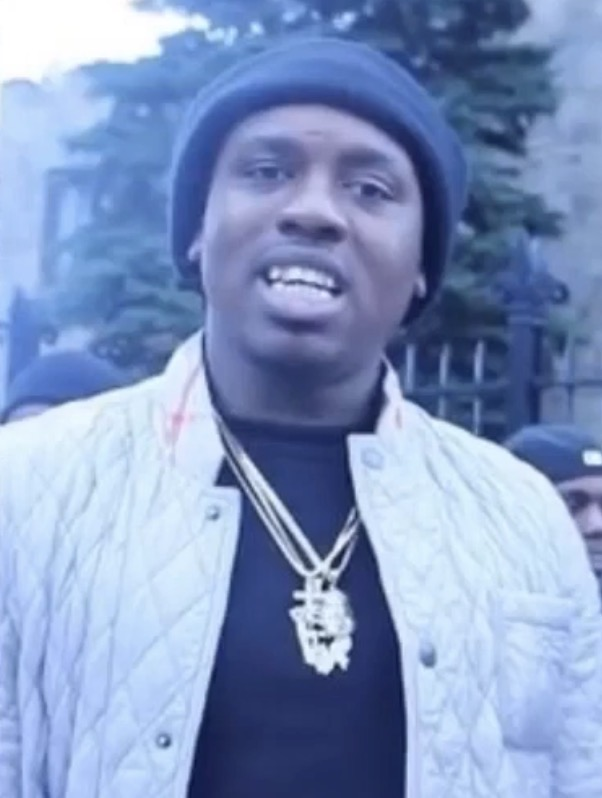
Jermaine "FBG Brick" Robinson in 2017; his killing that July influenced the angry tone of "Slide".

The instrumental for "Slide" was created by Kyriakos Seitaridis, a Greek producer from Menidi known professionally as Lil Riico (or Lil Riico Beatz). Inspired by Chicago drill musicians such as Chief Keef, Lil JoJo, and producer Young Chop, Seitaridis began making beats at age 16 and sending them via Instagram to rival Chicago crews. (Note: Before connecting with Weekly, Seitaridis first placed instrumentals while in high school with Chicago rappers Rico Recklezz, Lil Mister, and Swagg Dinero; because Weekly was less mainstream than Chief Keef at the time, Seitaridis found it easier to reach Weekly's camp.) Although FBG Duck (Carlton Weekly) was known in the South Side drill scene for diss tracks aimed at Chief Keef and other rivals, Seitaridis sent work to both camps; in December 2015, Weekly left a comment on Seitaridis's Instagram page saying "I need beats like this" and messaged him to get instrumentals directly. While living in Stuttgart, Germany, and working at a Greek restaurant as a "barman", Seitaridis had no studio monitors at home, so he made beats late at night after his shifts on a laptop with Beats headphones. From a beat pack Seitaridis sent him, Weekly chose the "Slide" instrumental for his 2017 mixtape This How I'm Coming 2—the sequel to his November 2016 tape This How I'm Coming—with Seitaridis credited as producer and co-composer alongside Weekly, who performed the vocals and wrote the lyrics with co-credited songwriter Manuel "Manny" Smart. (Note: The Mechanical Licensing Collective lists Weekly and Seitaridis as the song's composers and authors, whereas Apple Music credits Weekly and Smart for composition and lyrics as songwriters and Seitaridis solely as producer; neither database specifies Smart's individual contribution.)

Weekly recorded "Slide" in about 40 minutes after his older brother, Jermaine "FBG Brick" Robinson, was shot and killed in July 2017. Speaking with XXL in June 2018, Weekly said he had been mourning his brother and was "very intoxicated" in the studio, with "a lot of stuff I wanted to say" as he tried to "find myself". In a VladTV interview later that year, Weekly explained that rather than writing lyrics on paper, he composed and memorized his verses inside the recording booth and went "with the flow", channeling his anger over events in his life at the time. Neither artist expected the song to become a breakout success; Seitaridis initially regarded it as a routine mixtape track, (Note: According to Seitaridis, "Slide" drew little notice when first released on the mixtape, before gaining traction two to three months later following the release of its music video.) and Weekly said that although he anticipated it would reach a million views on YouTube, he was experimenting to "see what the people would like, what I gotta do to get me a big hit".

== Composition and lyrics ==
"Slide"
A 21-second sample of "Slide", featuring the delayed bass drop over bell tones and hi-hats as Weekly shifts between a "sing-song whisper", an "amused trill", and "wide-eyed screams".

"Slide" is a Chicago drill song built on what Billboard's Nerisha Penrose described as a "booming trap beat, laced with menacing synths and thick drums", while Lucas Foster of Passion of the Weiss called the instrumental a "gorgeous post-drill beat" that is "gleeful and terrifying, catchy while sneering at the idea of pop". According to digital track metadata from Beatport, the song is set in the key of B♭ minor at a tempo of 160 beats per minute, running for 3 minutes and 56 seconds on the original This How I'm Coming 2 mixtape before being trimmed to 3 minutes and 36 seconds for its commercial single release. Writing for Passion of the Weiss, Tosten Burks noted that Lil Riico Beatz structures the production around the tension of "The Drop", opening with bell tones, ticking hi-hats, and handclaps while "teasingly withholding bass until it explodes alongside screaming ad-libs". Over the instrumental, Weekly raps in a deep, "melodic yet raspy" voice with "animated accents and last-syllable flairs in the tradition of King Louie", shifting his vocal delivery between what Pitchfork's Alphonse Pierre called a "sing-song whisper", what Burks termed an "amused trill" and a "'B.O.N.'-style squawk", and what Trey Alston of Vulture described as "a barrage of wide-eyed screams".

The track opens with Weekly telling his DJ, "I don't want no autotune", before launching into an opening line about a "real nigga party". Burks read the spoken intro as both an "aesthetic disclaimer and targeted diss channeling extramusical resentment" toward first-wave Chicago drill stars who had risen to fame using Auto-Tune while mocking Weekly's slain 15-year-old friend on their breakout records. (Note: During the early 2010s Chicago drill wave, rival artists such as Lil Durk and Chief Keef popularized melodic, Auto-Tune-heavy drill songs while feuding with Weekly's Gangster Disciples faction and mocking murdered rivals such as teenage rapper Lil JoJo.) Centered on the street slang term slide—driving into rival territory to carry out an attack (Note: King's College London linguist and slang lexicographer Tony Thorne defines sliding as "driving into enemy territory", and the Chicago Tribune has reported that the term refers to "gang-related drive-by shootings".)—the lyrics trace what Burks called "the thin line between taunts and attacks", alternating between stretches of "rising action (explaining why you won't slide) and climax (what happens when you slide)". Throughout the verses, Weekly "challenges his foes to put action behind their threats", in Penrose's words, issuing what Alston characterized as "pleas for his enemies to come see him" in person. Penrose also pointed to the lines "I can't shake your hand / No, I'm not your friend / I don't fuck with rappers / No, I'm not a fan" as an expression of Weekly's distrust and need to keep his inner circle tight, whereas Burks highlighted the track's "grinning energy" and "numb glee", singling out "I can't shake your hand" as a warning and the line "Don't wanna hear them loud sounds, then be quiet" as a "helpful lesson".

== Release and promotion ==
=== Original and music video ===
"Slide" first appeared on December 8, 2017, as the fourth of ten tracks on Weekly's mixtape This How I'm Coming 2, which was hosted by DJ Cortez and released on the digital platform Spinrilla. On January 24, 2018, an accompanying music video directed by Rickee Arts was uploaded to YouTube, showing Weekly surrounded by a large crowd as hooded men point firearms at a bouncing camera. Pitchfork's Alphonse Pierre described the clip as a "traditional drill video" that "could have been recorded in any year throughout the 2010s", while Lucas Foster of Passion of the Weiss wrote that the track is "matched with the visual commentary of a bouncing camera focused on a big group of men and their bigger guns".

After the video drew between one and four million views in its first week, (Note: In a June 2018 interview with Vice Greece, Seitaridis stated that the music video reached roughly four million views in its first week, whereas in a December 2021 interview he recalled it gaining "like one million views in one week".) XXL's Robby Seabrook III wrote that the song "took over his city, then blew up online". Following the song's viral rise, Weekly signed with Sony's RECORDS imprint, which partnered with Columbia Records to re-release "Slide" commercially for digital download and streaming on March 28, 2018. On May 7, 2018, the single reached number eight on the US Apple Music chart, which Weekly promoted on Instagram by posting a screenshot thanking his fans and urging listeners to "push this BITCH to #1". The original music video passed 18 million YouTube views by early May 2018, 23 million by early June, and 54 million by the time of Weekly's death in August 2020; on January 17, 2023, the Recording Industry Association of America (RIAA) certified "Slide" gold for 500,000 track-equivalent units.

=== 21 Savage remix ===
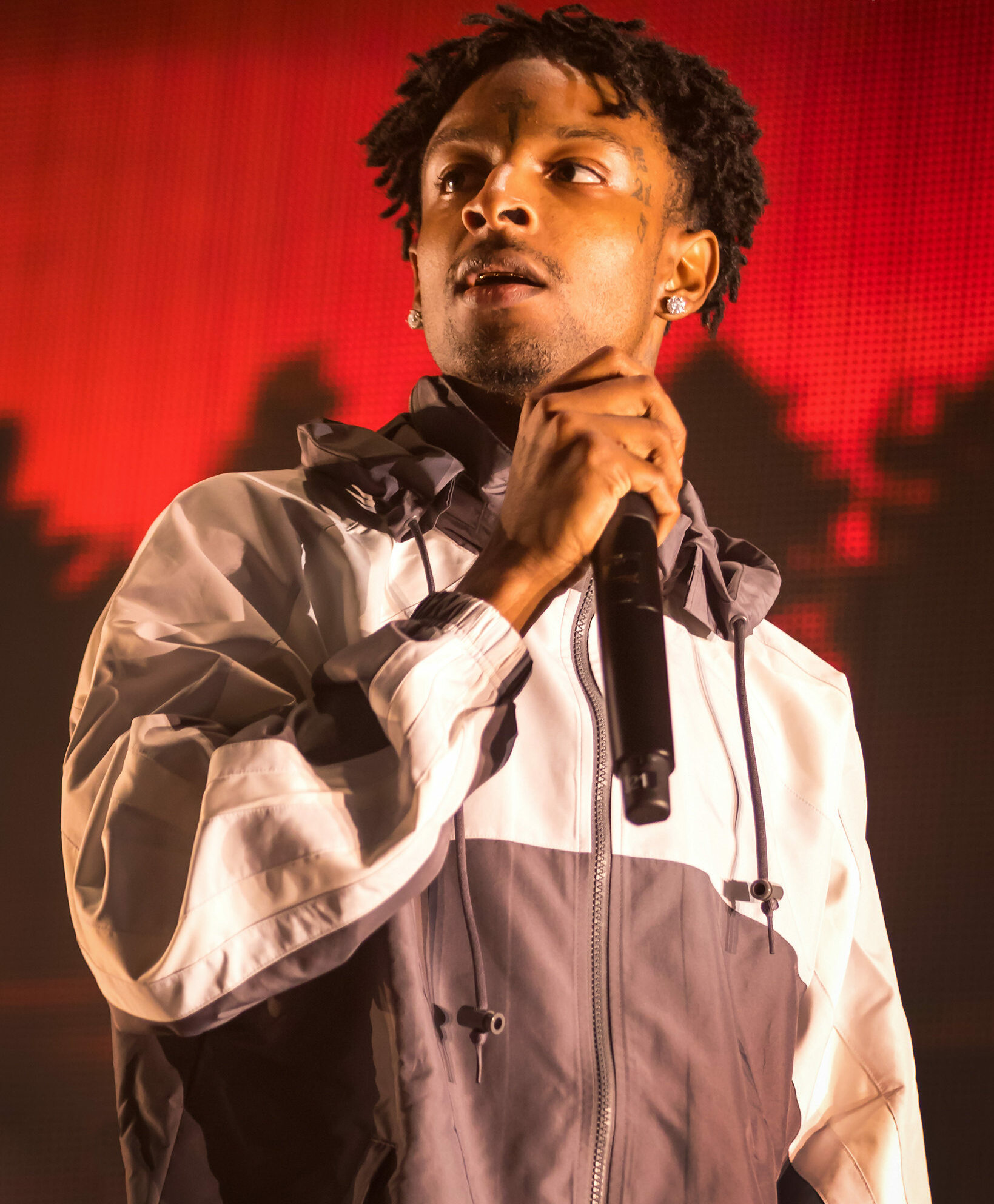
21 Savage (pictured in 2018) recorded his guest verse for the official "Slide" remix at a studio in Atlanta.

As "Slide" gained traction online, fellow rappers including G Herbo and Atlanta-based artist 21 Savage publicly co-signed the song. Speaking with VladTV, Weekly recalled that after he reached out to 21 Savage on friendly terms, the two met at a recording studio in Atlanta where 21 Savage laid down a guest verse for a remix; Weekly previewed the collaboration on Instagram by posting a photo with 21 Savage and a story playing Seitaridis's beat. RECORDS and Columbia released the official remix on May 8, 2018, at a time when 21 Savage was touring nationally with Post Malone and making guest appearances on singles by Childish Gambino and Offset. In his verse, 21 Savage backs Weekly's threats with graphic lines about gun violence, stakeouts at candlelight vigils, and funeral shootouts, rapping, "After the candlelight we pushin' up, shoot the funeral up / You think 'cause you went and tatted your face, that shit make you tough?"

Patrick Montes of Hypebeast viewed the guest appearance as a "major co-sign to FBG Duck's current ascent" featuring "some of [21 Savage's] hardest flows in recent memory", calling the remix one of Chicago's biggest rap releases of 2018. The Fader's Jordan Darville praised it as a "great remix" that "retooled" Weekly's breakout single, and Alex Zidel of HotNewHipHop found the track "arguably even more dynamic than the original as 21's voice sounds perfect for the beat", though Burks noted at the end of 2018 that the remix had 38 million fewer YouTube views than Weekly's solo version. Ranking the verse as 21 Savage's second-best guest feature since his 2017 debut album Issa Album, HotNewHipHop's Narsimha Chintaluri wrote that although it was initially hard to imagine how his "typically reserved cadence would match up to Duck's half-screamed lyrics", 21 Savage sidestepped stylistic comparisons by entering "fast and strong" with an "extended diatribe directed at pseudo-gangsta rappers" and stories from his own past in Atlanta.

== Critical reception ==
Initial reviews of "Slide" were positive—characterized as a "chilly, menacing local hit" in the Chicago Reader, an "abrasive yet catchy" street single in XXL, and a "brash, beef-stoking" record in The Fader. Writing for Passion of the Weiss, Lucas Foster called the track "drill rap as God intended it to be, gleeful and terrifying" and praised Weekly's refusal of Auto-Tune in the intro as a "wise choice", predicting that 2018 would "see a lot less of it". On December 2018 year-end lists, Spin included "Slide" at number 69 among the year's "101 Best Songs" and Passion of the Weiss had it at number 26 among the top 50 rap tracks, where Tosten Burks called it Weekly's "biggest hit to date", even as the Chicago Reader's Leor Galil wrote that "the mainstream press has barely noticed it—but it's also become a Chicago radio staple and racked up nearly 40 million YouTube views".

In October 2019, Pitchfork's Alphonse Pierre selected "Slide" for a feature on the eleven songs that defined Chicago drill during the 2010s, writing that it "arrived at a time when the drill scenes in both the UK and Brooklyn were picking up steam, but his 2018 single is a reminder that the home of drill will always be Chicago". In April 2021, XXL's Kemet High included "Slide" on an unranked list of the best drill songs of the preceding five years. In August 2022, Vulture's Trey Alston named "Slide" one of seventeen essential drill songs, writing that the track trusted Chicago's basic formula—"be simple, bruise speakers, and discuss untold levels of violence"—and put Weekly "in a position to revive Chicago drill after Chief Keef's 2012 debut album was considered a flop and the scene's momentum slowed". Ranking "Slide" at number 24 on Cleveland.com's 2022 list of the 30 greatest drill songs of all time, Troy L. Smith similarly wrote that Weekly had appeared ready to pick up where Chief Keef left off, while adding that the track's violent lyrics became "eerie to listen to" after Weekly's murder in 2020.

== Impact and aftermath ==
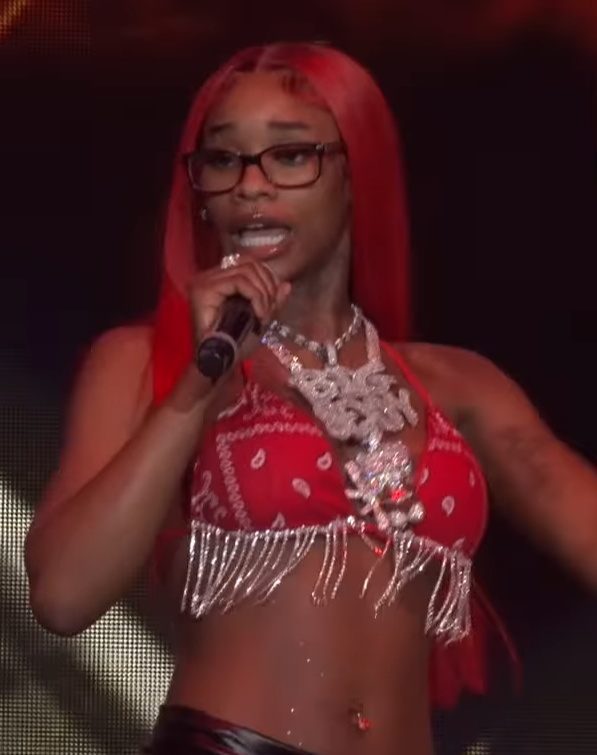
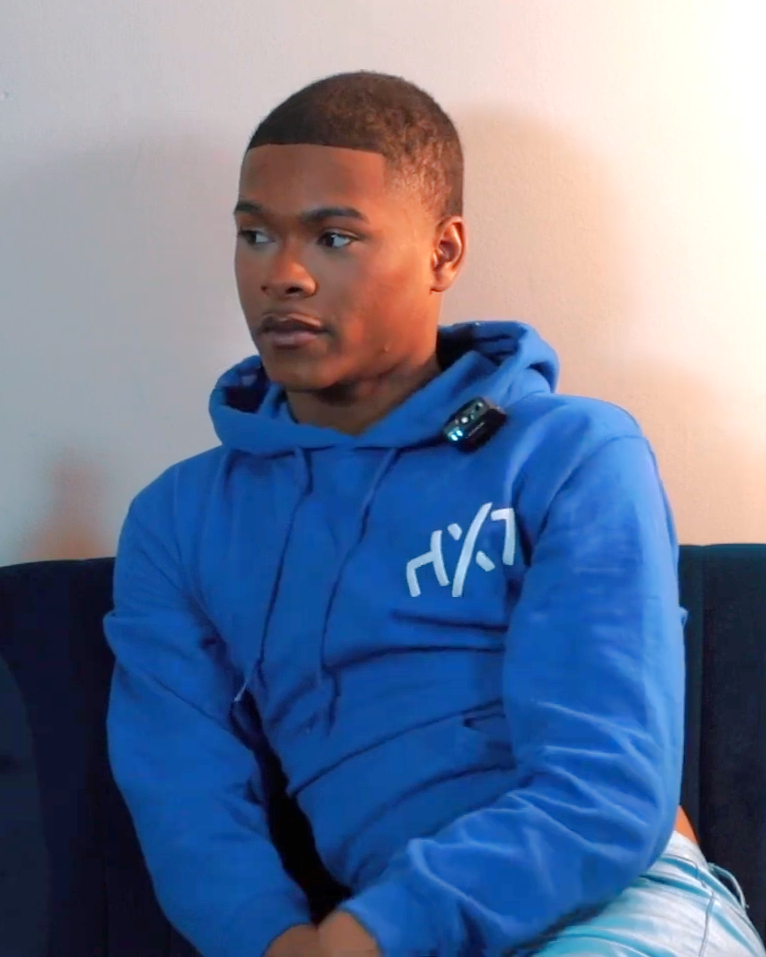
Pictured in 2023, Sexyy Red (left) and Kidd Kenn (right) launched their rap careers in 2018 with viral freestyles over the "Slide" instrumental.

Throughout 2018, Lil Riico Beatz's instrumental for "Slide" became a popular beat for freestyles and remixes that helped launch several emerging rappers' careers. In April 2018, WorldStarHipHop premiered a music video for a remix by south-suburban Chicago rapper Queen Key, which surpassed one million YouTube views within four months. Galil praised Key's version for how "her playful snarl enhances the instrumental's subtle sparkle", and The Fader's Meaghan Garvey contrasted the clip's female-centered cast with traditional male-dominated drill videos, pointing out a cameo by "an unusually bashful-looking Chance the Rapper, who appears well aware he is getting out-charisma'd".

That summer, 15-year-old openly gay Chicago rapper Kidd Kenn circulated on Twitter with a viral freestyle over "Slide" that tweaked Weekly's opening bar into "It's a faggot party baby, you cannot get in"; Kenn told The Fader that he liked "rapping over the most gangsta street track, with these different types of lyrics than what you are use[d] to hearing", and the clip's popularity brought him out for Kehlani's June 2018 San Francisco Pride show as well as a meeting with Def Jam Recordings. St. Louis rapper Sexyy Red also uploaded a "racy approach" to the "Slide" beat as her first song on YouTube in 2018, recalling to XXL that once followers kept writing "Send this song, send this song" on her Instagram posts, "that's when people start[ed] trying to book me".

After Weekly was killed in Chicago on August 4, 2020, at age 26, BBC News, The Independent, and The Fader remembered him as the artist behind the 2018 viral hit "Slide", while writing for The TRiiBE after the shooting, Matt Harvey and Vee L. Harrison observed that the track remained "ubiquitous amongst young Black Chicagoans". In a March 2021 Chicago Reader piece on clubs shuttered by the COVID-19 pandemic, Tara C. Mahadevan wrote that Chicagoans "never got the chance to memorialize FBG Duck with 'Slide' or King Von" on packed dancefloors alongside local anthems like Chief Keef's "Faneto". At Lil Baby's August 2023 concert at Chicago's United Center, The TRiiBE's Jerome Johnson reported that the arena "turned into a $5 basement party" between sets as the DJ acknowledged local rap by playing "Slide" alongside Chief Keef's "Faneto", Lil Durk's "Hellcats & Trackhawks", and King Von's "Crazy Story".

== Track listing ==
Digital download / streaming
No.	Title	Length
1.	"Slide"	3:36

Remix single
No.	Title	Length
1.	"Slide" (Remix; feat. 21 Savage)	4:13

=== Notes ===
- The original mixtape version (3:56) appears as track 4 on This How I'm Coming 2.
- Both the commercial single and the remix were released through RECORDS, LLC and Columbia Records.

== Personnel ==
Credits adapted from American Society of Composers, Authors and Publishers, Mechanical Licensing Collective, and Apple Music.

=== Original ===
- Carlton Weekly – vocals, lyrics, composition
- Manuel "Manny" Smart – lyrics, composition
- Lil Riico Beatz (Kyriakos Seitaridis) – composition, production

=== Remix ===
- Carlton Weekly – vocals, lyrics, composition
- Shéyaa Bin Abraham-Joseph – vocals
- Manuel "Manny" Smart – lyrics, composition
- Lil Riico Beatz (Kyriakos Seitaridis) – composition, production

== Certifications ==
Region	Certification	Certified units/sales
United States (RIAA)	Gold	500,000^{‡}
^{*} Sales figures based on certification alone.^{^} Shipments figures based on certification alone.

== See also ==
- 21 Savage discography
- Music of Chicago
