= List of contract killers and hitmen =

List of current and former contract killers in different countries

This article contains a list of contract killers, both living and deceased, sorted by the country in which they engaged in said crimes.

Contract killing, sometimes known as murder-for-hire, refers to the act in which one party employs another party to murder a targeted person via an illegal agreement that involves some form of compensation. An act of contract killing is known colloquially as a hit, and the person performing the killing (i.e. the contract killer or "contractor") is known as the hitman.

Persons who have only carried out an assassination-style murder at the behest of their own motivation, without having either a criminal background, or links to the criminal underworld or other such groups, do not qualify as hitmen. They are not to be included in this list.

== Australia ==
- Rodney Charles Collins
- Christopher Dale Flannery
- Keith Faure
- Evangelos Goussis
- Lindsey Robert Rose
- Andrew Benji Veniamin

== Brazil ==
- Maia "Mainha" Cunha
- Julio Santana

== Canada ==
- Richard Blass
- Howard Doyle Berry
- Bal Buttar
- Salvatore Calautti
- David Carroll
- Paul "Fon Fon" Fontaine
- Gerald Gallant
- Dean Daniel Kelsie
- Cecil Kirby
- Donald Lavoie
- Jackie McLaughlin
- Kenneth Murdock
- Dwight Mushey
- Serge Quesnel
- Armand Sanguigni
- Aimé Simard
- Réal Simard
- Yves Trudeau
- Dean Michael Wiwchar

== Chile ==
- José Ruz Rodríguez

== China ==
- Xi Guangan
- Ling Xiansi

== Colombia ==
- Andrés Leonardo Achipiz
- Jorge Ayala
- Héctor Orlando Bastidas
- Diego Murillo Bejarano
- Dandeny Muñoz Mosquera
- Jhon Jairo Velásquez

== Croatia ==
- Sretko Kalinić
- Robert Matanić

== Czech Republic ==
- Jiří Kájínek

== Denmark ==
- Jim-Bo Poulsen

== Estonia ==
- Imre Arakas

== Finland ==
- Janne Raninen

== India ==
- Noor "Noora" Baksh
- Yash Pratap Singh(Pratap)
- Shri Prakash Shukla

== Germany ==
- Werner Pinzner ″St.-Pauli-Killer″

== Ireland ==
- Liam Brannigan
- Robbie Lawlor
- James Quinn

== Italy ==
- Maurizio Avola
- Pasquale Barra
- Giovanni Brusca
- Giuseppe Greco
- Giuseppe Lucchese
- Mario Prestifilippo
- Giulia Tofana

== Japan ==
- Toshio Maruyama
- Tetsuya Shiroo

== Jamaica ==
- Christopher Anthony Lee

== Mexico ==
- Melissa Calderón
- David Barrón Corona
- Gregorio Sauceda-Gamboa
- José Rodrigo Aréchiga Gamboa
- José Manuel Martínez
- Ramón Torres Méndez
- Joselyn Alejandra Niño
- Héctor Luis Palma Salazar
- Marciano Millán Vasquez

== Netherlands ==
- Edwin Martínez
- Ridouan Taghi
- Shardyone Semerel

== New Zealand ==
- Jeremy Powell

== Philippines ==
- Edgar Matobato

== Poland ==
- Ryszard Bogucki
- Ryszard Niemczyk
- Jerzy Vaulin
- Artur Zirajewski

== Russia ==
- Igor the Assassin
- Arsen Bayrambekov
- Maxim Lazovsky
- Alexander Pustovalov
- Oleg Smorodinov
- Alexander Solonik
- Andrey Vershinin
- Alexei Sherstobitov

== Serbia ==
- Sretko Kalinić

== Singapore ==
- Anthony Ler
- Muhammad Nasir Abdul Aziz

== Slovakia ==
- Jozef Roháč

== Spain ==
- Idoia López Riaño

== Sweden ==
- Nenad Mišović

== Turkey ==
- Abdullah Çatlı
- Mahmut Yıldırım

== United Kingdom ==
=== England ===
- John Childs
- Mark Fellows
- Paul Glen
- Jimmy Moody

=== Scotland ===
- Billy 'Buff' Paterson

== United States ==
- Joe Adonis
- Felix Alderisio
- John Alite
- William Aloisio
- Willie "Two-Knife" Altieri
- Albert Anastasia
- Joseph Barboza
- Harry Aleman
- Gakirah Barnes
- Robert Biehler
- Bobby Boriello
- Fiore Buccieri
- Lepke Buchalter
- Fred Burke
- Anthony Capo
- Frank M. Canton
- Charles Carneglia
- Charles Carrollo
- Robert Carey
- Jackie Cerone
- Pasquale Conte
- Nate "Boone" Craft
- Roy DeMeo
- Sam DeStefano
- Richard DiNome
- Glennon Engleman
- Ray Ferritto
- Stephen Flemmi
- Vincent Flemmi
- Jimmy Fratianno
- Carmine Galante
- Vito Genovese
- Jason Getsy
- Sam Giancana
- Fred Goetz
- Martin Goldstein
- Sammy Gravano
- Frank Gusenberg
- Charles Harrelson
- Tom Horn
- Cornelius Hughes
- Stevie Hughes
- John Kelley
- Richard Kuklinski
- Mad Dog Coll
- Maurice Lerner
- Samuel "Red" Levine
- José Manuel Martínez
- Johnny Martorano
- Robert Mormando
- Donald Nash
- Charles Nicoletti
- Wayne "Silk" Perry
- Ross Prio
- David "Chippy" Robinson
- Frank Salemme
- James "Fur" Sammons
- Anthony Senter
- John Scalise
- Gregory Scarpa
- Frank Schweihs
- Frank Sheeran
- Shotgun Man
- Bugsy Siegel
- Thomas Sinito
- Vincent Smothers
- Joseph "Mad Dog" Sullivan
- Albert Tannenbaum
- Joseph Testa
- Salvatore Testa
- Stephen Wayne Anderson (disputed)
- Umberto Valenti
- Abraham Weinberg
- Jack Whalen
- Gus Winkler

== See also ==
- List of assassinations in Europe
