= Chino =

Chino or El Chino may refer to:

== Art, entertainment, and media ==
- Chino (1973 film), an Italian film starring Charles Bronson
- Chino (1991 film), a Nepali film

== Places ==
- Chino, California, a city in San Bernardino County, California, US
- Chino, Nagano, a city in Nagano prefecture, Japan
- Chino Hills, a mountain range on the border of Orange, Los Angeles, and San Bernardino counties, California
- Chino Hills, California, a city in San Bernardino County, California, US
- Chino Valley, Arizona, a town in Yavapai County, Arizona, US

== People ==
Ultimately derived from the word China, Chino is sometimes used in Spanish to denote a person of mixed racial identity or foreign appearance, either as a label or nickname.

=== People nicknamed "Chino" ===
- Chino Cadahia (born 1957), Cuban baseball coach
- Chino Herrera (1903–1983), Mexican actor and comedian
- Chino Moreno (born 1973), American musician
- Chino Pozo (1915–1980), Cuban drummer
- David Rheem, US poker player
- Chino Roque (born 1990), Filipino space cadets
- Javi Chino (born 1987), Spanish footballer
- Chino Smith (1903–1932), Negro league baseball player
- Jesús Alberto Miranda Pérez, one half of the Venezuelan pop duo Chino & Nacho
- César Huerta (born 2000), Mexican footballer

=== People nicknamed "El Chino" ===
- Alberto Fujimori (1938–2024), Peruvian president
- Jorge José Benítez (born 1950), Argentine footballer
- Daniel Canónico, (1916–1975), Venezuelan baseball player
- José Meléndez (1908–1985), Nicaraguan baseball player
- Manuel Flores (born 1965), Salvadoran politician
- Roberto Losada (born 1976), Spanish footballer
- Marcos Maidana, Argentine boxer
- Álvaro Recoba (born 1976), Uruguayan footballer
- Marcelo Ríos (born 1975), Chilean tennis player
- David Silva (born 1986), Spanish footballer
- Melissa Calderon née Melissa Margarita Calderon Ojeda, Mexican cartel leader nicknamed "La China"
- "El Chino", photographer whose photos are used in the Netflix TV series Narcos

=== People with this name ===
- Chino Darín (born 1989), Argentine actor and film producer
- Chino 'Fats' Williams (1933–2000), American actor
- Chino Rodriguez (1954–2022), American musician

=== People with this surname ===
- Tadao Chino (千野 忠男; 1934–2008), Japanese civil servant
- Wendell Chino (1923–1998), leader of the Mescalero Apache nation
- Toshiki Chino (千野 俊樹; born 1985), Japanese former football player
- Vera Chino (1943), Native American potter
- Tom Chino, Californian farmer

== Other uses ==
- Chino (Is the Order a Rabbit?), a character in the manga series Is the Order a Rabbit?
- Chinotto (soft drink) or Chino, a carbonated soft drink
- Chino cloth, a twill fabric
- California Institution for Men, a prison in Chino, San Bernardino County, California nicknamed "Chino"

== See also ==
- Cino (disambiguation)
