= Gangster Disciples–Black Disciples conflict =

Street gang feud in Chicago, Illinois

- Date: 1974–present
- Location: Chicago, Illinois, US (primarily); Other locations: Milwaukee, Atlanta and Charlotte
- Caused by: Split of the Black Gangster Disciple Nation after David Barksdale's death, drug trade disputes, territorial rivalries
- Status: Ongoing

Parties
Gangster Disciples: Tookaville; STL/EBT; Jaro City; JoJoWorld; Smashville; Fly Boy Gang (FBG); WugaWorld; D-Block; 069 Bricksquad; Spanish Gangster Disciples; BlockBurna; Goonie Boss faction; Faceworld; Man Up Band Up(MuBu); DSG/Dump Street Gang; Support: Folk Nation; Simon City Royals	Black Disciples: O Block; 300; 600; Only the Family (OTF); Frontstreet; THF 46; TYMB; Drill City; DGang; DoggPound/DPC; Support: Folk Nation

Lead figures
Larry Hoover (imprisoned); Carlton Weekly †; Gakirah Barnes †; Joseph Coleman †; Stephon Mack X	David Barksdale (deceased); Jerome Freeman (deceased); Dayvon Bennett †; Darnell McMiller (imprisoned); Dontay Banks Jr. X; Durk Banks

Number
~20,000–25,000 members (2025)	~8,000–10,000 members (2025)
- Casualty estimates based on law enforcement and media reports.

The Gangster Disciples–Black Disciples conflict is an ongoing feud between the Gangster Disciples (GD) and the Black Disciples (BD), two African American street gangs in Chicago. Ignited in 1974 by the split of the Black Gangster Disciple Nation (BGDN) after the death of BD co-founder David "King David" Barksdale, the rivalry has raged over drug territories and personal grudges, primarily in Chicago's South Side neighborhoods like Englewood and Roseland. Hundreds have died, including drill rappers FBG Duck and King Von. The 2010s rise of drill music, with its raw lyrics and social media taunts, has amplified the conflict, turning gang disputes into public spectacles. Despite federal RICO crackdowns, the feud persists as of 2026.

== Background ==
=== Rise of the Black Gangster Disciple Nation ===
In the early 1960s, David Barksdale formed the Devil's Disciples on Chicago's South Side, a gang that became the Black Disciples by 1966, battling rivals like the Black P. Stones. In 1969, Barksdale joined forces with Larry Hoover, leader of the Supreme Gangsters, to create the BGDN under the Folk Nation alliance. The BGDN ruled Chicago's drug trade, leveraging its size and discipline.

=== 1974 Split and Seeds of Conflict ===
On September 2, 1974, Barksdale died of kidney failure, a consequence of a 1968 assassination attempt, fracturing the BGDN. Hoover, imprisoned since 1973 for a murder conviction, led the Gangster Disciples, building a corporate-like hierarchy. Loyalists to Barksdale formed the Black Disciples, adopting a decentralized structure with “ministers” and revering Barksdale as a martyr. By 1989, competition over Englewood's drug markets sparked open warfare, with the BD chafing under GD dominance.

== Early conflict (1974–2000) ==
=== Crack Cocaine Fuels Violence (1974–1989) ===
Early skirmishes focused on drug turf, with the 1980s crack cocaine boom escalating bloodshed. The GD's tight organization clashed with the BD's loose “dynasties.” A 1978 truce, led by BD's Michael "Mickey Bull" Johnson, briefly calmed tensions, but his 1986 imprisonment shattered the peace.

== Pivotal incidents (1990s) ==
=== Murder of Mickey Bull (1991) ===
On August 6, 1991, BD leader Michael Johnson was gunned down in Englewood, allegedly by GD members. The next day, BD members killed three GD affiliates, fueling a deadly cycle. From 1991 to 1995, Chicago saw over 200 gang-related murders.

=== Killing of Robert "Yummy" Sandifer (1994) ===
On September 1, 1994, 11-year-old BD member Robert "Yummy" Sandifer shot 14-year-old Shavon Dean in Roseland during a drive-by aimed at GD rivals. Fearing he'd snitch, BD leaders ordered his death. On September 6, teens Derrick (14) and Cragg Hardaway (16) executed Sandifer under a viaduct, shocking the nation.

== Drill music (2010–present) ==
=== Birth of drill music ===
In the early 2010s, drill music emerged on Chicago's South Side, a raw hip-hop style with grim beats and violent lyrics, pioneered by Chief Keef (BD-affiliated) and producer Young Chop. Social media turned local beefs into global spectacles, with GD rappers like FBG Duck (Tookaville) and BD artists like Lil Durk (Lamron) and King Von (O-Block) trading insults in tracks like FBG Duck's "Dead Bitches," which mocked dead O-Block members.

=== 2016: Chicago’s deadliest year ===
In 2016, Chicago logged 739 murders, its bloodiest year since 1997, with 90% of gun violence tied to gangs, including GD and BD sets. On September 19, 2016, GD and BD members nearly brawled at New Food Inc. in Englewood after a BD called a GD a “rat” for allegedly snitching. The standoff, just 90 days after a failed June 2016 truce meeting, showed how petty slights sparked shootings. A BD member, “Kaos” (Ron), said, “If we’re sitting here bored, getting high and we got guns around, it ain’t nothing else to do.” That week, a drive-by wounded two GD members and a BD mother caught in the crossfire.

=== Major killings ===
==== Murder of Odee Perry (2011) ====
On 11th August 2011, Black Disciple Odee Perry was shot in 6400 block of South King Drive by Gangster Disciple Gakirah Barnes. After Perry‘s death, the Parkway Garden Homes would be named "O'Block" in his honor.

==== Murder of Lil JoJo (2012) ====
On September 4, 2012, 18-year old Joseph J. Coleman, more known as rapper “Lil JoJo”, was shot dead while riding his bike around a neighborhood. His killing was not long after he uploaded the song “3HunnaK” to YouTube. The killing of Coleman has shown to have worsened the conflict between the two gangs. Rapper Chief Keef, who was still living in Chicago at the time, was thought to have been the killer, or someone involved in the killing, by Coleman’s mother.

==== Murder of Gakirah Barnes (2014) ====
In 2014, 17-year-old Gangster Disciple Gakirah "KI" Barnes, a feared assassin linked to multiple murders, was shot dead in Woodlawn, allegedly by Black Disciple King Von, stoking the feud.

==== Murder of FBG Duck (2020) ====
On August 4, 2020, Carlton "FBG Duck" Weekly was ambushed and killed in Chicago's Gold Coast by O-Block BD members, tied to his diss track "Dead Bitches." Six O-Block members—Charles Liggins, Kenneth Roberson, Christopher Thomas, Marcus Smart, Tacarlos Offerd, and Ralph Turpin—were convicted in January 2024 for murder in aid of racketeering. An O‘Block Leader, King Von allegedly put a $100,000 bounty on FBG Duck, per FBI files. FBG Duck's mother, LaSheena Weekly, sued Lil Durk, King Von's estate, and OTF in 2024, claiming they fueled violence for profit.

==== Death of King Von (2020) ====
On November 6, 2020, BD rapper Dayvon "King Von" Bennett died in an Atlanta, after jumping rapper Quando Rondo and being shot by affiliate Timothy "Lul Tim" Leeks, however it was unrelated to the conflict with the Gangster Disciples.

==== Murder of Dontay "DThang" Banks Jr. (2021) ====
BD Rapper Dontay Banks Jr., the older brother of Lil Durk who performed as DThang, was killed at Club O, where multiple shots were fired and lots of weapons recovered on June 5th 2021, according to Harvey spokeswoman Giavonni Nickson. Shortly before Banks was shot, a Harvey police officer heard gunfire and noticed a person with a gun at the club at 17038 S Halsted Street, Nickson said. Seven months later, Stephon Mack, a member of the Gangster Disciples and leader of the Smashville GD faction would get killed in retaliation for DThang's murder.

==== Murder of Stephon Mack (2022) ====
On January 27th, 2022, Stephon Mack, the leader of the Smashville Faction of the Gangster Disciples was gunned down by Anthony Montgomery-Wilson and Preston Powell who were then charged with an individual murder-for-hire count, while Montgomery-Wilson also faced a firearm charge. The Authorities believe Mack's murder was revenge for the death of Lil Durk's brother Dontay Banks Jr., also known as DThang and found text messages that link them to Durk and OTF, however Durk has not been charged for Mack's murder.

== Law enforcement crackdowns ==
=== RICO indictments ===
Federal RICO statutes have targeted both gangs:

- 2016 GD Sweep: 32 GD members, including Frank Smith and Warren Griffin, were charged with 10 murders and drug trafficking, receiving life sentences in 2023.
- 2020 BD Bust: 23 BD members, including leader Darnell "Murder" McMiller, faced drug and gun charges.
- 2024 O-Block Convictions: Six BD members jailed for FBG Duck's murder.
- 2025 Spanish GD Case: Three GD members indicted for 2020 murders and arsons.

=== Police strategies ===
In 2016, Chicago police arrested 140 gang members, including GD and BD affiliates, using a "Strategic Subject List" to predict violence, seizing 23 guns and $45,000 in drugs. Critics argue that policing does not address root causes such as poverty and segregation.

== Cultural legacy ==
The feud has left a deep mark on Chicago through drill music, with artists like Chief Keef, FBG Duck, and King Von becoming global icons. Forrest Stuart's Ballad of the Bullet (2020) calls drill a survival tactic in broken communities, though it fans violence. From 2018 to 2020, 63% of Chicago's homicides hit 15 African-American and Hispanic neighborhoods, highlighting a “safety gap” tied to disinvestment. Annual BD events on May 24, Barksdale's birthday, and GD's loyalty to Hoover keep the feud active.

== See also ==
- Crips–Bloods gang war
- Gangs in Chicago
- History of African Americans in Chicago
