= BDK =

BDK may refer to:

- Big Daddy Kane, an American rapper
- Bank BDK, a former Polish bank
- Black Disciple Killer, term popularized by Lil JoJo in his song 3HunnaK
- Bruderschaft des Kreuzes, a professional wrestling stable in Chikara
- Budukh language (ISO-639-3 code)
- Bukkyo Dendo Kyokai, a Japanese organization devoted to translating and disseminating Buddhist literature
- Bundu dia Kongo, a politico-religious group in Bas Kongo, Democratic Republic of the Congo
- Federation of German Detectives (Bund Deutscher Kriminalbeamter)
- Quebec comics, called by some in the 1970s Bande dessinée kébécoise
- Brian De Keersmaecker, Belgian footballer
