= Javier Hernández (disambiguation) =

Javier Hernández (born 1988), nicknamed "Chicharito", is a Mexican striker.

Javier Hernández may also refer to:

== Arts and entertainment ==
- Javier Hernandez (comics) (born 1966), American comic book creator
- Javi Hernandez (Days of Our Lives), fictional character

== Politicians ==
- Héctor Javier Hernández (born 1958), Mexican politician
- Javier Hernández Manzanares (born 1960), Mexican politician
- Javier Barba-Hernández (died 1986), former lawyer turned enforcer
- Luis Javier Hernández Ortiz, Puerto Rican mayor

== Sportspeople ==
=== Association football ===
- Javier Hernández (footballer, born 1961), Mexican football midfielder and father of the Mexican striker
- Javi Hernández (footballer, born 1983), Spanish football centre-back
- Javi Hernández (footballer, born 1989), Spanish football attacking midfielder
- Javi Hernández (footballer, born 1998), Spanish football defender
- Javi Hernández (footballer, born 2000), Spanish football centre-back
- Javi Hernández (footballer, born 2004), Spanish football midfielder

=== Other sports ===
- Javier Hernández (wrestler) (born 1952), Mexican wrestler
- Jesús Javier Hernández Silva (1971–1993), nicknamed "Oro", Mexican wrestler
- Javier Hernández Aguiran (born 1979), Spanish Paralympic swimmer and sports journalist
- Javier Hernández (sailor) (born 1983), Spanish sailor
- Javier Hernández (kickboxer) (born 1989), Spanish kickboxer
- Javier Hernández Maradiaga (born 1988), Honduran swimmer

== See also ==
- Jay Hernandez (born 1978), American actor
- Xavi Hernández (born 1980), Spanish football manager and former midfielder
- Javi Chino (birth name Francisco Javier Hernández González, born 1987), Spanish footballer
- Xavier Hernandez (baseball), American baseball player
