= FBG Duck =

American rapper and songwriter (1993–2020)

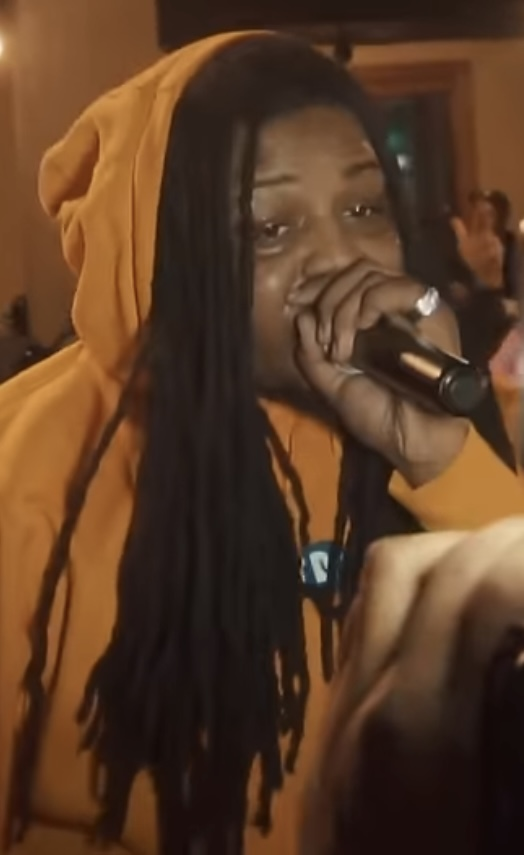
- Weekly in 2019

Background information
- Also known as: Big Clout
- Born: Carlton Dequan Weekly-Williams; December 6, 1993; Chicago, Illinois, U.S.
- Died: August 4, 2020 (aged 26) Chicago, Illinois, U.S.
- Cause of death: Murder (multiple gunshot wounds)
- Genres: Midwestern hip-hop; drill
- Occupations: Rapper; songwriter
- Instrument: Vocals
- Works: FBG Duck discography
- Years active: 2011–2020
- Labels: Clout Boyz; Columbia
- Formerly of: Fly Boy Gang
- Partner: Kori Harvey (2014); Dateisha House (2017–April 2020); Cashae Williams (2020; his death)
- Children: 4

Carlton Dequan Weekly-Williams (December 6, 1993 – August 4, 2020), known professionally as FBG Duck, (Note: /ˌɛfˌbiˈdʌk/ EF-bee-GEE-DUK) was an American rapper. He rose to prominence in the early 2010s in Chicago's drill music scene. His gritty lyrics and aggressive style often reflected his experiences with street life and gang rivalries. He gained a following for his controversial diss tracks and high‑profile feuds.

Born in Chicago, Illinois, Weekly-Williams began releasing music in 2011 on YouTube and SoundCloud. After self-releasing his debut mixtape Look at Me (2013), he saw further recognition with his 2017 single "Slide", which led him to sign with Columbia Records. Later that year, a remix featuring 21 Savage was released, receiving gold certification by the Recording Industry Association of America (RIAA).

Throughout his career, FBG Duck was involved in controversies related to his gang affiliations and the provocative content of his music. His lyrics frequently included disses aimed at rival gangs, such as the O-Block set of the Black Disciples. On August 4, 2020, at the age of 26, FBG Duck was fatally shot in a targeted attack in Chicago's Gold Coast neighborhood. Six suspects were arrested and, in 2024, convicted of his murder, receiving life sentences without parole.

== Early life ==
Carlton Dequan Weekly was born on December 6, 1993, in Chicago, Illinois. He was the son of Carl "Rafael" Weekly, an activist who served 27 years in prison, and LaSheena Weekly. He spent his early years with his mother in the Bronzeville neighborhood's Ida B. Wells Homes public housing project. Weekly later recalled in a XXL interview having rap battles with his cousins in his grandmother's basement when he was 10, which inspired his interest in hip-hop.

In 2005, he lost a cousin to police violence, an event he later said left him angry and “a problem child”, prone to fights and trouble-making. In 2008, Weekly and his family moved to Woodlawn on Chicago's South Side. Three years later, the 2011 shooting death of his close friend Shondale “Tooka” Gregory led him to affiliate with the St. Lawrence 063 (“Tookaville”) faction of the Gangster Disciples.

Weekly attended Hyde Park Academy High School. In an interview with Power 92.3 in 2014, he explained the creation of the group's name FBG, stating "We came up with the name because we all used to think we was so fly." Duck's nickname originated from the movie The Five Heartbeats, his mother affectionately called him "Duck" due to the shape of his lips when he was born, which reminded her of a duck.

== Career ==
Weekly began his music career in mid-2011 under the stage name FBG Duck, releasing his debut mixtape, Look at Me, on September 12, 2013. Hosted by DJ Cortez, DJ Shon and DJ Suspence, the project featured the single "Right Now". Over the next two years he released the mixtape Clout Life with Billionaire Black on September 8, 2014, and followed it with Different Personalities on August 14, 2015.

On October 31, 2016, FBG Duck self-released the mixtape This How I'm Coming, which he followed with This How I'm Coming 2 on December 9, 2017. The lead single "Slide" which quickly went viral, later earning RIAA Gold certification. A remix featuring 21 Savage appeared on March 2, 2018, further expanding his audience. On October 12, 2018, he issued his first studio album, Big Clout, which peaked at number 22 on Billboard's Heatseekers Albums chart and spawned the singles "Mama's House" and "Batman". On October 16, 2018, FBG Duck single "Big Clout" from his studio album Big Clout was included in The Fader's list of "10 songs you need in your life this week." It features FBG Young, and FBG Dutchie on the tracks. The album is a notable entry in the drill music scene, featuring Duck's lyricism that reflect his life experiences in Chicago's South Side. Big Clout is in the drill and trap music sound. Collaborations with FBG Young and FBG Dutchie, while producers Malcolm Flex, d.a. doman, and Bilbo Beatz. Standout tracks like "Mama's House" and the title track "Big Clout".

FBG Duck released the mixtape This How I'm Coming 3 on February 8, 2019. "Exposing Me (Remix)" with Rooga arrived on March 13, 2019; "In My Mode" followed on May 29, 2019; "Juice" on August 10, 2019; "Freestyle" on November 2, 2019; and "Chicago Legends" on November 14, 2019, in which he paid tribute to fallen Chicago artists such as Lil JoJo, Young Pappy, ZackTV and Lil Marc. In 2020 he released "Rich Dream" on January 5, 2020, then "I'm From 63rd" on March 2, 2020, and "Terrified" on March 15, 2020. His final single, "Dead Bitches", was released on July 10, 2020, and was controversial for targeting rival O-Block members, including T-Roy and Odee.

Following his death, his single "Like That" was released on August 7, 2020. His mixtape He Back was released on September 15, 2020. A collaborative album with Lil Chris titled Southwest was released on November 30, 2020.

== Musical style ==
FBG Duck's music was established in the drill subgenre, described by its dark, aggressive beats and lyrics. His style detailed street life, violence, and personal struggles. Bo Deal, his mentor, likened him to "the DMX of drill" for his energy. Influenced by Jay-Z, he brought unique to his tracks, blending trap elements with gangsta rap themes. His success single "Slide" represented this way, with its intimidating production and confrontational lyrics.

=== Public image and feuds ===
FBG Duck's public image was defined by his unapologetic persona and association with the Fly Boy Gang, which gave rise to intense rivalries within Chicago's drill scene. Among his most prominent feuds were conflicts with members of the Black Disciples, particularly after the release of "Dead Bitches," a single that taunted deceased rivals. Federal investigators noted that diss tracks between Duck and O-Block artists "fueled violence on the streets," with a reported $100,000 bounty placed on his life. His mother, LaSheena Weekly, rejected portrayals of her son as solely a gang figure, emphasizing his role as a father of four and his efforts to leave street life behind.

== Other ventures ==
=== Fly Boy Gang ===
Fly Boy Gang (FBG), also referred to as Clout Boyz or Tooka Gang, is a Chicago-based drill collective established in 2009 by FBG Duck alongside childhood friends FBG Young and FBG Dutchie. Originating from the Woodlawn neighborhood on Chicago's South Side, the group emerged in the city's drill movement during the early 2010s. Affiliated with the STL/EBT faction of the Gangster Disciples, Fly Boy Gang became known for its gritty sound and lyrics that described street life and rivalries, contributing to the evolution of drill culture.

The collective's name, "Fly Boy Gang," originated from the members' reputation for style and swagger during their teenage years. In a 2017 interview with VladTV, FBG Duck remarked, "We was fresh as hell... Why not be 'Fly Boy Gang'?... We fly, we boys." The group later adopted "Clout Boyz" as an alias, and "Tooka Gang" emerged as a tribute to their friend Shondale "Tooka" Gregory, killed in 2011. Fly Boy Gang's breakout moment came with FBG Duck's 2018 hit "Slide," and FBG Wooski 2018 hit "Computer Remix" which brought attention to the collective and cemented its status in the drill scene.

==== Current members ====
- FBG Young
- FBG Dutchie
- Lil Jay
- FBG Wooski
- FBG Butta

==== Former members ====
- FBG Duck (deceased)
- FBG Brick (deceased)
- FBG Cash (deceased)

=== Clout Boyz Entertainment ===
Clout Boyz Entertainment
- Parent company: Independent
- Founded: Early 2010s
- Founder: Fly Boy Gang
- Status: Active
- Distributor: Independent
- Genre: Hip hop • drill
- Country of origin: United States
- Location: Chicago, Illinois

Clout Boyz Entertainment is an independent record label and entertainment imprint launched by Fly Boy Gang in the early 2010s. The label's earliest release was "Murda" by FBG Young and FBG Dutchie in 2013. Clout Boyz Entertainment gained broader recognition with FBG Duck's 2018 single "Slide," a track that achieved mainstream success and was later remixed with 21 Savage. Other releases include FBG Wooski's "Computers Remix" (2018), a viral diss track, and FBG Young's mixtape Martian (2020).

==== Artists ====
- FBG Young
- FBG Dutchie
- Lil Jay
- FBG Wooski

==== Releases ====
- "Murda" (2013) – FBG Young & FBG Dutchie
- "Slide" (2018) – FBG Duck
- "Computers Remix" (2018) – FBG Wooski
- Martian (2020) – FBG Young
- "I'm from 63rd" (2020) - FBG Duck
- "Dead B*tches" (2020) - FBG Duck
- "B.O.N" (2020) - FBG wooski

== Cultural impact ==
FBG Duck popularized the term "clout" within Chicago's hip-hop culture, referring to himself as "Big Clout" and naming his clique and entertainment company "Clout Boyz Entertainment". The term, which gained widespread usage through his influence, describes a level of popularity or recognition achieved through viral social media posts or a reputation tied to money, violence, or music. In March 2024, music site Beats, Rhymes & Lists ranked FBG Duck No. 9 on its "The Best Chicago Drill Rappers of All Time" list.

Academic analyses, such as those by media scholar Jabari M. Evans, have cited Duck's career to explore how drill reflects the social forces driving gun violence while serving as an outlet for Black youth. Duck's music, which described life in the "Tookaville" neighborhood, became a symbol of both resistance and the harsh realities of Chicago's South Side, resonating with fans who saw him as a voice for their struggles.

== Personal life ==
Weekly was Christian. One of his younger sisters died in a 2014 apartment fire, and his older brother, Jermaine "FBG Brick" Robinson, was killed in 2017.

In 2014, FBG Duck was briefly romantically involved with Kori Harvey. Following their breakup, Harvey began dating Trey5, a member of the Black Disciples and brother of King Von and Bruh Bruh. According to Duck, Harvey stabbed him in the abdomen during their relationship. FBG Duck began a relationship with Dateisha House in 2017; the two remained together until their breakup in April 2020. Shortly afterward, he entered a relationship with Cashae Williams. Williams was with him at the time of his fatal shooting later that year and later testified at the trial.

=== Activism and community work ===
He partnered with Bo Deal's "2020 Vision" program, which used credible messengers to reduce violence and educate youth about COVID-19. In an Instagram video posted shortly before his death, he condemned shootings in front of children, expressing fear of being killed in front of his own. He called for a better path for young people. Duck also supported peace initiatives on Chicago's South Side, donated to families affected by gun violence, and collaborated with local organizers to distribute school supplies and meals during the summer of 2020. Friends speaking to The TRiiBE said that Duck "was trying to change" and make a real break from street life and gang ties before his death.

== Murder and trial ==
On August 4, 2020, FBG Duck was shot and killed in Chicago's Gold Coast neighborhood at 4:26 p.m. The shooting occurred outside a Dolce & Gabbana store while he was shopping for a gift for his son. Duck was targeted in what appeared to be a gang-related attack, with four masked gunmen opening fire from two vehicles. He was struck 16 times and later died from his injuries at the hospital.

Mayor Lori Lightfoot labeled Duck a "gang member" and Chicago police warned of a potential "city-wide gang war," while claiming drill music was a public safety risk. This resulted in backlash from his family and supporters, who argued that such portrayals ignored systemic issues like poverty and inadequate emergency services. His mother, LaSheena Weekly, criticized officials for focusing on her son's image rather than addressing the 17-minute delay in medical aid after the shooting.

In October 2021, six suspects were arrested and tried in United States v. Liggins et al.:

- Charles "C Murda" Liggins
- Kenneth "Kenny Mac" Roberson
- Tacarlos "Los" Offerd
- Christopher "C Thang" Thomas
- Marcus "Muwop" Smart
- Ralph "Teezy" Turpin

On January 17, 2024, all six were convicted of murder in aid of racketeering and conspiracy to commit murder, receiving life sentences without parole.

Weekly's funeral service was held on August 19, 2020, at St. John Missionary Baptist Church in Joliet, Illinois.

=== Remembrance ===
A public memorial held on August 14, 2021, at the Oak Street shooting site drew hundreds of friends, family, and fans, where his mother, LaSheena Weekly, urged the community to reject retaliatory violence. During the 63rd Annual Grammy Awards, Weekly was included in the In Memoriam montage. Notably, Lil Durk included Duck in a tribute montage during his October 21, 2024, hometown concert in Chicago, despite ongoing legal disputes with Duck's mother, who sued Durk and King Von's estate over alleged involvement in Duck's murder.

== Discography ==
EP(s)

- Big Clout (2018)

Mixtape(s)

- Look At Me (2013)
- Different Personalities (2015)
- This How I'm Coming (2016)
- Different Personalities 2 (2017)
- Look At Me 2 (2017)
- This How I'm Coming 2 (2017)
- This How I’m Coming 3 (2019)

Posthumous release(s)

- He Back (2020)
- Southwest [with Lil Chris] (2020)
- From The Heart (2026)

Fly Boy Gang Mixtape(s)

- The St. Lawrence Lifestyle [FBG Duck, FBG Dutchie and FBG Young] (2010)
- It’s a Movement [FBG Duck, Billionaire Black, FBG Dutchie & FBG Young] (2012)
- Duck the World [FBG Duck, FBG Wooski and FBG Young] (2022)
- We From 63rd [FBG Cash, FBG Dutchie & FBG Young] (2022)

== See also ==
- List of murdered hip-hop musicians
