= José Manuel Martínez =

José Manuel Martínez may refer to:

- José Manuel Martínez (athlete)
- José Manuel Martínez (serial killer)
- Manel Martínez (José Manuel Martínez Bel, born 1992), Spanish footballer
- Manolo (footballer, born 1960) (José Manuel Martínez Toral), Spanish footballer
