= Arsen Bayrambekov =

Russian contract/serial killer

- Born: Arsen Salavatovich Bayrambekov; 30 August 1978; Makhachkala, Dagestan ASSR, RSFSR
- Convictions: Murder x6 Arms trafficking
- Penalty: 13 years and 2 months imprisonment (murders); 4 years imprisonment (arms trafficking)

Details
- Victims: 6
- Span of crimes: 2003–2014
- Country: Russia
- State: Sverdlovsk
- Date apprehended: 1 August 2015

Arsen Salavatovich Bayrambekov (Russian: Арсен Салаватович Байрамбеков; born 30 August 1978) is a Russian serial killer and contract killer who murdered six people in the Sverdlovsk Oblast in 2014. Despite the severity of his crimes, he managed to avoid a life term and was instead sentenced to 13 years and 2 months imprisonment.

== Early life ==
Very little is known about Bayrambekov's early life. Born in 1978 in Makhachkala, Dagestan ASSR, and from the age of six, the young Arsen was engaged in sports such as Muay Thai, which he eventually got the title of master. In the early 1990s, he dropped out of school due to military operations in Chechnya and the border regions of the North Caucasus, but later acquired a fake school certificate and diploma. According to Svyatoslav Ivanov, an investigator for the Sverdlovsk Oblast Investigative Committee, they were able to uncover said certificate and diploma after Bayrambekov's arrest, but were unable to uncover in what field he actually graduated in.

In 1999, Bayrambekov took a job in the border security of Makhachkala's Department of Internal Affairs, and in the same year, he took part in a counter-terrorist operation in Kadar. The following year, he resigned from this position and moved to Yekaterinburg, Sverdlovsk Oblast, where he earned a living by manual labour. Bayrambekov himself claimed that throughout the 2000s he had a sports career, worked as a boxing coach in Yekaterinburg, was the Thai boxing champion of Dagestan, a prize-winner at the Russian championship, and had won the Sverdlovsk Oblast Thai boxing championship on several occasions, but no evidence of this was found. However, a photograph dating back to the mid-2000s depicting Bayrambekov was displayed at the Russian Muay Thai League's website.

== Murders ==
=== Contract killings ===
In 2003, Bayrambekov began doing criminal activities in Yekaterinburg after joining a gang run by a man named Ruslan Aliyev. That same year, a local businessman involved in the trucking industry paid Bayrambekov to kill a competitor. He agreed, and after borrowing an AK-47 from an acquaintance, he shot the victim near the entrance to a shopping centre. After the hit was carried out, Bayrambekov was paid $1,500.

Two years later, Bayrambekov was arrested on charges of illegal arms trafficking for attempting to sell two Kalashnikovs. He was convicted of this charge and received 4 years imprisonment, but was paroled in 2007.

On 17 November 2010, Bayrambekov committed his second contract killing. He was hired by a local businessman who traded food at a vegetable shop to eliminate a competitor, Shukhrat Khamrakulov, for 40,000 rubles. Bayrambekov shot the victim near the entrance of his house with a Makarov pistol, after which he fled the scene. His boss, Aliyev, acted as an intermediary for this killing.

=== Fascination with the occult ===
At around this time, Bayrambekov developed an interest in neo-paganism, in which it was obligatory to perform sacrifices. In order to improve his knowledge on the subject, he read many books and various publications on the internet, and in 2013, he met a man who became his spiritual mentor on the topic. At this time, he lived in a home in Kamyshevo, which he rented from an elderly woman living in Yekaterinburg. For the purpose of the sacrifices, Bayrambekov made an altar out of stones in the house's yard, where he sacrificed chickens, goats and cats, as well as alcohol and his own blood, which he got by pricking his finger with a needle.

Bayrambekov also developed an interest in entrepreneurship, opening up a magic shop in Yekaterinburg where he busied himself with treating with the help of reiki and fortune-telling on runes, supposedly to help people get out of difficult situations in life, but was not particularly successful financially. In 2014, Bayrambekov got acquainted with 43-year-old Tatyana Solovyova, a fellow practitioner of the occult whom he later realized shared his views and philosophy. And so, with her help, he eventually decided to start sacrificing human beings.

=== Ritual murders ===
Over the course of several months in 2014, Bayrambekov, with Solovyova's participation, committed four murders in the Yekaterinburg suburb of Verkhnyaya Pyshma. As victims, Bayrambekov chose homeless or other marginalized people whom he lured into his Volkswagen Polo. He then drove them to a location near Ganina Yama and killed them there, as he believed it to be the site of ancient pagan rituals and thus had strong spiritual energy. The murders were always committed at night, in a forest area, and involved setting a fire and making a circle with stones, as well as the reading of prayers.

Bayrambekov's first victim was a 20-year-old resident of Yekaterinburg who came from a poor family and made a living from washing car windows. He was lured by Bayrambekov and Solovyova into their car, ostensibly so he could be given a ride around the city. On the way, the company stopped at a store where Solovyova bought groceries and vodka. After that, Solovyova replaced Bayrambekov as the driver, who moved to the back seat with the young man. On the way to the forest, Bayrambekov forced the victim to drink vodka in the car. When they arrived, he attacked the young man, tying him up and gagging him. Bayrambekov then took the victim to an improvised altar, where he cut his throat during a ritual. After reciting prayers, he removed the victim's clothes and discarded his body into a nearby pit. Upon covering up the grave, Bayrambekov and Solovyova burned the victim's clothes in a fire and left.

Bayrambekov committed his next murder a few days later, luring into his car a friend of the previous victim - 23-year-old Denis Musin, a car window cleaner. Following the same pattern, Bayrambekov and Solovyova drove him to the forest, where they tied him up and stabbed him to death in a ritual at the same makeshift altar.

Not long after, Bayrambekov found the third victim on a street in Yekaterinburg. He was a 36-year-old man who lived with his mother, led a marginalized lifestyle and had a small income. After encountering the man, Bayrambekov picked up Solovyova, who helped load the drunk man into the car. They then took him to the forest, where Bayrambekov tied him up and stabbed him to death in a ritualistic manner.

The fourth and final victim was a resident of Yekaterinburg whom Bayrambekov came across at a public transportation stop. He offered the man a ride, and during the conversation, Bayrambekov offered the victim a drink, which he accepted. Along the way, Bayrambekov picked up Solovyova and then drove to the ritual site, where they killed the man in a similar manner to the previous victims.

== Arrest ==
After the murders of the first two victims, law enforcement in Yekaterinburg began a criminal investigation into the two men's disappearances led by the Fourth Investigative Department of Yekaterinburg. During investigations, some of the officers received a tip about one Tatyana Solovyova, who had told one of her acquaintances that the boys had been killed in the woods outside the city. Solovyova was then detained and soon cracked under pressure, admitting complicity and implicating Bayrambekov, who in turn was arrested on 1 August 2015.

Bayrambekov, with the assistance of his lawyers, proposed to the prosecutor's office to make a plea deal in exchange for leniency from the court, which was granted. As a result, he confessed to all crimes and willingly took part in investigative experiments, showing where he had buried the remains of his victims and where he had committed the murders.

During interrogations, Bayrambekov explained his motives for committing the murders, but could not explain what got him interested in occultism in the first place. After his arrest, a number of media outlets claimed that Bayrambekov, after committing the murders, dug up the corpses after a certain period of time and performed rituals on them in an attempt to revive them and turn them into zombies, but he himself denied this.

== Sentence and imprisonment ==
On 10 March 2017, Bayrambekov was found guilty of six murders and sentenced to 13 years and 2 months imprisonment. As his verdict was read out, he sat in silence and listened without eliciting any strong reaction, prompting a public outcry. However, the prosecutor's office and the local press service reiterated that this was all according to the plea deal he had made in exchange for revealing crucial information for the solving of the murders.

Bairambekov's accomplice Tatyana Solovyova was placed under house arrest after the criminal case was initiated, but after the verdict was announced to Arsen Bairambekov, she hid from the investigation and was put on the wanted list. In December 2017, law enforcement officers detained her at the airport while trying to cross the state border. In March 2018, the Verkhnepyshminsky City Court of the Sverdlovsk Region sentenced her to 12 years in prison, finding her guilty of aiding in the murder of four men.

== See also ==
- List of Russian serial killers
