= Earlimart, California =

Earlimart
- unincorporated community census-designated place
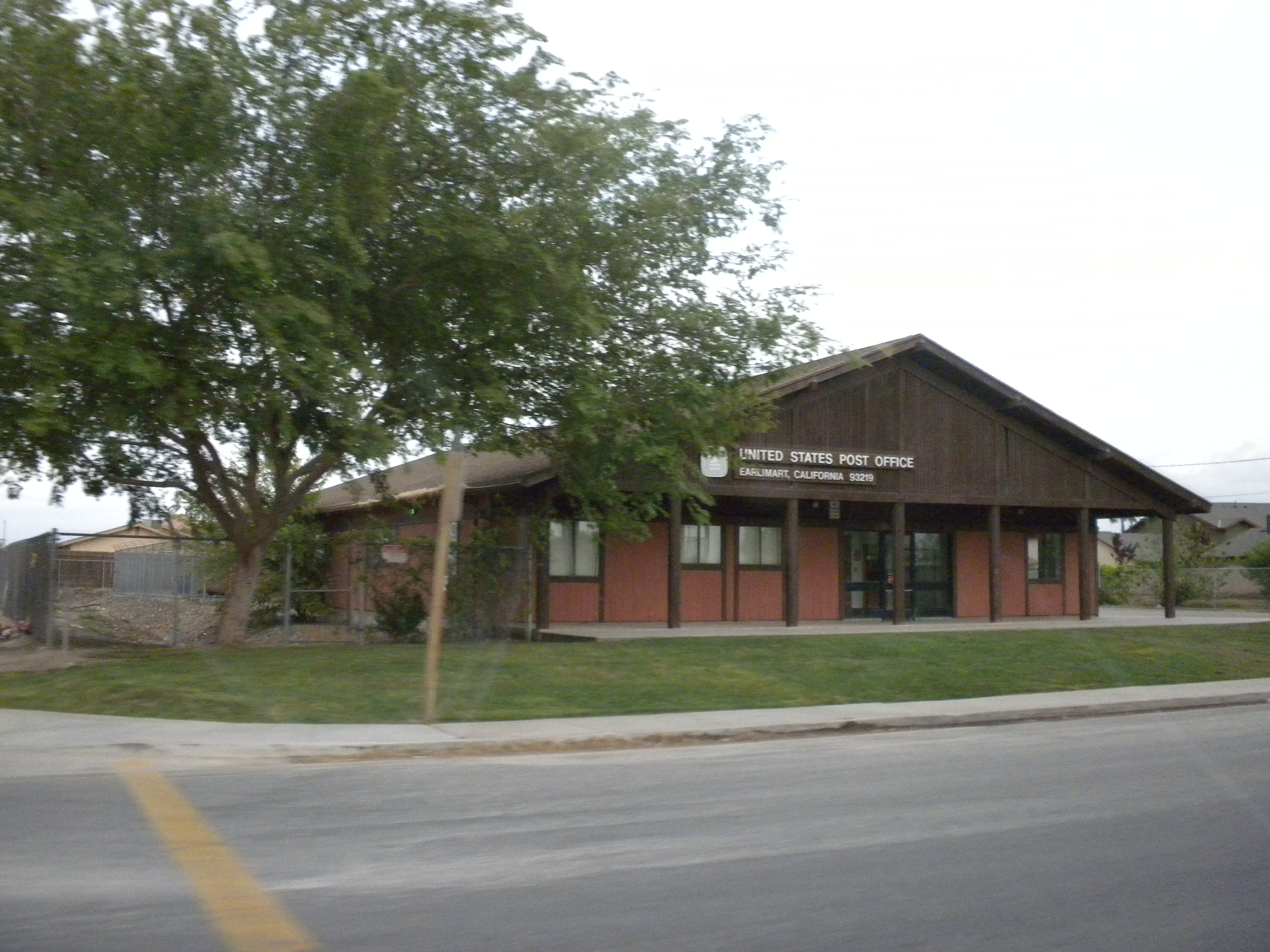
- Earlimart Post Office

- Location in Tulare County and the state of California

- Location in the United States
- Coordinates: 35°52′57″N 119°16′12″W
- Country: United States
- State: California
- County: Tulare

Area
  - Total: 2.90 sq mi (7.52 km^{2})
  - Land: 2.90 sq mi (7.52 km^{2})
  - Water: 0 sq mi (0.00 km^{2}) 0%
- Elevation: 282 ft (86 m)

Population (2020)
  - Total: 7,679
  - Density: 2,645.0/sq mi (1,021.23/km^{2})
- Time zone: UTC-8 (Pacific (PST))
  - Summer (DST): UTC-7 (PDT)
- ZIP code: 93219
- Area code: 661
- FIPS code: 06-20438
- GNIS feature ID: 1652700

Earlimart is an unincorporated community in Tulare County, California, United States. At the 2020 census, the CDP population was 7,679, down from 8,537 at the 2010 census. For statistical purposes, the Census Bureau defines Earlimart as a census-designated place (CDP).

== History ==
In the early 1890s, the Dalton Gang was accused and convicted of robbing a Southern Pacific Railroad train at Earlimart, when the community was known as Alila.

Community members changed its name to Earlimart in 1910, choosing that name because the variety of melons grown by local farmers ripened early, and thus were considered “early to market”—hence, “Earli-mart.” Tulare County's Earlimart branch library was established in October 1914 in the Alila School.

== Geography ==
According to the United States Census Bureau, the CDP has a total area of 2.9 square miles (7.5 km^{2}), all land.

== Demographics ==
Historical population
Census	Pop.	Note	%±
1950	2,162		—
1960	2,897		34.0%
1970	3,080		6.3%
1980	4,578		48.6%
1990	5,881		28.5%
2000	6,583		11.9%
2010	8,537		29.7%
2020	7,679		−10.1%
U.S. Decennial Census; 1860–1870 1880-1890; 1900 1910 1920; 1930 1940 1950; 1960 1970 1980; 1990 2000 2010

Earlimart first appeared as an unincorporated place in the 1950 U.S. census, and then as a census designated place in the 1980 U.S. census.

=== 2020 census ===
As of the 2020 census, Earlimart had a population of 7,679. The population density was 2,645.2 inhabitants per square mile (1,021.3/km^{2}). 97.3% of residents lived in urban areas, while 2.7% lived in rural areas.

Racial composition as of the 2020 census
Race	Number	Percent
White	1,243	16.2%
Black or African American	32	0.4%
American Indian and Alaska Native	94	1.2%
Asian	470	6.1%
Native Hawaiian and Other Pacific Islander	0	0.0%
Some other race	4,333	56.4%
Two or more races	1,507	19.6%
Hispanic or Latino (of any race)	7,045	91.7%

The census reported that 99.7% of the population lived in households, 20 people (0.3%) lived in non-institutionalized group quarters, and no one was institutionalized. There were 1,865 households, of which 59.5% had children under the age of 18 living in them. Of all households, 51.7% were married-couple households, 14.7% had a male householder with no spouse or partner present, and 25.6% had a female householder with no spouse or partner present. About 9.3% of all households were made up of individuals and 4.3% had someone living alone who was 65 years of age or older. The average household size was 4.11. There were 1,628 families (87.3% of all households).

The age distribution was 33.8% under the age of 18, 12.6% aged 18 to 24, 24.0% aged 25 to 44, 20.7% aged 45 to 64, and 9.0% who were 65 years of age or older. The median age was 28.1 years. For every 100 females, there were 96.4 males, and for every 100 females age 18 and over there were 96.6 males age 18 and over.

There were 1,928 housing units at an average density of 664.1 units per square mile (256.4 units/km^{2}), of which 1,865 (96.7%) were occupied and 3.3% were vacant. Of the occupied units, 50.5% were owner-occupied and 49.5% were occupied by renters. The homeowner vacancy rate was 0.4% and the rental vacancy rate was 1.8%.

=== Demographic estimates ===
In 2023, the US Census Bureau estimated that 42.0% of the population were foreign-born. Of all people aged 5 or older, 9.3% spoke only English at home, 84.3% spoke Spanish, and 6.4% spoke Asian or Pacific Islander languages. Of those aged 25 or older, 43.8% were high school graduates and 3.5% had a bachelor's degree.

=== Income and poverty ===
The median household income was $51,343, and the per capita income was $14,319. About 20.9% of families and 20.4% of the population were below the poverty line.

=== 2010 census ===
At the 2010 census Earlimart had a population of 8,537. The population density was 4,052.8 inhabitants per square mile (1,564.8/km^{2}). The racial makeup of Earlimart was 3,193 (37.4%) White, 67 (0.8%) African American, 45 (0.5%) Native American, 536 (6.3%) Asian, 0 (0.0%) Pacific Islander, 4,303 (50.4%) from other races, and 393 (4.6%) from two or more races. Hispanic or Latino people of any race were 7,805 persons (91.4%).

The whole population lived in households, no one lived in non-institutionalized group quarters and no one was institutionalized.

There were 1,946 households, 1,350 (69.4%) had children under the age of 18 living in them, 1,201 (61.7%) were opposite-sex married couples living together, 369 (19.0%) had a female householder with no husband present, 166 (8.5%) had a male householder with no wife present. There were 169 (8.7%) unmarried opposite-sex partnerships, and 3 (0.2%) same-sex married couples or partnerships. 174 households (8.9%) were one person and 86 (4.4%) had someone living alone who was 65 or older. The average household size was 4.39. There were 1,736 families (89.2% of households); the average family size was 4.57.

The age distribution was 3,416 people (40.0%) under the age of 18, 1,044 people (12.2%) aged 18 to 24, 2,234 people (26.2%) aged 25 to 44, 1,334 people (15.6%) aged 45 to 64, and 509 people (6.0%) who were 65 or older. The median age was 23.5 years. For every 100 females, there were 105.3 males. For every 100 females age 18 and over, there were 104.1 males.

There were 2,023 housing units at an average density of 960.4 per square mile, of the occupied units 1,010 (51.9%) were owner-occupied and 936 (48.1%) were rented. The homeowner vacancy rate was 1.0%; the rental vacancy rate was 2.1%. 4,590 people (53.8% of the population) lived in owner-occupied housing units and 3,947 people (46.2%) lived in rental housing units.

== Government ==
In the California State Legislature, Earlimart is in the 16th senatorial district, represented by Democrat Melissa Hurtado, and in the 33rd Assembly district, represented by Republican Alexandra Macedo.

In the United States House of Representatives, Earlimart is in California's 22nd congressional district, represented by Republican David Valadao.

== Education ==
Earlimart is in the Earlimart Elementary School District and the Delano Joint Union High School District.

== Notable people ==
- Dack Rambo - actor known for work on television's Dallas and Another World and film Which Way to the Front?
- José Manuel Martínez - serial killer and hitman for Mexican drug cartels
