= Gakirah Barnes =

American gangster (1997–2014)

- Barnes in an Unconfirmed dated photograph
- Born: January 21, 1997
- Died: April 11, 2014 (aged 17); Woodlawn, Chicago, U.S.
- Cause of death: Shooting
- Other names: KI; Kirah; Lil Snoop
- Years active: 2011–2014
- Organization: Gangster Disciples gang

Gakirah Barnes, known as K.I. (January 21, 1997 – April 11, 2014), was an American gangster affiliated with the Gangster Disciples gang in Chicago, Illinois. Allegedly, she killed numerous people between 2011 and 2014.

Barnes was shot and killed in the Woodlawn area on April 11, 2014, after posting her location on Twitter.

== Early life and education ==
Barnes grew up in the Woodlawn area on Chicago's South Side, an area known for violence. Barnes' father was shot and killed before her first birthday, and two of her close friends were also killed during her childhood. She finished middle school at Perspectives/IIT Math & Science Academy and returned for a freshman year of high school before being arrested for a firearm discharge and put in a youth detention center. Barnes was introduced to the Gangster Disciples street gang by a group of boys when she was 14, and she would join the "St. Lawrence Boys" faction.

=== Gang activity ===
From age 14 to 17, Barnes was a prominent partaker in gang activity on Chicago's South Side with the "St. Lawrence Boys" faction of the Gangster Disciples street gang. She allegedly shot and killed multiple people between 2011 and 2014, including rival Black Disciples gang member Odee Perry whom "O Block" was informally named after.

== Death ==
=== Twitter communication and shooting ===
A 2016 study produced by Columbia University found that Barnes utilized the social media platform Twitter often, posting over 27,000 tweets from 2011 until April 2014. On April 11, 2014, Barnes tweeted a photo of herself and her friends on the porch of a home in the Woodlawn neighborhood. At around 3:30 pm CDT, hours after tweeting the photo, Barnes was shot on in the Woodlawn neighborhood, blocks away from the location where she had taken the tweeted photo and three blocks from where she had lived. She was pronounced dead at a hospital by the Cook County Medical Examiner at 5:43 pm CDT, due to bullet wounds in her jaw, chest, and neck areas. A paper published in the journal Nature noted that the tweet Barnes had posted of her location may have been a contributing factor in her death.

Rapper and Black Disciples gang member Dayvon "King Von" Bennett was named as the killer. On April 11, 2019, a TV series on Barnes' life and killing premiered on A&E, titled Secret Life of a Gang Girl: The Untold Story. In 2021, unsealed documents released by the Chicago Police Department named Bennett as Barnes' killer.

Barnes' killing intensified the already violent feud between the STL/EBT (Gangster Disciples) and O'Block (Black Disciples) factions, sparking further retaliatory shootings and years of online and musical taunting. Federal prosecutors later cited this widened conflict as part of the context leading up to the 2020 murder of rapper FBG Duck.

== See also ==
- Gangster Disciples–Black Disciples conflict

== Notes, citations, and sources ==
=== Sources ===
- Patton, Desmund U.; Lane, Jeffery; Leonard, Patrick; Macbeth, Jamie; Smith Lee, Jocelyn R. (January 2016). "Gang violence on the digital street: Case study of a South Side Chicago gang member's Twitter communication". Columbia University. 19 (7). New York City: 1000–1018. doi:10.1177/1461444815625949.
