= RentAHitman.com =

Satirical website

- Screenshot of RentAHitman.com on August 17, 2024
- Founded: 2005; 21 years ago
- Headquarters: Northern California
- Country of origin: United States
- Founder: Bob Innes
- Website: https://rentahitman.com/

RentAHitman.com is a satirical website purporting to offer contract killers for hire. The site's domain name was bought by Bob Innes in 2005 as a potential site for an information technology company to be set up with his friends (playing on the use of the word "hit" as a check on a website's security or the count of web traffic). The company was never started, but Innes retained the site. Upon checking the site's email inbox in 2008, he found hundreds of messages requesting contract killing services, but he considered none to be serious. When checking again in 2010, however, he found a serious request from a woman in Canada. He passed her details to the police, and she was convicted of soliciting murder.

Afterwards, Innes converted RentAHitman.com to a supposed front for a contract killing agency, though he included numerous jokes in its content to clearly signal the site is a parody. Despite this, Innes's site has resulted in several further convictions for those attempting to employ the supposed services, as he checks messages sent to him and refers any serious requests to law enforcement agencies.

== Origin ==
RentAHitman.com was bought and registered by Bob Innes of Northern California on February 5, 2005, for US$9.20. Innes had graduated from the Napa Valley police academy in 1999. Upon graduation, Innes had failed to find employment; instead, he turned to a career in information technology. He established the website with a group of friends on an IT training program. The domain name was the possible location for a website for a company the friends would set up for a service either testing companies' online security measures (by carrying out "hits" on them) or for a service optimizing web traffic (i.e. increasing the number of hits). At the time, Innes was also collecting domain names in the hope of selling them later for a profit. Innes and his friends graduated in June 2005 and went their separate ways, without forming a company. Innes retained ownership of the domain name and put it up for auction, but received no offers. He continued to maintain the domain in the hope of selling it in the future.

== Creation of site ==
Innes checked the email inbox he had associated with the website in 2008 and found he had 250–300 messages requesting the services of contract killers or asking for employment in the field. Many were jokey in nature, and he did not find any of them alarming. When he checked again in 2010, he found a message from a woman in Canada named Helen Kaplan. She requested that he carry out the murders of three of her family members in the United Kingdom, claiming they had cheated her out of an inheritance. Innes considered this request the first serious one he had received, as it gave the names and addresses of the targets. He passed the details onto a friend who was a California police sergeant. The case was passed to the Canadian police, who arrested Kaplan. She served four months in a Canadian prison for soliciting murder before being extradited to the United Kingdom, where she was wanted on other serious charges.

After this case, Innes decided to continue to run the website and to rebrand it as a fake contract killing agency. He filled the site with jokes and clues that it was not legitimate. These included fake testimonials from satisfied customers and a claim that he is regulated by the "Hitman Information Privacy Protection Act", a play on the Health Insurance Portability and Accountability Act with which he was familiar through his work in medical IT. The site claims the agency has "17,985 field operatives", which is actually the approximate number of American law enforcement agencies; the site also offers discounts for groups, seniors, "spring cleaning", and Air National Guardsmen. In 2014, Innes added a "service request form"; said form requires a user's names, email address and phone number. Innes uses the nom de plume "Guido Fanelli" on the site and for responses to inquiries.

Innes received around 8–10 requests a month, for a total of around 700 by November 2021, including 400 via his service request form. He removes obvious joke entries, but replies to any inquiries that he considers to be serious. Innes allows clients a 24-hour cooling-off period; after which, he asks two questions: "Do you still require our services? And would you like me to place you in contact with a field operative for a free consultation?". If they reply in the affirmative, Innes passes their details onto law enforcement. Innes passes all requests involving minors to the police immediately. Innes considers the site "a magnet for low-hanging fruit that are out there trying to harm other people" and said "I really didn't think that people were gonna be that stupid. Boy, did they show me." He covers all costs to keep the site running, though he accepts donations. After receiving several emails from people who wished to be hired as hitmen, Innes added a "Careers" page to the website, with a fake employment application.

== Prosecutions ==
Innes thinks that around 10% of enquiries to the site result in a police investigation; he also considers that he has saved around 150 lives through the site. For a time, Innes received a lot of enquiries from Indonesia as a result of his site being mentioned in an Indonesian YouTube video about the dark web. Innes thinks that around a dozen people have been arrested as a result of the website. There have been at least a few notable cases. Notable cases include the 2018 case of Devon Fauber, who wanted to hire a hitman to kill his ex-girlfriend and her parents before kidnapping his three-year-old daughter. Some 10 days after initial contact, Fauber got back in touch with Innes to ask "How come the job’s not done yet?". Fauber was found guilty of two counts of solicitation to commit murder and sentenced to 10 years imprisonment in 2019. In July 2020, Wendy Wein was arrested for using the site to try to arrange the killing of her ex-husband. She was found guilty of solicitation of murder and using a computer to commit a crime.
