= Kidd Kenn =

American rapper (born 2003)

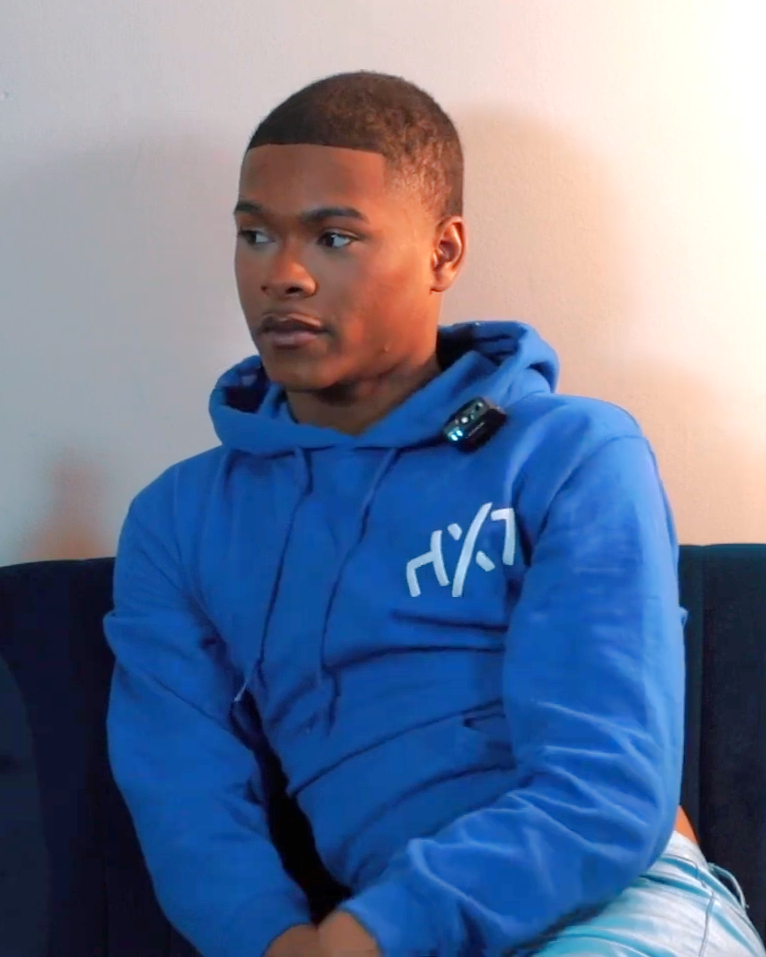
- Kidd Kenn in 2023

Background information
- Born: Dontrell Smith; January 16, 2003 (age 23); Chicago, Illinois, U.S.
- Genres: Hip hop; trap
- Occupations: Rapper; singer; songwriter
- Years active: 2018–present
- Labels: Island; UME; 4th & B'way; Def Jam
- Website: kiddkennworld.com

Dontrell Smith (born January 16, 2003), known professionally as Kidd Kenn, is an American rapper and singer from Chicago, Illinois. He rose to prominence with his singles "No Brakes" and "Moves" (featuring Rico Nasty).

== Early life ==
Dontrell Smith was born on January 16, 2003, in the Chatham neighborhood on the South Side, Chicago. He dropped out of high school during his freshman year. During the COVID-19 pandemic, he moved to Los Angeles, where he took on great responsibilities, paying bills and doing everything on his own. This situation led him to start making song covers, which eventually provoked him to take his rap career seriously.

== Career ==
Kidd Kenn's first released track, "Eriod", served as his debut commercial single, accompanied by a music video. After the success of his hit single "No Brakes", which received millions of streams across various platforms, he considered rapping as a full-time career. On August 11, 2018, Kenn released his debut mixtape, Childish, featuring a guest verse from Katie Got Bandz.

A year later, Smith's career began to take off with his hit singles, leading to his signing with Island Records. After signing a recording deal, he released his second mixtape, Child's Play, in 2020. In September 2020, he released "Freestyle", featuring Delli Boe, accompanied by a music video. On June 11, 2021, he released his debut extended play, Problem Child. Since then, he has collaborated with Rico Nasty on the song "Moves". On October 5, 2021, Kidd Kenn made history by appearing as the first gay male rapper in the BET Hip Hop Awards Rap Cypher, performing alongside Toosii, Lakeyah, Symba, and DJ Hed. On May 20, 2022, he released the song "Body" as a promotional single for his EP Celebrating Pride, which later became the lead single. On June 17, 2022, Kenn released his single "At It Again", a collaboration with Belize singer Delli Boe, accompanied by a music video.

On June 29, 2022, Kidd Kenn released a single titled "Want Not A Need" featuring Baby Tate. He also released an EP titled Celebrating Pride that same year. After the release, he went on to release another extended play titled Grown in July 2022. In August 2022, Kidd Kenn released a cover version of "Old Town Road" by Lil Nas X, lending a glamorous, feminine touch to the song. In December 2022, Grown was ranked at number 16 on The Triibe's 25 best Chicago hip hop and R&B albums of 2022. He released his fifth EP, Busy Being Bad, on October 20, 2023.

== Discography ==
=== Mixtapes ===
List of mixtapes, with selected details
Title	Mixtape details
Childish	Released: August 11, 2018; Label: Fam1st Music Group; Formats: Digital download, streaming
Child's Play	Released: February 14, 2020; Label: Island Records; Formats: Digital download, streaming

=== Extended plays ===
List of extended plays, with selected details
Title	Extended play details
Problem Child	Released: June 11, 2021; Label: 4th & B'way, Island Records; Formats: Digital download, streaming
Celebrating Pride	Released: June 3, 2022; Label: 4th & B'way Records, Def Jam; Formats: Digital download, streaming
Grown	Released: July 22, 2022; Label: 4th & B'way Records, Def Jam Recordings; Formats: Digital download, streaming
Busy Being Bad	Released: October 20, 2023; Label: 4th & B'way Records, Def Jam Recordings; Formats: Digital download, streaming
