= Federation of German Detectives =

- Bund Deutscher Kriminalbeamter
- Abbreviation: BDK
- Founders: Günter Tausch and Willi Knop
- Legal status: trade union
- Location: Berlin, Germany
- Members: 15,000 (2010)
- Website: bdk.de

The Federation of German Detectives (German: Bund Deutscher Kriminalbeamter; BDK) is a professional association of criminal police officers in Germany. It was founded on 28 September in 1968 and represents about 15,000 people working in criminal investigation. The BDK cooperates with various national and international organizations such as Conseil Européen des Syndicats de Police (CESP) or Transparency International.

== Chairpersons ==
Since the founding there were the following chairpersons:

- 1969–1972: Johannes Reiter
- 1972–1978: Rolf Grunert
- 1978–1990: Ingo Herrmann
- 1990–2003: Eike Bleibtreu
- 2003–2011: Klaus Jansen
- 2011–2018: André Schulz
- 2018-2021: Sebastian Fiedler
- Since 2021: Dirk Peglow
