= Jeff Weiss (journalist) =

American music journalist and author

- Born: c. 1981–1982; Los Angeles, California
- Education: Occidental College
- Occupations: Journalist, music critic, author, editor
- Known for: Passion of the Weiss; Waiting for Britney Spears: A True Story, Allegedly

Jeff Weiss is an American journalist, music critic, and publisher. He started the independent music blog Passion of the Weiss and wrote the 2025 book Waiting for Britney Spears: A True Story, Allegedly.

Weiss began his career as a business journalist and freelance tabloid reporter. He later shifted his writing to music criticism, focusing on underground hip-hop and the effects of the criminal justice system on musicians. His work appears in The Washington Post, Rolling Stone, Pitchfork, and The New York Times. In 2017, Weiss helped organize an advertiser boycott of the LA Weekly after Semanal Media bought the paper. He then co-founded the print magazine The LAnd.

== Early life and education ==
Weiss grew up in Los Angeles, California. His grandfather moved to Los Angeles from New York. His father was a lawyer, and his mother ran a children's clothing store.

Weiss played high school baseball and went on to play college baseball at Occidental College. He read authors like Jack Kerouac and hip-hop magazines like The Source and Vibe. After college, he worked at a business newspaper for 15 months before becoming a full-time freelance writer in 2007.

== Career ==
=== Tabloid journalism ===
In the early 2000s, Weiss got a job as a freelance reporter for Star magazine through a Craigslist ad. He reported on celebrities and nightlife, often working with British photographer Mel Bouzad. In 2005, police arrested Weiss for trespassing on Brad Pitt's Malibu property. He was on assignment for People to confirm Pitt's relationship with Angelina Jolie. He was not charged with a crime. Weiss later said he regretted this work and called the arrest "the worst day of my entire life."

=== Passion of the Weiss ===
Weiss started the blog Passion of the Weiss in 2005. It began as a site for complaining about Los Angeles culture and changed into a music criticism site focused on underground hip-hop.

The blog reviewed artists such as Kendrick Lamar, Odd Future, Kevin Gates, and Frank Ocean before they became famous. The LA Weekly named it the Best Music Blog in Los Angeles.

Weiss launched a Patreon campaign in June 2018 to pay the site's writers. He also formed POW Recordings, an independent record label that released music by rappers like Chester Watson and Kent Loon. In September 2015, the blog held a 10-year anniversary concert at The Echo in Los Angeles. Open Mike Eagle, Boogie, and Nocando performed at the event.

=== Music criticism ===
Weiss wrote a music column for the LA Weekly for six years. In 2012, he traveled to Baton Rouge, Louisiana, to write about the murder trial of rapper Lil Boosie. He also wrote about the legal cases of Los Angeles rappers 03 Greedo and Drakeo the Ruler.

In October 2018, Weiss reviewed Post Malone's Posty Fest in Dallas for The Washington Post. He called the artist a "rhinestone cowboy who looks like he crawled out of a primordial swamp of nacho cheese." Fans sent Weiss death threats, and Post Malone's father argued with Weiss on Twitter. Post Malone later sent Weiss a direct message to apologize for the situation.

=== LA Weekly boycott ===
Semanal Media bought the LA Weekly in late 2017. The new owners fired most of the editorial staff without exit interviews. Weiss resigned. He and former film editor April Wolfe organized a boycott targeting the paper's advertisers. About 90 percent of the sponsors pulled their ads.

Weiss then co-founded The LAnd, an independent print magazine. The publication focused on Los Angeles politics and culture.

=== Waiting for Britney Spears ===
MCD, an imprint of Farrar, Straus and Giroux, published Weiss's first book, Waiting for Britney Spears: A True Story, Allegedly, in June 2025. The book mixes memoir and autofiction. It details his time as a tabloid reporter following Britney Spears up to the start of her conservatorship in 2008.

Weiss spent thousands of dollars buying old tabloid magazines on eBay from 2003 through 2007 to research the book. The New York Times reviewed the release. Weiss went on a national book tour and spoke at independent bookstores with authors like Caroline Calloway.

== Bibliography ==
- Waiting for Britney Spears: A True Story, Allegedly (MCD/Farrar, Straus and Giroux, 2025) ISBN 978-0374601447
