= Andrés Leonardo Achipiz =

Colombian murderer

- Born: July 5, 1994 (age 32); Bogotá, Colombia
- Other name: "The Fish"
- Conviction: Murder. assassination

Details
- Victims: 12 confirmed 30–35 claimed
- Span of crimes: 2009–2013
- Country: Colombia
- State: Bogotá
- Date apprehended: June 25, 2013
- Imprisoned at: La Picota Prison

Andrés Leonardo Achipiz (born July 5, 1994) is a Colombian paid assassin. He is known by the alias The Fish (Spanish: Pescadito), referring to his childhood where he sold fish in his neighborhood. He has claimed to have killed between 30 and 35 people in Bogotá, more specifically in Kennedy and Bosa, where he was paid on a scale ranging from $600,000 to $4,000,000 worth of pesos for each murder. He was convicted of 12 murders, but is suspected of several more.

He is incarcerated in La Picota Prison, in southeastern Bogotá.

According to specialists in criminology and psychiatry, Achipiz is a "murderer by vocation" and could not be resocialized. Psychiatrists have diagnosed him as a psychopath.

== Biography ==
Andrés Leonardo Achipiz was born in 1994 and grew up in the Britalia neighborhood, located in the Bogotá's southwest, after his parents moved from Huila to the capitol in search of a better life. He is the second of six children, with his parents enrolling him in El Gran Britalia school. He dropped out in the 6th grade of high school because he decided to work for his father as a street vendor, selling fruits and fish. According to his own confession, his father was physically and emotionally abusive, who required of him a minimum amount of money for the sales' performance.

He began to steal from various houses north of Bogotá with other youths, where he obtained large sums of money, but also stole valuables such as watches, wallets, bicycles, etc. At the age of 16, he was contacted by a well-known Bogotá criminal, who worked with hired killers in the drug micro-trafficking trade, known by the alias of "Camilo". As an active member of a criminal gang, Achipiz worked in the small-scale illicit drug trade in Kennedy and Bosa. Achipiz killed his victims with firearms or sharp objects.

In 2009, he was arrested and sent to a youth detention center for two murders. However, he later escaped from prison during a riot.

Achipiz was widely known in the aforementioned towns of Bogotá, which is why he was contacted by other gangs to work as a sicario, or hired assassin. He typically charged between one and six million pesos.

He was captured on June 25, 2013, on a bus, after being intercepted by specialized agents.

== Pathology ==
According to the Association of Psychiatrists of Latin America, Achipiz was diagnosed with a "psychopathic personality disorder, that is, he is prone to circumvent the norms and to attack others." It was also pointed out that he lacked feelings of guilt and that, in general, the abuse suffered from childhood and adolescence, as well as the lack of affection from the family, contributed to his pathology.

Belisario Valbuena, criminal profiler and official of the Manuela Beltrán University in Bogotá, also assured that in this type of person "the medical and psychological treatments are insufficient". For this reason, the use of correctional facilities and prisons were indispensable as control measures. Achipiz was also compared with American criminal Richard Kuklinski, who in his childhood, also suffered physical and emotional abuse at the hands of his parents. Finally, he was described as a "murderer by vocation".
