= Héctor Orlando Bastidas =

Colombian hitman and gang member

Héctor Orlando Bastidas aka "Bonito" (from Putumayo) is a Colombian criminal, gang member and hitman. According to the Colombian authorities, Bastidas is a "serial killer who spread terror in the south of the country, after putting himself at the service of criminal gangs and the FARC."

Bastidas was the head of a criminal group which called itself 'The Constru', operating in the Putumayo Department, under the modality of selective hiring and extortion. He remained an active member of this organization from 2011 to 2015, the year in which he was captured by the DIJIN (Judicial Investigation Section) in Pitalito, Huila.

Known by his aliases Bonito and El señor de la B, he is believed to have committed between 100 and 160 homicides.

== Crimes ==
According to law enforcement, Bastidas was allied with various drug traffickers, gangs, and criminal organizations such as Los Rastrojos and various fronts of the FARC, including the 48th and 34th fronts. Bastidas and his criminal gang were responsible for 65% of all crimes and murders that were perpetrated in Putumayo in 2014. At that time, he was one of the most feared killers in the region and was guarded by approximately 20 guerrillas, who were his private security guards and fellow FARC members.

The vast majority of the killings were done because of non-payment of revolutionary taxes and others for reckoning. As a criminal group, they processed close to 1,000 kilograms of cocaine a month, which they distributed and marketed throughout the country and also to the USA.

One of Bastidas' most notorious crimes was the murder of the manager of the Agrarian Bank of Colombia, Luz Milena Álvarez Delgado, on October 3, 2013. Álvarez Delgado worked in Valle del Guamuez. In addition, Héctor was also responsible for the death of her husband.

== Capture ==
In 2015, Bastidas was captured in Pitalito, Huila, after an operation led by DIJIN agents. At the time of his capture, several vehicles were seized, including several ATVs, also weapons and $40,000,000 Colombian pesos in cash.

He is currently detained in La Picota Prison, in Bogotá.

== Bibliography ==
- Villamarín Pulido, Luis Alberto (2020). Farc: Drug trafficking and terrorism cartel. Part III (2007-2017). ISBN 9780463297100.
