= Cino (disambiguation) =

Cino is a comune in the province of Sondrio in Italy.

"Cino" may also refer to:

- Cino da Pistoia (1270-1336), an Italian jurist and poet
  - "Cino", a 1908 poem about Cino da Pistoia by Ezra Pound
- Cino Del Duca (1899-1967), an Italian-French businessman
- Cino Cinelli (1916-2001), an Italian cyclist
- Daud Yordan (born 1987), an Indonesian boxer nicknamed "Cino"
- Beppe Cino (born 1947), Italian director and screenwriter
- Chief innovation officer (CINO), responsible for managing the innovation process inside an organization
