= José Manuel Martínez (serial killer) =

Mexican-American hitman (born 1962)

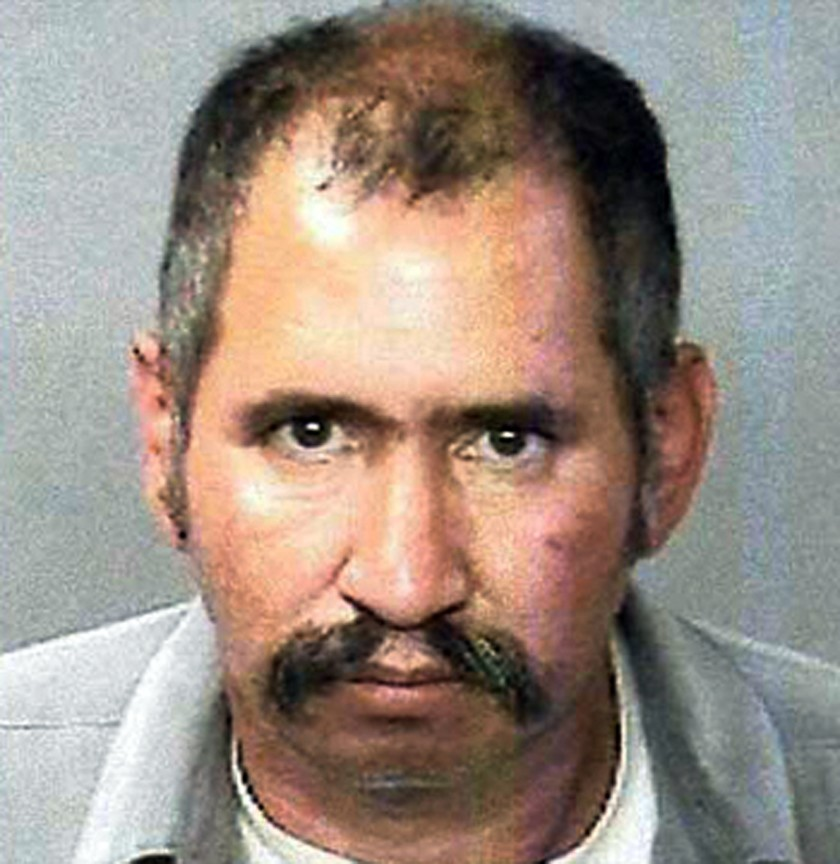
- Undated mug shot of Martínez taken by Tulare County Sheriff Department
- Born: June 13, 1962 (age 64); Fresno, California, U.S.
- Other name: "El Mano Negra"
- Years active: 1978–2013
- Convictions: First-degree murder (12 counts); Attempted murder (1 count)
- Penalty: Ten life sentences

Details
- Victims: 12 convicted (36 claimed)
- States: Alabama, California, and Florida (convicted); 9 others (claimed)
- Date apprehended: May 17, 2013

José Manuel Martínez (born June 13, 1962), dubbed El Mano Negra ("The Black Hand"), is a Mexican-American former self-described drug cartel hitman. Martínez confessed to an estimated 36 murders and was sentenced to life in prison after being convicted of murder in multiple states. He is incarcerated at USP Victorville in California.

== Crimes ==
Martínez was arrested in May 2013 for the murder of Jose Ruiz, a friend of his daughter's boyfriend, after he had insulted her several months before. During his interrogation by Alabama authorities, Martínez confessed to killing 36 people across at least 12 states. All of his victims were adult men, with the exception of one attempted victim that was a 17-year-old boy. Martínez said that most of his murders were related to debts to Mexican drug cartels. He may have killed more than 30 people in over 32 years.

== Trials ==
In Alabama, Martínez pled guilty to one count of murder for the death of Jose Ruiz in March 2013 and was sentenced to 50 years in prison. In California, he pleaded guilty to nine counts of murder in October 2015, and was sentenced to life in prison without parole.

The June 2019 trial in Florida for two counts of murder lasted three weeks. The jury deliberated for three hours before deciding that Martínez would not face the death penalty, which was sought by the state prosecution, and would instead face two consecutive life sentences. Over a dozen of Martínez's family members testified on his behalf, sharing stories describing the sacrifices he made to protect his siblings and trips to Disneyland where he took his children and grandchildren. His defense lawyer for his Alabama court case, Thomas Turner, described him as "polite and a likeable individual", and another lawyer, John Spivey, said that it came down to two visions of Martínez, the "cold killer" vs the "truly dedicated father, uncle, grandfather," and that in the end, "the human side outweighed the monster side".

== Victims ==
In addition to the murder of Ruiz in Alabama, Martínez was convicted of the following murders:

- David Bedolla, 23 - October 21, 1980, between Lindsay and Strathmore
- Sylvester Ayon, 30 - October 1, 1982, near Santa Ynez
- Raul Gonzalez, 22 - October 19, 1982, east of Porterville
- Domingo Perez, 29 - April 8, 1995, north of Richgrove
- Santiago Perez, 56 - February 14, 2000, Pixley
- Javier Huerta, 20 - November 2006, Ocala National Forest
- Gustavo Olivares, 28 - November 2006, Ocala National Forest
- Jose Alvarado, 25 - February 15, 2007, outside of McFarland
- Juan Bautista Moreno, 52 - March 23, 2009, near McFarland
- Joaquin Barragan, 45 - September 30, 2009, east of Earlimart
- Gonzalo Urquieta - February 7, 2011, outside of Richgrove

== See also ==
- List of serial killers in the United States
