= Contract killing =

Form of murder

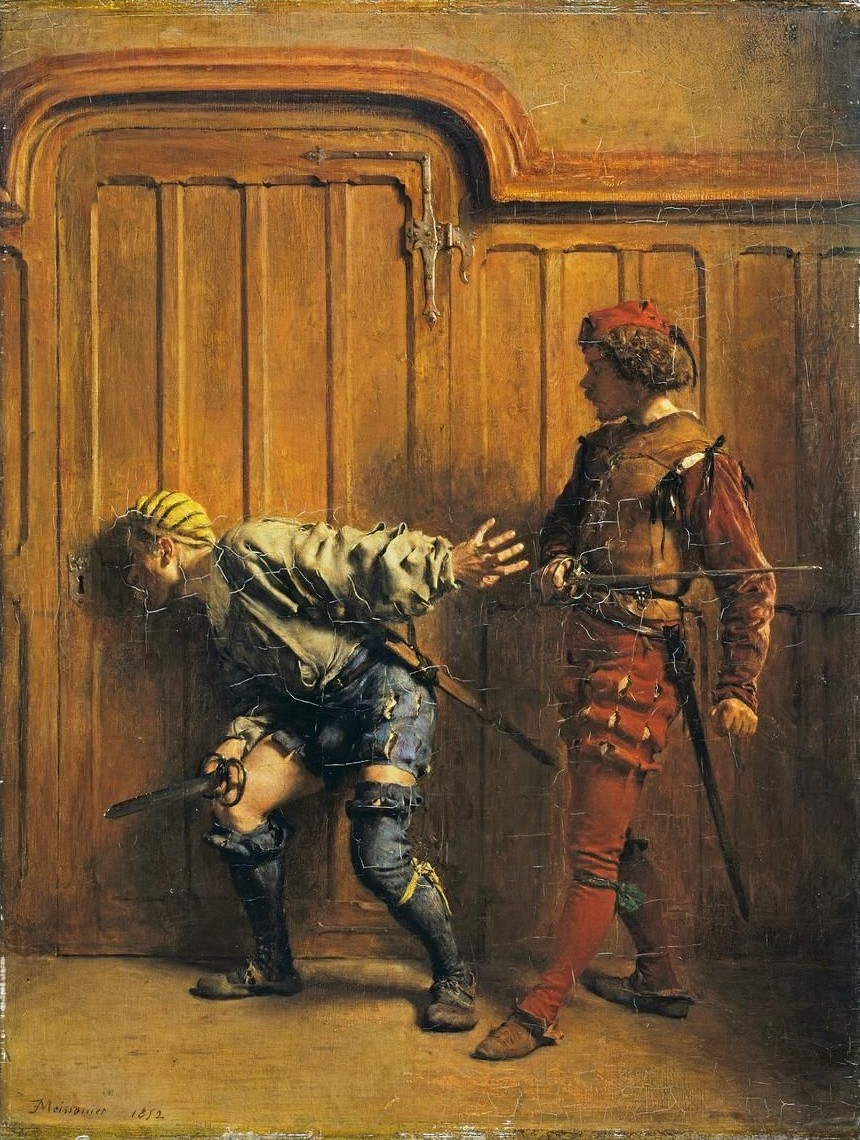
The Hired Assassins (Ernest Meissonier, 1852)

Contract killing, sometimes known as murder-for-hire, refers to the act in which one party employs another party to murder a targeted person via an illegal agreement that involves some form of compensation, monetary or otherwise. An act of contract killing is known colloquially as a hit, and the person performing the killing is known as the hitman. In the Spanish language "sicario" is used to refer to contract killers.

== Overview ==
The concept of "contract killing" was popularized by crime syndicates such as the American Mafia, who would use the term "contract" as a euphemism for an order to kill a rival.

Contract killings generally make up a small percentage of murders. For example, they accounted for about 6% of all murders in Scotland from 1993 to 2002. Despite the popular attention in the media, the act of contract killing received very little attention in the academic literature.

With contract killing, there is a party that sees contract killing as the only solution, searches for and recruits a hitman through personal networks or by approaching a professional, and then makes concrete agreements about method and payment.

A study by the Australian Institute of Criminology of 162 contract murders and attempted contract murders in Australia between 1989 and 2002 indicated that the most common reason for murder-for-hire was insurance policy payouts. The study also found that payments varied from $5,000 to $30,000 per killing, with an average of $15,000, and that the most commonly used weapons were firearms. Contract killings accounted for 2% of murders in Australia during that period.

To mitigate risk for the individual seeking a hitman, and signal legitimacy, vendors emphasize privacy and anonymity while claiming ties to established organizations like the military or mafia.

A paper by Calhoun (2010) argues that legal execution and killing in war are not morally different from paid killing. Calhoun thus states that the common distinction between legal and illegal killing has no real moral basis.

== See also ==
- Assassination market
- Cleaner (crime)
- List of contract killers and hitmen
- Mercenary
- Nothing Personal
- RentAHitman.com
- Wetwork
