= Melissa Calderon =

Criminal

- Born: Margarita Calderón Ojeda; August 12, 1984 (age 42); Mexico
- Other name: "La China"
- Occupations: Assassin, drug trafficker
- Status: Incarcerated
- Criminal charges: Murder, drug trafficking

Melissa Margarita Calderón Ojeda (born August 12, 1984), also known as "La China", is a suspected Mexican drug trafficker, assassin and the ex leader of "Las Fuerzas Especiales de Los Dámaso", an enforcer group of the Sinaloa Cartel under the orders of Damaso Lopez Nuñez. She left that organization after being replaced as leader, then started the Cartel California Sur with her then boyfriend El Chino Lopez and unknown members of Southern California gangs. Little else is known about her. She is allegedly responsible for over 150 murders in Mexico and multiple outbreaks of violence in La Paz.

== Biography ==
Calderón was born to José Alfredo Calderón Cota and Alma Guadalupe Ojeda Angulo. She began her criminal career with the Sinaloa Cartel in 2005.

Calderón was the leader of the Damaso Cartel, a sub-division of the Sinaloa Cartel, until she was forcibly removed of her rank by cartel leader "El Grande", who killed her first boyfriend, Erick Davalos Von Borstel. In response, she became the leader of "Las Fuerzas", along with her second boyfriend Hector Pedro Camarena Gomez ("El Chino"), and launched an internal war against "El Grande".

On September 20, 2015, police arrested Calderon at the Cabo San Lucas International Airport, where she attempted to board a flight to Culiacán. She is currently imprisoned in Federal Social Readaptation Center No. 1.
