= 3HunnaK =

Single by Lil JoJo
- Released: April 27, 2012; 13 years ago
- Genre: Drill
- Length: 1:49
- Producer: Smylez

"3HunnaK" is a 2012 song by Chicago rapper Joseph J. Coleman, released under the name Lil JoJo. The song is a response to "3Hunna" by Chief Keef, which taunted Coleman's gang the Gangster Disciples. The song gained attention for the repeated acronym "BDK" which stood for "Black Disciple Killer," referencing a rival gang.

== History ==
3HunnaK Chorus
19-second sample of the single 3HunnaK, first chorus part with the emphasizing of "BDK"

"3HunnaK" was written in response to the growing popularity of Chief Keef and Lil Durk during heightened tensions in a Chicago gang war between the Black Disciples and the Gangster Disciples. Coleman was a member of the latter. The song was in the drill music genre. The song and its video earned notice in the Chicago rap scene, and used some musical elements from Chief Keef's song "Everyday". "3HunnaK" was widely considered to be a diss track against the Black Disciples.

The song also referenced Coleman's faction of the Gangster Disciples, known as Bricksquad 069. Its music video showed Coleman and members of his clique with firearms. The music video and the surrounding controversy are believed to have contributed to Coleman's murder in September 2012. "3HunnaK" was referenced in the 2013 response track "Dis Ain't What U Want" by Lil Durk.
