= Murder of Lil JoJo =

American rapper (1994–2012)

Lil JoJo
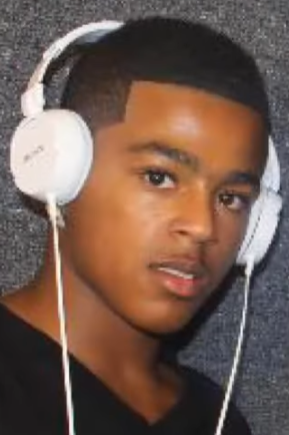
- Coleman in a recording studio as Lil JoJo
- Location: Chicago, Illinois, U.S.
- Date: September 4, 2012; 14 years ago
- Attack type: Murder
- Motive: Retaliation

Joseph J. Coleman (April 6, 1994 – September 4, 2012), who also performed as a rapper under the name Lil JoJo, was an American musician from Englewood, Chicago, Illinois whose murder at age 18 received wide coverage as a symptom of gang violence in Chicago.

Coleman gained notice in Chicago's early drill music scene and was affiliated with a street gang, the Gangster Disciples. He created diss tracks targeted at rival gangs that exacerbated already hostile intergang disputes. During a period of escalating feuding and heightened tensions among rival gangs, Coleman was killed in a drive-by shooting.

Coleman's death was highly publicized, and the circumstances surrounding his murder are remembered by Chicago residents as a landmark instance of the city's intensifying gang violence problem. To date, law enforcement has not made any arrests in connection to Coleman's murder and the case remains open.

== Early life ==
Coleman was born in Chicago, Illinois on April 6, 1994, to his mother Robin Wilson. His father's identity has not been disclosed publicly. Coleman was raised by his mother after his father was sentenced to 13 years in prison for attempted murder. He grew up at 69th and Parnell Avenue. His older paternal half-brother is rapper Swagg Dinero.

At some point, Coleman was initiated into the local Gangster Disciples gang. His membership has been confirmed by Chicago law enforcement.

== Rap career ==
During his teens, Coleman began rapping under the name Lil JoJo. His material was primarily of the drill music variety that at the time was gaining popularity in Chicago. According to his brother, Swagg Dinero, Coleman began rapping as a reaction to a song by Lil Durk that mocked and threatened the Gangster Disciples. Coleman gained notice in Chicago after self-releasing the song "3HunnaK" on April 27, 2012, a counter to the song "3Hunna" by Chief Keef. Coleman's song included the repeated acronym "BDK" ("Black Disciple Killer") and directly taunted Coleman's rival gangs. It gained notoriety in August of the same year when the Chicago police attributed this series of diss tracks the heightening intergang tensions.

During the feud, Coleman became the leader of a new sector of the Gangster Disciples known as Bricksquad or Bricksquad 069. Ensuingly, after Coleman's demise, 069 Bricksquad adopted the name "JoJoWorld" to honor him. In September 2012, extensive vitriol was exchanged via social media, particularly Twitter, between Coleman's camp and rival members of other sets. Among this exchange were insults from Coleman directed towards Chief Keef's camp.

== Death ==
Coleman was killed in a drive-by shooting in the Englewood neighborhood of Chicago on September 4, 2012. After a rival gang member was stalking him, Coleman revealed his location on Twitter, not long after posting the music video for his song "3HunnaK" to his YouTube account.

On the day of the shooting, Coleman and his clique traveled via car to Parkway Garden Homes, a low-income residential building complex located on the South Side of Chicago, also known as "O-Block". En route, Coleman and his companions recorded themselves taunting Chief Keef's clique in a contentious quarrel. Speaking from the car, Coleman and the other passengers traded derisive remarks with rapper Lil Reese and his companions who were outside and near his house at the time. The exchange concluded with Lil Reese retorting "Jo, I'ma kill you".

At 6:13 pm, Coleman shared on his Twitter account that he was on the 6900 block of South Princeton Avenue on the Chicago's South Side. Police reports state that at approximately 7:30pm, shots were fired at Coleman out of the driver's seat of a sedan at 70th and Princeton Ave. Video surveillance footage from a private residence captured the event. Coleman is seen on video riding on the pegs of a friend's bicycle. Upon the attack, he attempted to flee northbound on Princeton Avenue, but collapsed on the sidewalk. The other person on the bicycle is unidentified as is seen running in the opposite direction of the shooting. Coleman was transported to University of Chicago Medicine Comer Children's Hospital where he was pronounced dead at 9:03 pm. Six 9mm shell cartridges were found at the crime scene.

=== Investigations ===
No arrests were made for Coleman's murder. Subsequent investigations by the Chicago Police Department found no leads or viable persons of interest. Initially, the Chicago Police Department stated that there was a chance that Chief Keef, Lil Reese, or Lil Durk were involved. Police inspected Chief Keef's Twitter account but found no evidence warranting an arrest. Notably, a few hours after the incident, Chief Keef tweeted: "Hahahahahahaha… It's sad cuz ... JoJo wanted to be jus like us #LMAO," Further mentions of the murder by Chief Keef, especially during an online feud with Lupe Fiasco, furthered police suspicion that he was involved in the murder.

This tweet sparked controversy. However, Chief Keef later backpedaled this statement claiming that his Twitter account had been hacked. Coleman's mother expressed suspicions that Chief Keef's clique may have been involved in the shooting. In a 2012 BET TV interview during the show Don't Sleep hosted by T. J. Holmes, she purported that Chief Keef possibly hired a hitman to kill her son. She also expressed her disbelief in Chief Keef's claim that his Twitter account was hacked and that she feared she would've been killed herself. Chief Keef has firmly denied any involvement with the murder of Coleman and has continually reiterated his remorse to his family. When the incident gained widespread news coverage, Chief Keef tweeted: "Man, been thinkin bout this chicago street shit a lot.My prayers go out 2 Jojo's family on their loss. i didn't know him but he young jus like me. i can assure everyone that i had nothin 2 do with this tragedy tho. my twitter acct was hacked."

Rappers such as 50 Cent and Waka Flocka Flame made comments discouraging scapegoating Chief Keef for the murder. Waka Flocka Flame suggested that Chief Keef was being "vilified". Chicago police have hypothesized that Keith "Keke" Bonds was Coleman's murderer. Bonds was a 26-year-old member of the Black Disciples who was fatally shot on September 17, 2012. In 2013, Coleman's older brother claimed that Coleman's killer was dead, tweeting: "Even da opps know da mf who took my bro aint walkin dis earth nomore".

=== Funeral ===
Coleman's funeral was held at the Southwest Side funeral home. Police had to be summoned due to a group of teens disturbing the event. One of the teens reportedly yelled "get the fuck out.” A group of teens surrounded and almost toppled the casket with Coleman's body during the funeral procession, causing distress for the attendees. Gunfire rang outside of the funeral home, though it is unclear if the shots were fired to scare the funeral attendees or in remembrance of Coleman. After this incident, police were dispatched to the Morgan Park area and surrounding areas to quell additional unrest. Coleman was buried at Mount Hope Cemetery.

== Legacy ==
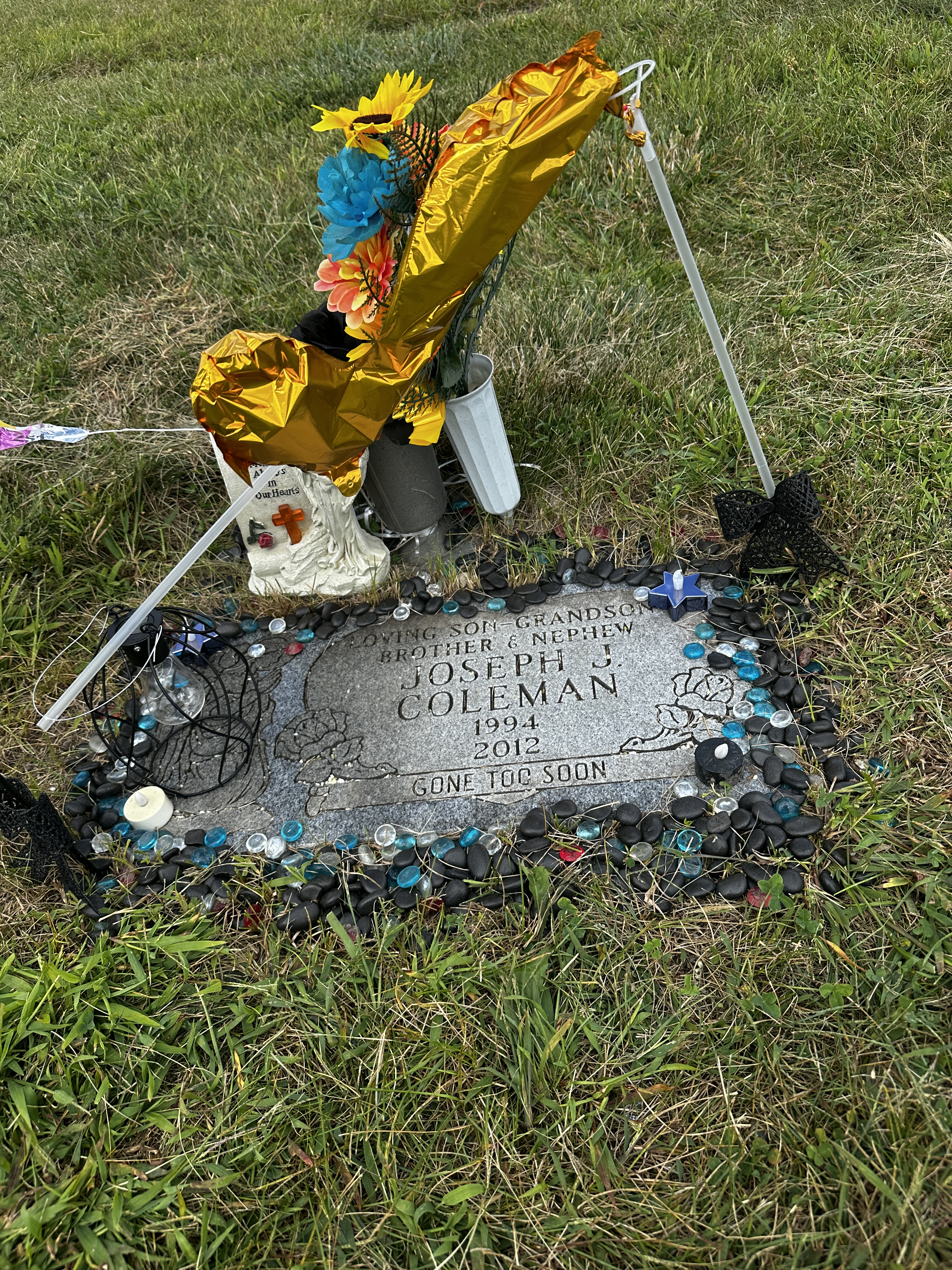
Coleman's grave pictured in September 2024

A few months after Coleman's murder, a teenager named Joshua "JayLoud" Davis was murdered for allegedly wearing a hoodie in commemoration of Coleman using his rapper name, Lil JoJo, in Black Disciple territory. The hoodie displayed the phrase JoJo World which is a commemoration of Coleman's death, as gangs often honor dead affiliates with the term "world." The murders of Coleman and Davis initiated widespread discussions of the escalation of the feud between the Black Disciples and the Gangster Disciples in Chicago.

After Coleman's death, there were debates on how the rap and drill scene affected the youth, not just in Chicago but nationally, with the music normally having violent and antagonizing lyrics. There were also debates on how social media heavily contributed to the situation with the current gang wars and feuds that were happening before, during, and after the death of Coleman.

In 2013, a documentary-style play titled Crime Scene: A Chicago Anthology featured actor Scott Baity Jr. as Coleman, to draw attention to crimes against the African-American population in Chicago. The play also displayed Coleman's tweets on a large screen behind the actors as his murder was reenacted. Coleman and several other slain Chicago rappers were honored in a 2024 concert hosted by Chicago's United Center.

== See also ==
- List of murdered hip hop musicians
