= Javi Chino =

Spanish footballer

Personal information
- Full name: Francisco Javier Hernández González
- Date of birth: 22 January 1987 (age 39)
- Place of birth: Badajoz, Spain
- Height: 1.84 m (6 ft 1/2 in)
- Position: Midfielder

Youth career
- Badajoz
- 2005–2006: Flecha Negra

Senior career*
| Years | Team | Apps | (Gls) |
| 2006–2007 | Numancia B | | |
| 2007 | Numancia | 1 | (0) |
| 2007–2008 | Linares | 5 | (0) |
| 2008–2009 | Badalona | 2 | (0) |
| 2009 | Atlético Ciudad | 7 | (0) |
| 2009–2010 | Celta B | 2 | (0) |
| 2010–2011 | Sporting Villanueva | 23 | (1) |
| 2011–2012 | Arroyo | 16 | (0) |
| 2012–2014 | Badajoz CF | 69 | (2) |
| 2014–2020 | Mérida | 133 | (2) |
| 2021–2023 | Montijo | 80 | (0) |
| 2023–2024 | Puebla de la Calzada | | |
- * Club domestic league appearances and goals

Francisco Javier Hernández González (born 22 January 1987), known as Javi Chino, is a Spanish former footballer who played as a midfielder.

== Club career ==
Born in Badajoz, Extremadura, Chino was a CP Flecha Negra youth graduate. In 2006, he joined CD Numancia, making his senior debut with the reserves in the Tercera División.

On 25 March 2007 Chino played his first match as a professional, coming on as a second half substitute for Sietes in a 0–3 away loss against UD Almería in the Segunda División. He left the club in June, and signed for Segunda División B side CD Linares on 9 July.

Chino continued to appear in the lower leagues in the following campaigns, representing CF Badalona, CF Atlético Ciudad, Celta de Vigo B, Sporting Villanueva Promesas, Arroyo CP, Badajoz CF and Mérida AD.
