= LaSheena Weekly =

American anti-gun violence activist

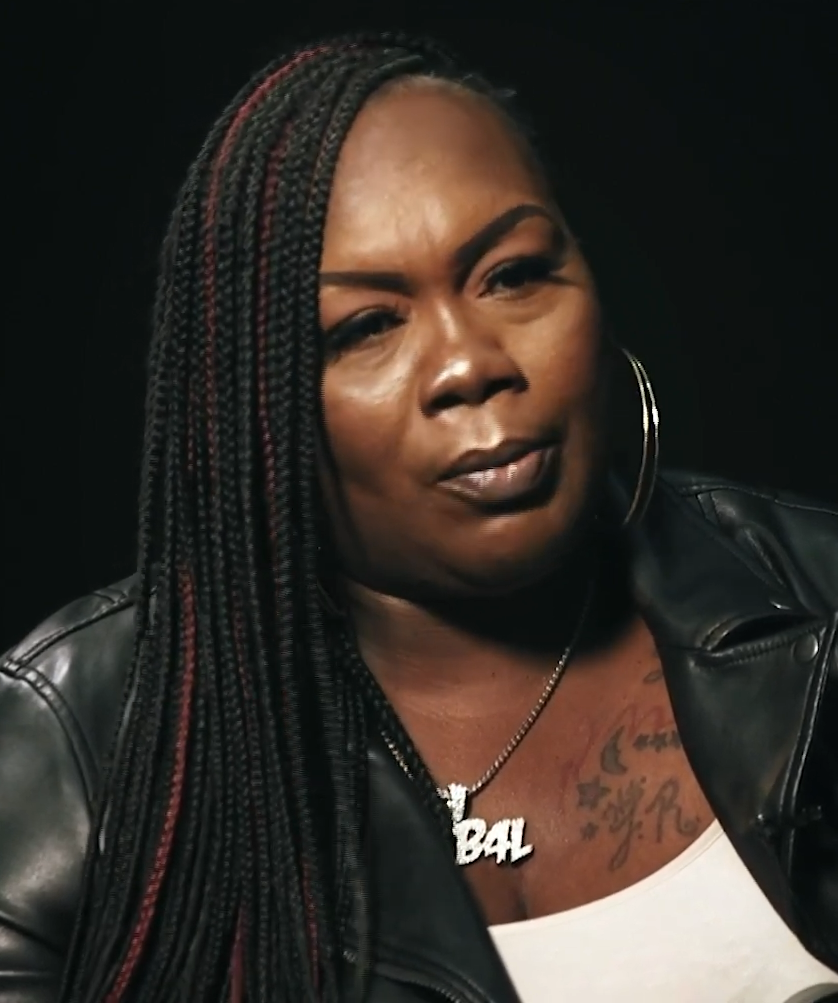
- Weekly in 2022
- Born: Chicago, Illinois, U.S.
- Other name: Momma Duck
- Occupation: Activist
- Known for: Anti-gun violence advocacy
- Children: 9, including FBG Duck and FBG Brick

LaSheena Weekly is an American anti-gun violence activist from Chicago. She became a public figure and advocate following the separate shooting deaths of her two sons, rappers Jermaine "FBG Brick" Robinson and Carlton "FBG Duck" Weekly. In the wake of their killings, Weekly became a prominent voice for peace in Chicago and has organized community initiatives. In 2024, she filed a high-profile wrongful death lawsuit against rapper Lil Durk, his record label, and the estate of King Von, alleging their involvement in her son FBG Duck's murder.

== Early life and family deaths ==
Weekly was raised in Chicago, Illinois, living for a time in the Ida B. Wells Homes public housing project on the city's South Side.

=== 2014 house fire ===
On March 12, 2014, a fire broke out in Weekly's Rogers Park apartment, resulting in the death of her 3-year-old daughter, LeAndrea White. (Note: Some sources spell the child's first name Le-Andrea.) Investigators believed the fire may have been accidentally started by the child playing with a lighter. Weekly, who had eight children at the time, was present and attempted to extinguish the flames before escaping with other family members.

=== Killing of Jermaine "FBG Brick" Robinson ===
Jermaine Robinson (professionally known as FBG Brick, aged 26) and Stanley Jacoby Mack (known as Coby Mack, aged 31) were shot and killed on July 17, 2017, in the Woodlawn neighborhood on Chicago's South Side. The double homicide remains unsolved. At approximately 2:50 p.m. on July 17, 2017, Chicago Police responded to shots fired in the 6300 block of South St. Lawrence Avenue. Robinson was found with a fatal head wound; Mack lay mortally wounded in an adjacent gangway. Neighbors reported hearing a dozen rounds from two different-caliber firearms. The Chicago Police Department has made no arrests and announced no suspects. As of 2025, the double homicide remains open and unsolved.

=== Murder of Carlton "FBG Duck" Weekly ===
On August 4, 2020, Weekly's younger son, 26-year old, Carlton Weekly, known professionally as FBG Duck, was murdered in a brazen daylight shooting in Chicago's affluent Gold Coast neighborhood. The attack was carried out by members of the rival O Block gang. In 2024, six men were convicted of his murder in a major federal RICO case.

Weekly publicly criticized emergency responders for the delayed medical aid provided to her son at the scene, an issue later investigated by news outlets.

== Activism and public advocacy ==
Following both her sons' deaths, LaSheena Weekly became an anti–gun violence advocate, publicly calling for peace and an end to retaliatory shootings in Chicago. LaSheena Weekly recalled the aftermath of her eldest son Jermaine Robinson's murder on July 17, 2017. She described collapsing upon seeing his body, and how her younger son, Carlton Weekly (FBG Duck), knelt beside her as she pleaded with him not to retaliate. Weekly stated, "I said in his ear, 'Don't do anything stupid, I need you with me.'" Days after Duck's death, she held a press conference pleading for an end to retaliatory violence in the city. She is a member of "Warrior Moms", a group with other mothers whose children have died due to violence. In August 2021, she helped organize an event that sent over 50 youths to Six Flags Great America to provide them with a temporary escape from the city's violence. Weekly has frequently used social media and interviews to speak about her grief, criticize the glorification of violence in drill music, and respond to other artists, including Lil Durk, who have referenced her son's death in their music.

== Wrongful death lawsuit ==
On October 9, 2024, Weekly, as the administrator of her son Carlton's estate, filed a wrongful death lawsuit in Cook County Circuit Court. The lawsuit names rappers Durk "Lil Durk" Banks, his record label Only the Family (OTF), and the estate of the late Dayvon "King Von" Bennett as defendants, among others. The suit alleges that the defendants were involved in a "criminal enterprise" that profited from gang-related violence and that they "conspired, planned, and financed the murder-for-hire" of FBG Duck. The complaint specifically claims a bounty was placed on her son's head, leading to his assassination. The lawsuit seeks damages for wrongful death, civil conspiracy, and intentional infliction of emotional distress.

== Personal life ==
In 2021, Weekly was involved in a serious car accident in a vehicle her son FBG Duck had gifted her.

In September 2026, record executive, Cash "Wack 100" Jones, was featured on streamer, DJ Akademiks' live stream, where Jones made disrespectful claims regarding the death of FBG Duck. To resolve the drama, Akademiks got Weekly on the phone, where Wack 100 claimed that Weekly was responsible for her son's death, which started a screaming match between the two.

== See also ==
- Crime in Chicago
