= The Triibe =

Online newspaper based in Chicago Illinois USA

- Type: online newspaper
- Owner(s): Morgan Elise Johnson, Tiffany Walden
- Editor: Tiffany Walden
- Founded: 2017; 8 years ago
- City: Chicago, Illinois
- Country: United States
- Website: thetriibe.com

The TRiiBE is an African-American online news and digital media company based in Chicago, Illinois. It was founded in 2017 by Morgan Elise Johnson and Tiffany Walden, along with web developer David Elutilo. In 2019, they published a print version of their TRiiBE Guide, an annual guide to Black Chicago.

The site is a digital media platform that combines original reporting with "documentary, creative writing and photography" to cover the stories of the Black community in Chicago. They have collaborated with Chicago Reader on a multimedia series called Block Beat, which features Chicago artists and the neighborhoods they cite as influences. They have also created Another Life, a documentary series in which Johnson and Walden follow people managing the aftermath of lives lost to gun violence.

== History ==
Walden and Johnson were friends and sorority sisters who attended Northwestern University and wanted to create media that reflected the Chicago they were familiar with, and which didn't just view Black neighborhoods as sources of crime and poverty. They originally created the publication for Black millennials, but later expanded their mission to include Black Chicagoans of all ages. In 2018, Walden, was selected as one of Poynter's 2018 class for the Poynter-NABJ Leadership Academy for Diversity in Digital Media. Morgan Johnson made the Forbes 30 Under 30 media list in 2019. In March 2021, both Walden and Johnson were featured on the cover of Chicago Magazine's “The New Power 30” issue.
