= Anna Maria of Anhalt =

- Anna Maria Anhalcka
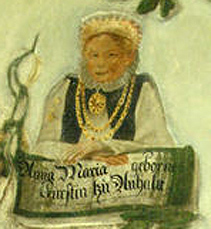
- Born: 13 June 1561; Zerbst, Principality of Anhalt-Zerbst
- Died: 14 November 1605 (aged 44); Brzeg

Anna Maria of Anhalt (Polish: Anna Maria Anhalcka; Zerbst, 13 June 1561 – Brzeg, 14 November 1605), was by birth a member of the House of Ascania and a princess of Anhalt. After her marriage, she was Duchess of Legnica-Brzeg-Oława-Wołów.

Anna Maria was the eldest daughter of Joachim Ernest, Prince of Anhalt, by his first wife Agnes, daughter of Wolfgang I, Count of Barby-Mühlingen.

== Life ==
In 1570, the nine-year-old Anna Maria succeeded her paternal aunt Elisabeth as Abbess of Gernrode and Frose. This dignity was only titular, however; the territory had in reality been incorporated into the principality of Anhalt, with her father as "administrator" and holder of Gernrode's vote in the Reichstag.

In 1577, Anna Maria was relieved from her post as abbess in order to marry Joachim Frederick, eldest son and heir of George II the Pious, Duke of Brzeg. The wedding took place in Brzeg on 19 May of that year. Her successor as abbess was her younger sister Sibylla.

Duke George II died in 1586 and was succeeded by his sons, but only in Oława and Wołów, because Brzeg was given to his wife Barbara of Brandenburg as her dower. Anna Maria and her husband settled in Oława. Only three years later, in 1589, Anna Maria gave birth the first of the six children she produced during her marriage.

After the death of his brother John George in 1592, Joachim Frederick became sole ruler of Oława-Wołów. After John George's widow relinquished her dower lands in 1594 and Barbara of Brandenburg died in 1595, Joachim Frederick was finally able to re-unite the entire duchy. In his will, completed on 16 December 1595, he gave the district of Oława to his wife as her dower.

Joachim Frederick died on 25 March 1602. Anna Maria assumed the regency on behalf of their two surviving sons, John Christian and George Rudolf, who were minors at that time. In addition to her position as regent, she was the reigning Duchess of Oława.

Anna Maria died only three years after her husband. Because her sons were still underage, she was succeeded in the regency by her sister-in-law Elisabeth Magdalena of Brieg and her husband Charles II of Poděbrady, Duke of Ziębice-Oleśnica, until 1609, when John Christian attained his majority and assumed the government by himself.

Anna Maria of Anhalt House of Ascania Born: 13 June 1561 Died: 14 November 1605
Preceded by Joachim Frederick	Duchess of Oława; 1602–1605	Succeeded by John Christian
