= Anna of Württemberg =

- Duchess of Legnica
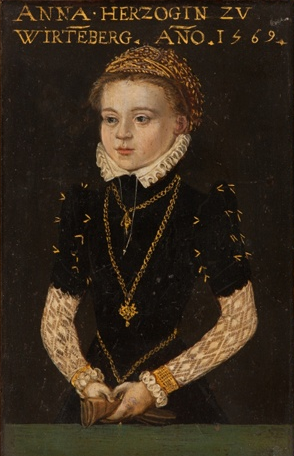
- Anna of Württemberg in 1569

Duchess of Oława
- Reign: 1592–1594
- Predecessor: John George of Ohlau
- Successor: Joachim Frederick of Brieg
- Born: 12 June 1561; Stuttgart
- Died: 7 July 1616 (aged 55); Chojnów
- Spouse: John George of Ohlau; Frederick IV of Liegnitz
- Issue: George Christoph; Barbara
- House: Württemberg
- Father: Christoph, Duke of Württemberg
- Mother: Anna Maria of Brandenburg-Ansbach

Anna of Württemberg (12 June 1561 in Stuttgart – 7 July 1616 in Chojnów) was a German princess, member of the House of Württemberg, and by her two marriages duchess of Oława-Wołów and Legnica.

Anna was the daughter of Christoph, Duke of Württemberg, and Anna Maria of Brandenburg-Ansbach, daughter of George, Margrave of Brandenburg-Ansbach.

== Life ==
In Brzeg on 16 September 1582, Anna married John George, second son of George II the Pious, Duke of Brzeg. The couple had two children, a son George Christoph and a daughter Barbara, but both died shortly after the birth.

Duke George II died on 7 May 1586 and his two sons inherited only Oława-Wołów as co-rulers, because he left Brzeg to his widow Barbara as her dower. Anna and her husband settled their residence in Oława. John George died there six years later, on 6 July 1592.

In her husband's will, Anna received the Duchy of Oława as her dower, with full sovereignty until her own death. However, two years later, on 24 October 1594, Anna married the twice widower Duke Frederick IV of Legnica. According to the terms of the dower grant, the beneficiary lost her lands if she remarried or became a nun (resignation was not considered). In consequence, Anna was stripped of the government over Oława, which was retaken by Joachim Frederick, the brother of her first husband.

Duke Frederick IV died on 27 March 1596, after only seventeen months of childless marriage. Anna, widow for second time, retired to Chojnów, where she died twenty years later.

Anna of Württemberg House of Württemberg Born: 12 June 1561 Died: 7 July 1616
Preceded by John George	Duchess of Oława; 1592–1594	Succeeded by Joachim Frederick
