= John Christian of Brieg =

Duke of Brzeg–Legnica–Wołów

John Christian
- Duke of Brzeg–Legnica–Wołów
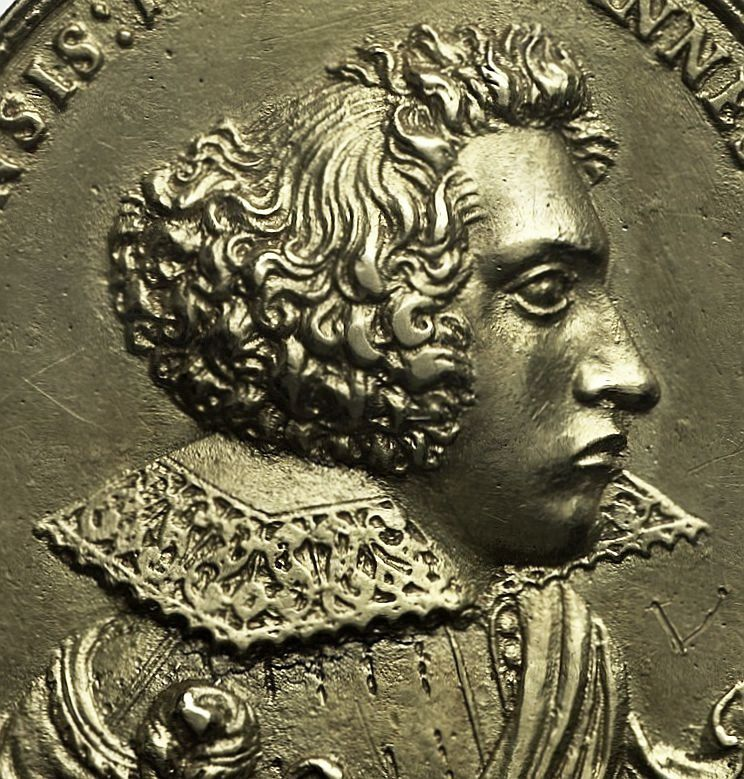
- John Christian of Brieg
- Born: 28 August 1591; Oława, Silesia
- Died: 25 December 1639 (aged 48); Ostróda
- Buried: Church of St. Hedwig in Brzeg
- Noble family: Silesian Piasts
- Spouses: Dorothea Sybille of Brandenburg; Anna Hedwig of Sitzsch
- Issue: George III of Brieg; Louis IV of Legnica; Christian, Duke of Brieg; Count August of Legnica
- Father: Joachim Frederick of Brieg
- Mother: Anna Maria of Anhalt

John Christian of Brieg (Polish: Jan Chrystian; German: Johann Christian; Ohlau, 28 August 1591 – Osterode in Ostpreußen (today Ostróda), 25 December 1639) was a Duke of Brzeg–Legnica–Wołów (since 1602; with his brother as co-ruler in Legnica and Wołów until 1612; in Oława since 1605).

He was the second but eldest surviving son of Joachim Frederick, Duke of Brzeg–Oława–Legnica–Wołów, by his wife Anna Maria, daughter of Joachim Ernest, Prince of Anhalt. In his baptism, which was two weeks after his birth, on 14 September, he received the names of both uncles: John George of Oława and Christian of Anhalt.

== Life ==
=== Youth ===
Joachim Frederick died on 25 March 1602, leaving his two sons as the heirs of his domains. John Christian was eleven-years old and his younger brother George Rudolf was only seven, the regency of the Duchies was taken by their mother, the Dowager Duchess Anna Maria (who held Oława as her dower). After Anna Maria's death in 1605, the regency was taken by the paternal aunt of the young Dukes (and only surviving sibling of the late Joachim Frederick), Elisabeth Magdalena of Brieg and her husband, Charles II of Poděbrady, Duke of Ziębice–Oleśnica.

During some time, John Christian live in Krosno Odrzańskie (German: Crossen an der Oder), where he met his first wife, Dorothea Sybille of Brandenburg.

=== Beginning of Rule ===
In 1609 John Christian attained his majority and assumed the government. On 7 October of that year he paid homage to the Emperor Rudolf II in Wrocław. In 1612 his younger brother George Rudolf was formally declared an adult. Then, the brothers decided to make the division of their lands: John Christian retained Brzeg, Oława, Strzelin, Niemcza, Kluczbork and Byczyna, and George Rudolf came into possession of Legnica, Wołów, Złotoryja, Grodźca, Lubin, Prochowice, Wińsko, Wąsosz, Ryczeń and Rudna.

=== Conversion to Calvinism ===
In 1613 John Christian, then a Lutheran, began to profess openly the Calvinism. With him, his younger brother George Rudolf also changed his religion. The brothers followed the example their second-cousin, John Sigismund, Elector of Brandenburg, who shortly before publicly took communion according to the Calvinist rite, after almost two years of professed in secret. Thanks to this, they could renewed the alliance of the Duchy of Legnica-Brzeg with the House of Hohenzollern.

=== Thirty Years' War ===
In 1617 Ferdinand II of Habsburg was elected King of Bohemia. The new ruler, raised by the Jesuits, began immediately the Counter Reformation. The Protestants were totally against his election to the Bohemian throne, especially when it became clear that Ferdinand II had no intention to give them the tolerance guaranteed by Imperial Decree of the late Emperor Rudolf II. The conflict between the Bohemians and Ferdinand II deepened when the new King showed his aspirations for the Absolutism rule. In the civil war started between the Bohemians and the Habsburgs, John Christian stood on the Bohemian side. With the insistence of John George of Brandenburg, Duke of Krnov, his brother George Rudolf and his cousins, the Dukes of Oleśnica, Henry Wenceslaus and Karl Frederick of Poděbrady (later his son-in-law) and as General Prefect (Governor) of Silesia (a function held from him since 1617 onwards) he formed an army who, under the leadership of John George of Krnov went to Bohemia to help the insurgents. In 1619 the states of Bohemia announced the dethronement of Ferdinand II, and on 26 July was elected as new King of Bohemia Frederick V, Elector Palatine, a strong Calvinism.

John Christian was a strong supporter of the new King. After the election of Frederick V, he stood at the forefront of the national government of Silesia. On 27 February 1620 in Wrocław the Silesian states paid tribute to Frederick V, during which the formula of the oath was given by the Duke of Brzeg. John Christian also worked in the diplomatic affairs on behalf of King-Elector. In Poland, he sought to raise more troops to support the civil war against the Habsburgs. Also, he made contacts with the Anti-Habsburg opposition in Hungary, where the King counted with the support of Gábor Bethlen, Prince of Transylvania. In Silesia John Christian persuaded several nobles to join to the Anti-Habsburg side, promising military support. However, the cruelty and dictatorial government of Frederick V, the Silesians began to reject the Anti-Habsburg moods and they fading totally on 8 November 1620, when at the Battle of White Mountain were the Habsburg army severely defeated the Bohemian forces. One day after, Prague was occupied by the Habsburgs. Standing all the time faithfully at the side of Frederick V, John Christian urged to the Silesian states to adopt a tax on the continuation of the war. However, the following successful of Ferdinand II between the Princes who support the Elector crashed all his plans; on 23 December John Christian was finally defeated and fled to the court of George William, Elector of Brandenburg. The Silesian government entered immediately in negotiations with the winners. On 28 February 1621 in Dresden, with the mediation of Elector John George I of Saxony, the agreement was signed. The Silesian states sworn fidelity to the Emperor and break completely all relations with his enemies. In addition, Ferdinand II received the sum of 300,000 guilders for participants in the revolt, with the exception of the chief of the Silesian forced, Duke John George of Krnov.

Feared for his life, John Christian went in April 1621 to Frankfurt, in the limits of Brandenburg and granted to him by George William of Brandenburg (who was the nephew of his wife, Dorothea Sybille), where since the end of February the Duke of Brzeg and his family lived. In the meanwhile, the Emperor Ferdinand II give the government of Brzeg to John Christian's brother, George Rudolf. After the subsequent mediation of the Elector of Saxony, on 8 December John Christian could return safely to his Duchy.

In the subsequent years, John Christian wasn't involved in the political game. Nevertheless, he was forced to go into exile again. In 1630 King Gustavus Adolphus of Sweden began his interference in the Thirty Years' War. At his insistence, the Elector John George I of Saxony, until then a faithful follower of the Hasbsburgs, passed to the revolt side. In 1632 the Saxon army entered in the Silesian states, including the Duchy of Brzeg. In the next year, at the Northwestern, came the Imperial army under the command of Hans Ulrich von Schaffgotsch, husband of John Christian's sister, Barbara Agnes. His troops entered in Oława and even took Strzelin, but soon they had to withdraw. Nevertheless, the Imperial Army began to gain advantage and already in the autumn of 1633, Silesia was free from the Anti-Habsburg armies. John Christian was accused of allowing the access of the Saxon armies to Brzeg; the Imperial troops invaded his Duchy, and the Duke, his family and court were forced to fled. First, he moved to Wołów, and shortly after he moved to Wąsosz, where, feared of the troops of Schaffgotsch, and together with his brother, George Rudolf, on 12 October 1633 he managed to come to Poland, stopping in Leszno.

=== Exile in Poland ===
On 20 October 1633 John Christian arrived to Toruń, where he rented a house, after obtaining the prior consent of the King Wladyslaw IV Vasa to move to Poland.

In 1634 John Christian came to Silesia to talk with some Protestant subjects in the duchies and cities. He had the idea to convince the Silesian states to accept the authority of the King of Poland and repudied the overlordship of Ferdinand II; however, this idea was never realized.

John Christian never return to his Duchy of Brzeg. In 1635 Ferdinand II entrusted the government of Brzeg to John Christian's oldest son George III as administrator. In January 1635 John Christian returned to Toruń. On 4 October 1636, and after obtaining the consent of George William of Brandenburg, John Christian assumed the direct administration over Ostróda, where he remained with his family until his death.

=== Death ===
John Christian died of pneumonia on 25 December 1639 in Ostróda, six months after his second (morganatic) wife, Anna Hedwig of Sitzsch. Four months later, on 19 April 1640, his body was sent to Brzeg, where he arrived on 1 May. However, the formal funeral took place only less than a year after his death, on 12 December 1640. His body was deposited in the Church of St. Hedwig in Brzeg, alongside his first wife, Dorothea Sybille.

== Marriages and Issue ==
In Berlin on 12 December 1610 John Christian married firstly with Dorothea Sybille (b. 29 October 1590 - d. 19 March 1625), daughter of John George, Elector of Brandenburg by his third wife, Elisabeth of Anhalt-Zerbst. As a dowry, John Christian received 30,000 talers. On 30 December, the newlyweds came to Legnica, where they lived for a year. On 6 December 1611 the couple moved to Brzeg, where Dorothea Sybille remained until her death, thirteen years later. On 14 May 1625 her body was placed in the Church of St. Hedwig in Brzeg. They had thirteen children:

1. George III (b. Brzeg, 4 September 1611 - d. Brzeg, 4 July 1664).
2. Joachim (b. 20 December 1612 - d. 9 February 1613).
3. Henry (b. 3 February 1614 - d. 4 February 1614).
4. Ernest (b. 3 February 1614 - d. 4 February 1614), twin of Henry.
5. Anna Elisabeth (b. 23 March 1615 - d. 28 March 1616)
6. Louis IV (b. Brzeg, 19 April 1616 - d. Legnica, 24 November 1663).
7. Rudolf (b. 6 April 1617 - d. 8 February 1633).
8. Christian (b. Oława, 9 April 1618 - d. Oława, 28 February 1672).
9. August (b. 18 March 1619 - 12 March 1620).
10. Sibylle Margareta (b. Brzeg, 20 June 1620 - d. Gdańsk, 26 June 1657), married on 23 October 1637 to Count Gerhard VII of Dönhoff.
11. Dorothea (b. 16 August 1622 - d. 26 August 1622).
12. Agnes (b. 16 August 1622 - d. 3 September 1622), twin of Dorothea.
13. Sophia Magdalena (b. Brzeg, 14 June 1624 - d. Oława, 28 April 1660), married on 2 December 1642 to Charles Frederick I, Duke of Münsterberg-Oels, Duke of Ziębice–Oleśnica.

In Brzeg on 13 September 1626 John Christian married secondly with Anna Hedwig (b. 13 January 1611 - d. Ostróda, 16 July 1639), daughter of the Marshal Frederick of Sitzsch. The young bride (she had fifteen years) was a relative of John VI of Sitzsch, who during 1600–1608 held the dignity of Bishop of Wrocław and Imperial Governor of Silesia. However, the union was morganatic under the standards of the House of Piast, and for this the marriage was temporary a secret. A successfully arrangement on 24 June 1626 secured financially the eventual offspring of the union, but they were excluded from the succession of the Duchy of Legnica-Brzeg. Eighteen months later, on 7 December 1627, Emperor Ferdinand II gave an Imperial Diploma raised Anna Hedwig to the rank of Baroness (German: Freiherrin), and two months later, on 18 February 1628, by a similar act in Regensburg the Emperor issued for the oldest son of John Christian and Anna Hedwig, August, the title of Baron of Legnica (German: Freiherr von Liegnitz), and the same title was secured for the future children of the couple. Anna Hedwig died in Ostróda six months before her husband, aged twenty-eight. She was buried there on 5 October. They had seven children:

1. Baron August of Legnica (b. Brzeg, 21 August 1627 - d. Siebenhufen, 14 May 1679), created Count in 1664.
2. Baroness Dorothea Sybille of Legnica (b. 17 July 1628 - d. 18 June 1629).
3. A son (b. and d. 30 June 1629).
4. Baron Ernest of Legnica (b. 27 November 1630 - d. 16 March 1631).
5. Baron Sigismund of Legnica (b. Brzeg, 31 January 1632 - d. 14 July 1664), married on 1 October 1659 to Baroness Eva Eleonore of Bibran-Modlau (b. December 1644 - d. 6 July 1671). The union was childless.
6. Baroness Johanna Elisabeth of Legnica (b. Toruń, 8 June 1634 - d. Swiatnik, 30 October 1673), married on 3 November 1651 to Baron Zdenko Howora Berka von Dub und Leipa.
7. Baroness Anna Christina of Legnica (b. Ostróda, 18 October 1636 - d. Brzeg, 5 September 1642).

John Christian of Brieg House of Piast Born: 28 August 1591 Died: 25 December 1639
Preceded by Joachim Frederick	Duke of Legnica; 1602–1612 with George Rudolf	Succeeded by George Rudolf
Preceded by Joachim Frederick	Duke of Wołów; 1602–1612 with George Rudolf	Succeeded by George Rudolf
Preceded by Joachim Frederick	Duke of Brzeg; 1602–1633 with George Rudolf (1602-1612)	Succeeded by George III; Louis IV; Christian
Preceded by Anna Maria	Duke of Oława; 1605–1633	Succeeded by George III; Louis IV; Christian
