= Henry Wenceslaus, Duke of Oels-Bernstadt =

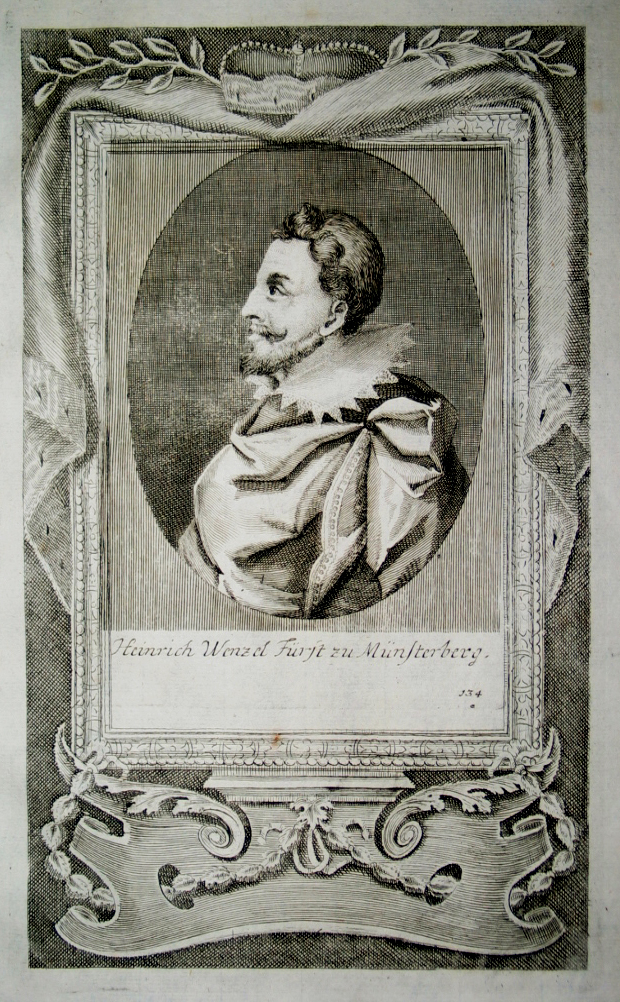
- Henri Venceslas of Œls-Bernstadt
- Born: 7 October 1592 probably Oleśnica
- Died: 21 August 1639 (aged 46) probably Bernstadt
- Buried: Oleśnica
- Noble family: House of Poděbrady
- Spouses: Countess Palatine Anna Magdalena of Veldenz; Anna Ursula of Reibnitz
- Father: Charles II
- Mother: Elisabeth Magdalena of Brieg

Henry Wenceslaus, Duke of Oels-Bernstadt (also known as: Henry Wenceslaus of Poděbrady, Henry Wenceslaus of Bernstadt or Henry Wenceslaus of Münsterberg, German: Heinrich Wenzel von Oels und Bernstadt, Heinrich Wenzel von Podiebrad, or Heinrich Wenzel von Münsterberg, Czech: Hynek Václav z Minstrberka or Jindřich Václav Minsterberský; 7 October 1592, probably in Oleśnica – 21 August 1639, probably in Bernstadt) was Duke of Bernstadt from 1617 until his death. He also used the titles of Duke of Münsterberg and Count of Glatz, although he never ruled those territories. From 1629 to 1639 he was Governor of Silesia.

== Life ==
Henry Wenceslaus was a member of the Münsterberg branch of the noble House of Poděbrady. His parents were Duke Charles II of Münsterberg-Oels and his wife, Princess Elisabeth Magdalena of Brieg (1562–1630), daughter of the Duke George II of Brieg.

Henry Wenceslaus was appointed in 1608 as rector of the Viadrina European University in Frankfurt (Oder). Following a Grand Tour through Europe, he was Commissioner for the imperial army of Silesia and Imperial Council. After his father's death in 1617, he took up government of the Duchy of Bernstadt. At the same time he and his younger brother Charles Frederick inherited the Moravian dominions of Šternberk and Jevišovice.

Together with his brother Charles Frederick, Henry Wenceslaus welcomed in February 1620 in his North Moravian town of Šternberk, King Frederick V of Bohemia, who had been newly elected in 1619 and was on his way to Breslau to receive homage. Henry Wenceslaus invited the composer and hymn writer Matthäus Apelt to Bernstadt in 1625 and appointed him in 1631 as secretary of his chancellery.

In 1627, Henry Wenceslaus attended the coronation in Prague of the later Emperor Ferdinand III as King of Bohemia. After Duke Georg Rudolf resigned in 1628 as Landeshauptmann of Silesia, an imperial decree reduced the political influence of future office holders. In 1629, King Ferdinand III appointed Henry Wenceslaus to the office, after the latter had promised to respect the freedom of religion. When in 1632, the Protestant princes of Silesia approached to Swedish and Saxon invaders, Henry Wenceslaus, who remained loyal to the emperor, refused to convene the Estates and temporarily left the country. Henry Wenceslaus never lost not the imperial favor, unlike his brother Charles Frederick, who in 1633, together with Duke John Christian of Brieg and George Rudolf of Liegnitz and the City Council of Breslau joined a defensive league, which sought the protection of Saxony, Brandenburg and Sweden.

In 1637, Henry Wenceslaus awarded town privileges to the town of Międzybórz.

He died in 1639 and was buried in Oleśnica. His brother Charles Frederick succeeded him as Duke of Bernstadt.

== Marriages and Issue ==
- On 7 November 1617 he married Anna Magdalena of Pfalz, Countess Palatine of Veldenz (b. 1602 – d. 1630), daughter of George Gustavus, Count Palatine of Veldenz. This marriage remained childless.
- On 26 August 1636 he married secondly and morganatically Anna Ursula von Reibnitz (b. ca. 1616 – d. 1 January 1657), eldest daughter of Albrecht von Reibnitz (1580-1628) and his wife, Katharina von Neefe (b. 1577). On 16 January 1637 in Regensburg, Anna Ursula was raised to the rank of Duchess of Bernstadt by King of the Romans Ferdinand III. They had three children:
  - Anna Elisabeth of Münsterberg (b. 6 July 1637 – 28 January 1642).
  - A son (born and died on 25 May 1638).
  - A son (posthumous, born and died 7 November 1639).
