= August of Legnica =

Polish nobleman

August
- Count of Legnica
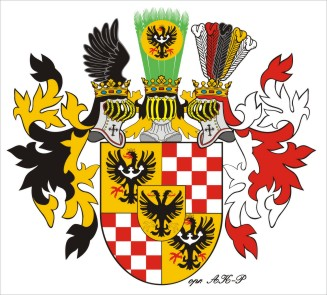
- Coat of arms of the Barons and later Counts of Legnica.
- Born: 21 August 1627; Brzeg
- Died: 14 May 1679 (aged 51); Siebenhufen near Przeworno
- Noble family: Silesian Piasts
- Spouses: Elisabeth Raupowsky von Raupow; Elisabeth Charlotte of Nassau-Dillenburg
- Issue: Christian August; Anna Louise Elisabeth; Johanna Elisabeth
- Father: John Christian of Brieg
- Mother: Anna Hedwig of Sitzsch

Count August of Legnica (Polish: August hrabia legnicki; German: Graf August von Liegnitz; Brzeg, 21 August 1627 – Siebenhufen near Przeworno, 14 May 1679), was the last male-line member of the House of Piast.

He was the ninth (fourth surviving) son of John Christian, Duke of Brzeg-Legnica-Wołów-Oława, but the first-born by his second wife Anna Hedwig of Sitzsch.

== Life ==
The marriage of Duke John Christian and Anna Hedwig was considered morganatic and in consequence all the eventual children born of them were excluded from the succession of the Duchy of Legnica-Brzeg. The status of Anna Hedwig changed considerably when she was raised to the rank of Baroness by Emperor Ferdinand II on 7 December 1627. Shortly after, on 18 February 1628, August was also raised to the Baronial rank with the title of Baron of Legnica (German: Freiherr von Liegnitz), a title who was secured for the future children of the couple. From August's six full-siblings, only two survive infancy: Baron Sigismund and Baroness Johanna Elisabeth of Legnica, by marriage Baroness Berka von Dub und Leipa. None of them left descendants.

After the outbreak of the Thirty Years' War, the young August and his family fled to Poland, first to Toruń and later to Ostróda, where his parents died in 1639.

August was raised to the Comital rank with the title of Count of Legnica (German: Graf von Liegnitz) by Bohemian royal order at Regensburg on 12 January 1664.

In 1675 his nephew George William, the last Piast Duke of Legnica-Brzeg, died without issue. Then August made his claim over the Duchies, as the last living male representative of the family (his younger brother Sigismund had died in 1664). The key of his eventual success was to demonstrated that the Agreement of 24 June 1626 who deprived Anna Hedwig of Sitzsch's descendants from the right of succession over Legnica-Brzeg was valid only if the descendants of Duke John Christian's first marriage were alive.

August's claims were ultimately rejected, and in compensation, the Emperor Leopold I granted to him a high annual pension. From all the Legnica-Brzeg lands, August could retain only two districts: Przeworno and Kantorowice near Brzeg.

August, the last male member of the Piast dynasty, died on 14 May 1679 in his castle of Siedminie (Siebenhufen) and 28 September of that year he was buried in the Church of the Holy Trinity in Przeworno.

== Marriages and issue ==
On 8 October 1653, August married firstly with Elisabeth (d. 24 April 1660), daughter of Johann Adam Raupowsky von Raupow, Baron of Ruppau, and widow of Karl Deodat, Baron of Zahradek. They had three children:

- Count Christian August of Legnica (b. 30 April 1655 - d. 26 May 1671).
- Countess Anna Louise Elisabeth of Legnica (b. 18 January 1658 - d. 2 November 1659).
- Countess Johanna Elisabeth of Legnica (b. and d. 5 April 1660).

On 2 August 1665, August married secondly with Elisabeth Charlotte (b. Dillenburg, 2 June 1643 - d. Györ (Raab), Hungary, 2 March 1686), daughter of George Louis, Hereditary Prince of Nassau-Dillenburg. This union was childless.
