= Joachim Frederick of Brieg =

Joachim Frederick
- Duke of Oława, Wołów, Brzeg, Legnica
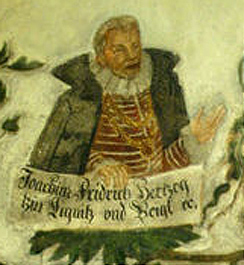
- Born: 29 September 1550
- Died: 25 March 1602 (aged 51); Brzeg
- Noble family: Silesian Piasts
- Spouse: Anna Maria of Anhalt
- Issue: John Christian of Brieg; Barbara Agnes; George Rudolf; Maria Sophia
- Father: George II the Pious
- Mother: Barbara of Brandenburg

Joachim Frederick of (Legnica-)Brieg (German: Joachim Friedrich von Liegnitz-Brieg; Polish: Joachim Fryderyk legnicko-brzeski; 29 September 1550 – Brzeg, 25 March 1602), was a Duke of Oława and Wołów (since 1586 with his brother as a co-ruler until 1592) and Brzeg (since 1595) and Legnica (since 1596).

He was the eldest son of George II the Pious, Duke of Brzeg-Oława-Wołów, by his wife Barbara, daughter of Joachim II Hector, Elector of Brandenburg. He was named after both grandfathers: Joachim II Hector and Frederick II of Legnica.

== Life ==
=== Youth ===
During his father's reign, Joachim Frederick wasn't included in the government of the Duchy of Brzeg. He spent seven years at the court of his maternal uncle, John George, since 1571 Elector of Brandenburg. As a representative of Brandenburg, Joachim Frederick appeared at the coronation of Henry of France as King of Poland in 1574, and in the coronation of King Rudolf II in Rome on 27 October 1575. Two years later, he received a dowry of 15,000 talers secured for the town of Wąsosz on occasion of his marriage with Anna Maria of Anhalt.

=== Duke of Oława-Wołów ===
George II died on 7 May 1586. Joachim Frederick, together with his younger brother John George took the government of Oława (where they settled his residence) and Wołów but not in Brzeg, who was given by the late Duke to his widow Barbara of Brandenburg as dower. When John George died on 6 July 1592 without surviving issue, Joachim Frederick became in the sole ruler of all their domains, except the two main cities of Brzeg (dower of his mother Barbara) and Oława (dower of his sister-in-law Anna of Württemberg, widow of John George). However, two events changed this situation: on 24 October 1594 Anna remarried with Duke Frederick IV of Legnica (and in consequence lost her dower lands), followed two months later by the death of Barbara, on 2 January 1595. Joachim Frederick reunited all the paternal heritage under his rule.

His Duchy also expanded thanks of the districts of Dzierżoniów and Srebrna Góra, who had rich deposits of precious metals. Also, in 1596 he inherited Legnica after the death of Duke Frederick IV without surviving issue.

=== Government and functions ===
Joachim Frederick was an efficient ruler. He ratified the former privileges of his cities and supported the development of crafts. In Oława he built fortifications and opened mints, thanks to the mines of Dzierżoniów and Srebrna Góra. Also, he established a pension for the unmarried daughters of the deposed Henry XI of Legnica.

Thanks to his family connections and his good relations with the Prague court, he held honorable functions. Since 1585 he held the dignity of Lutheran Provost of the Chapter of Magdeburg, and in 1588 was appointed the General Commander of the Regular Army of Silesia.

=== Death ===
Joachim Frederick died on 25 March 1602 in Brzeg. On 7 May, he was buried in the local church of St. Hedwig. Under his will, wrote on 16 December 1595, he gave the district of Oława to his wife as dower.

He was succeeded by his two surviving sons, John Christian and George Rudolf. Since both are minors at that time, the regency was exercised, firstly by their mother Anna Maria, and after her death in 1605, by their uncle Charles II of Poděbrady, Duke of Ziębice-Oleśnica.

== Marriage and issue ==
In Brzeg on 19 May 1577, Joachim Frederick married with Anna Maria (b. Zerbst, 13 June 1561 – d. Brzeg, 14 November 1605), daughter of Joachim Ernest, Prince of Anhalt. They had six children:

1. George Ernest (b. Oława, 29 August 1589 – d. Oława, 6 November 1589).
2. John Christian (b. Oława, 28 August 1591 – d. Ostróda, 25 December 1639).
3. Barbara Agnes (b. Oława, 24 February 1593 – d. 24 July 1631), married on 18 October 1620 to Hans Ulrich von Schaffgotsch und zu Kynast und Greiffenstein, Baron of Trachenberg and Warmbrunn.
4. George Rudolf (b. Oława, 12 January 1595 – d. Wroclaw, 14 January 1653).
5. Anna Maria (b. Brzeg, 16 December 1596 – d. Brzeg, 25 March 1602).
6. Maria Sophia (b. Brzeg, 26 April 1601 – d. Prochowice, 26 October 1654).

Joachim Frederick of Brieg House of Piast Born: 29 September 1550 Died: 25 March 1602
Preceded by George II the Pious	Duke of Oława with John George; 1586–1592	Succeeded by Anna
Preceded by George II the Pious	Duke of Wołów with John George (until 1592); 1586–1602	Succeeded by John Christian and George Rudolf
Preceded by Barbara	Duke of Brzeg; 1595–1602	Succeeded by John Christian and George Rudolf
Preceded by Frederick IV	Duke of Legnica; 1596–1602	Succeeded by John Christian and George Rudolf
Preceded by Anna	Duke of Oława; 1594–1602	Succeeded by Anna Maria
