= Barbara of Brandenburg =

Barbara of Brandenburg may refer to:

- Barbara of Brandenburg, Marquise of Mantua (1422–1481)
- Barbara of Brandenburg (1464–1515), Queen of Bohemia
- Barbara of Brandenburg-Ansbach-Kulmbach (1495–1552)
- Barbara of Brandenburg, Duchess of Brieg (1527–1595)
