= Wołów bank robbery =

1962 Bank robbery in Poland

On Sunday 19 August 1962 a group of six men, with help of a bank’s safe-keeper, robbed a local branch of the National Bank of Poland, located in the town of Wołów in Lower Silesian Voivodeship (southwestern Poland). Altogether, 12,531,000 złotys were stolen, which in late 2000s (decade) prices, would make some 18 million złotys. It was the biggest bank robbery in the history of the People's Republic of Poland, to the point that the Polish government for a while considered withdrawing all 50-złoty and 100-złoty bills from the market, which would help find the robbers.

== The robbery ==
The robbery was described with details in a local newspaper Głos Pracy, which dedicated large part of its 19 October 1962 issue to the "job". According to the article, which was written two months after the robbery, on Sunday 19 August 1962 a group of robbers approached a guard who was entering the bank to work the night shift. The guard was bound, and left in the cellar, while the robbers entered the main hall, quickly finding the safe.

The robbers got into the safe through a hole cut in the wall by a jack-screw. They stole 12,531,000, all in 500-, and 100-złoty notes. The loot was staggering for these times, as back then, the biggest lottery jackpots were up to 1 million złotys.

According to Colonel Stanisław Gorniecki of the local police department, the guard spent the whole night in the cellar, and was found on the next day at 4:30 a.m., by a cleaning lady, who upon entering the building noticed that the main door had not been locked. The woman then heard moaning coming from the cellar, and she went down to spot the guard. Soon afterwards the police were informed, and all local roads were closed, and the officers checked all trunks. Criminals and thieves known to the police were investigated, and on the same day (Monday 20 August) a group of police experts came by plane from Warsaw. The investigation was dubbed W-62.

== The investigation ==
The experts found out that the robbers had used a Warszawa car, also, due to several traces left on the ground, they managed to tell the type of tires. Also, the vehicle hit a pile of broken bricks, so search immediately started. Furthermore, on the ripped safe there were traces of paint of the tools used. It looked like all tools were painted in the same color, so the detectives tried to locate a shop or a workshop to which the tools belonged. As the robbery was very quick, it was suggested that one of the criminals was a person associated with the bank, who knew the details of the inside. Therefore, all employees were investigated. Finally, it was established that all stolen banknotes belonged to the AP and AR series (for 500 złoty notes), and DI, DK and DR series (100 złoty notes). All bank tellers and cashiers in the country were informed about it.

== The arrests ==
Hundreds of tip-offs came to the police from uninvolved individuals around the country, and the first significant information came from Pruszcz Gdański, where a woman came to a bank to deposit 18,000 złotys. Among the money, there were a lot of bills from the marked series, and the teller immediately informed the police. A short investigation concluded that the woman was related to a person from Wołów, who was a customer of the bank, and turned out to be one of the robbers.

The second tip came from Ostrów Wielkopolski, where a bank teller noticed that a 500-złoty note was very damaged and probably fake. The manager of the bank checked it - the note was real, but it was purposely tattered to look old and worn. Altogether, there were nine such notes in the Ostrów Wielkopolski bank. All were taken to the laboratory, which confirmed that the money was new, and probably washed in a laundry machine.

One day later, on 1 October 1962, a woman entered a textile store in the Kluczbork. She picked an expensive carpet, and handed the seller a 500-złoty bill. The female employee immediately realized that it was the wanted note, but at the same time the customer sensed she was in trouble. She wanted the money back, but also suggested a bribe. The seller would not hear of it, locked the store and called the police. The customer was the wife of a man from Wołów, who turned out to be one of the brains of the gang. A search of their house resulted in finding a great deal of stolen money that belonged to the marked series. It was a breakthrough moment of the investigation, and in the next three days, all the robbers were caught.

== The robbers ==
The police were shocked to learn that none of the robbers were seasoned criminals, but a group of otherwise law-abiding citizens of the town. Their brains was an electrician Stanisław J., who had worked for the bank, and who had ordered his comrades to stay quiet for a while, and avoid any big purchases, not to bring heat on the gang. All were sentenced to 25 years, but left prison after 17 years, in 1979. The police recovered almost all the money stolen in the heist.

In 1975, film director Mieczysław Waskowski made a movie Hazardzisci (The Gamblers), which is dedicated to the 1962 robbery.

Also, in 2008, Polish Radio Wrocław created a radio show, telling the story of the robbery, and Polish TV Wroclaw, together with Gazeta Wyborcza filmed a documentary titled Napad na bank.

== See also ==
- List of bank robbers and robberies
