= Anna Maria of Brandenburg-Ansbach =

Princess (1526–1589)

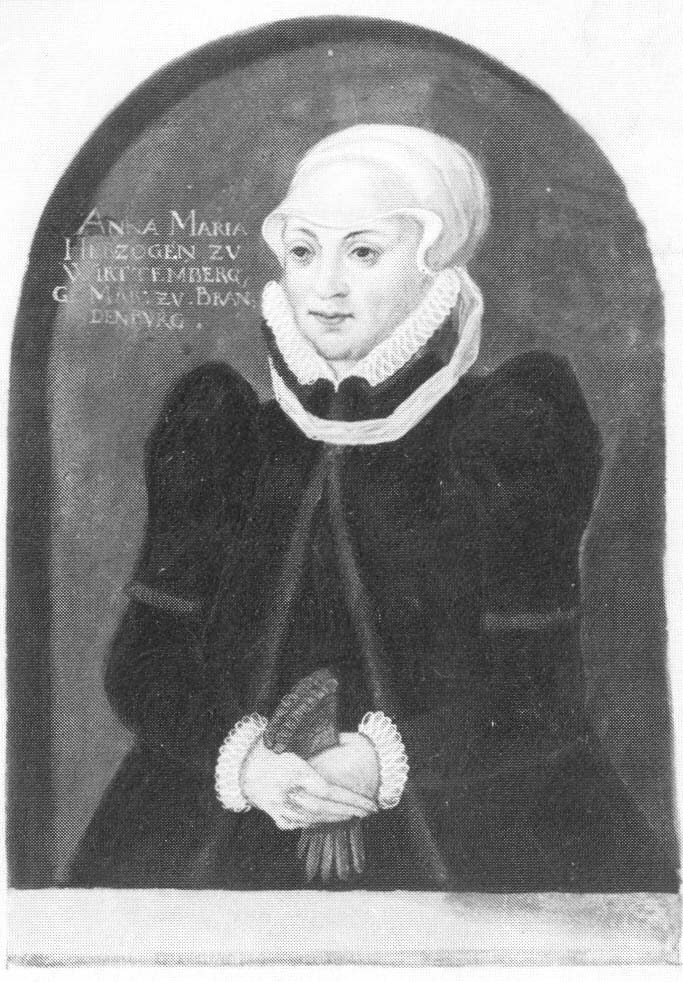
- Anna Maria of Brandenburg-Ansbach
- Born: 28 December 1526; Jägerndorf
- Died: 20 May 1589 (aged 62); Nürtingen
- Burial: St. George's Collegiate Church, Tübingen
- Spouse: Christoph, Duke of Württemberg (m. 1544; died 1568)
- Issue: Eberhard, Hereditary Duke of Wüttemberg; Hedwig, Landgravine of Hesse-Marburg; Elisabeth, Countess Palatine of Veldenz-Lauterecken; Sabine, Landgravine of Hesse-kassel; Emilie, Countess Palatine of Simmern-Sponheim; Eleonore, Landgravine of Hesse-Darmstadt; Louis III, Duke of Württemberg; Maximilian; Ulrich; Dorothea Maria, Countess Palatine of Sulzbach; Anna, Duchess of Legnica; Sophie, Duchess of Saxe-Weimar
- House: House of Hohenzollern
- Father: George, Margrave of Brandenburg-Ansbach
- Mother: Hedwig of Münsterberg-Oels

Anna Maria of Brandenburg-Ansbach (28 December 1526 – 20 May 1589) was a princess of Brandenburg-Ansbach in the Holy Roman Empire.

== Early life ==
Anna Maria was born at Jägerndorf, the eldest daughter of George, Margrave of Brandenburg-Ansbach and Hedwig of Münsterberg-Oels, daughter of Charles I of Münsterberg-Oels.

== Biography ==
Anna Maria was brought up as a Lutheran and on 24 February 1544 became the wife of Christoph, Duke of Württemberg. She and Christoph had a son, Louis. Anna Marie later acted as guardian to her son Louis III, Duke of Württemberg early in his reign. After the death of her husband Christoph she lived more than 20 years in the Nürtingen castle, she died in Nürtingen.

After losing both her husband and her eldest son in 1568, Anna Maria fell madly in love with the young Landgrave George I of Hesse-Darmstadt (1547–1596), who was half her age and later became her son-in-law. Soon afterwards she became mentally confused and was locked up. George I later married her daughter Eleonore.

She died in 1589 and was buried in the St. George's Collegiate Church in Tübingen.

== Sources ==
- Hohkamp, Michaela (2007). "Sisters, Aunts, and Cousins: Familial Architectures and the Political Field in Early Modern Europe". In Sabean, David Warren; Mathieu, Jon; Teuscher, Simon (eds.). Kinship in Europe: Approaches to Long-Term Development (1300-1900). Berghahn Books. ISBN 9780857456861.
