= Duchess Hedwig of Württemberg =

German Duchess

Hedwig of Württemberg
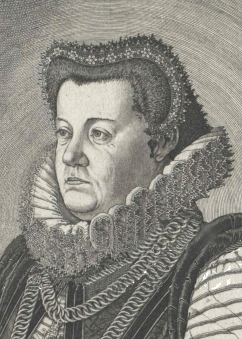
- Born: 15 January 1547; Basel
- Died: 4 March 1590 (aged 43); Marburg
- Noble family: House of Württemberg
- Spouse: Louis IV, Landgrave of Hesse-Marburg (m. 1563)
- Father: Christopher, Duke of Württemberg
- Mother: Anna Maria of Brandenburg-Ansbach

Duchess Hedwig of Württemberg (15 January 1547, Basel – 4 March 1590, Marburg) was a princess of Württemberg by birth, and by marriage Landgravine of Hesse-Marburg.

== Life ==
Hedwig was the eldest daughter of Duke Christopher of Württemberg from his marriage to Anna Maria, daughter of the Margrave George of Brandenburg-Ansbach-Kulmbach.

She married on 10 May 1563 in Stuttgart Landgrave Louis IV of Hesse-Marburg. As a strict Lutheran, she was a major influence on her husband. As a result, he remained with the Duke of Württemberg in close religious association, but he also came into confrontation with his brother William, who wanted to unite all Protestant forces in Germany.

Hedwig died on 4 March 1590 and was buried next to her husband under in a tomb, with her statue in the St. Mary's Church in Marburg.

== References and sources ==
- Wilhelm Münscher: Versuch einer Geschichte der hessischen reformirten Kirche p. 34
