= George Rudolf of Liegnitz =

George Rudolf
- Duke of Legnica, Wołów
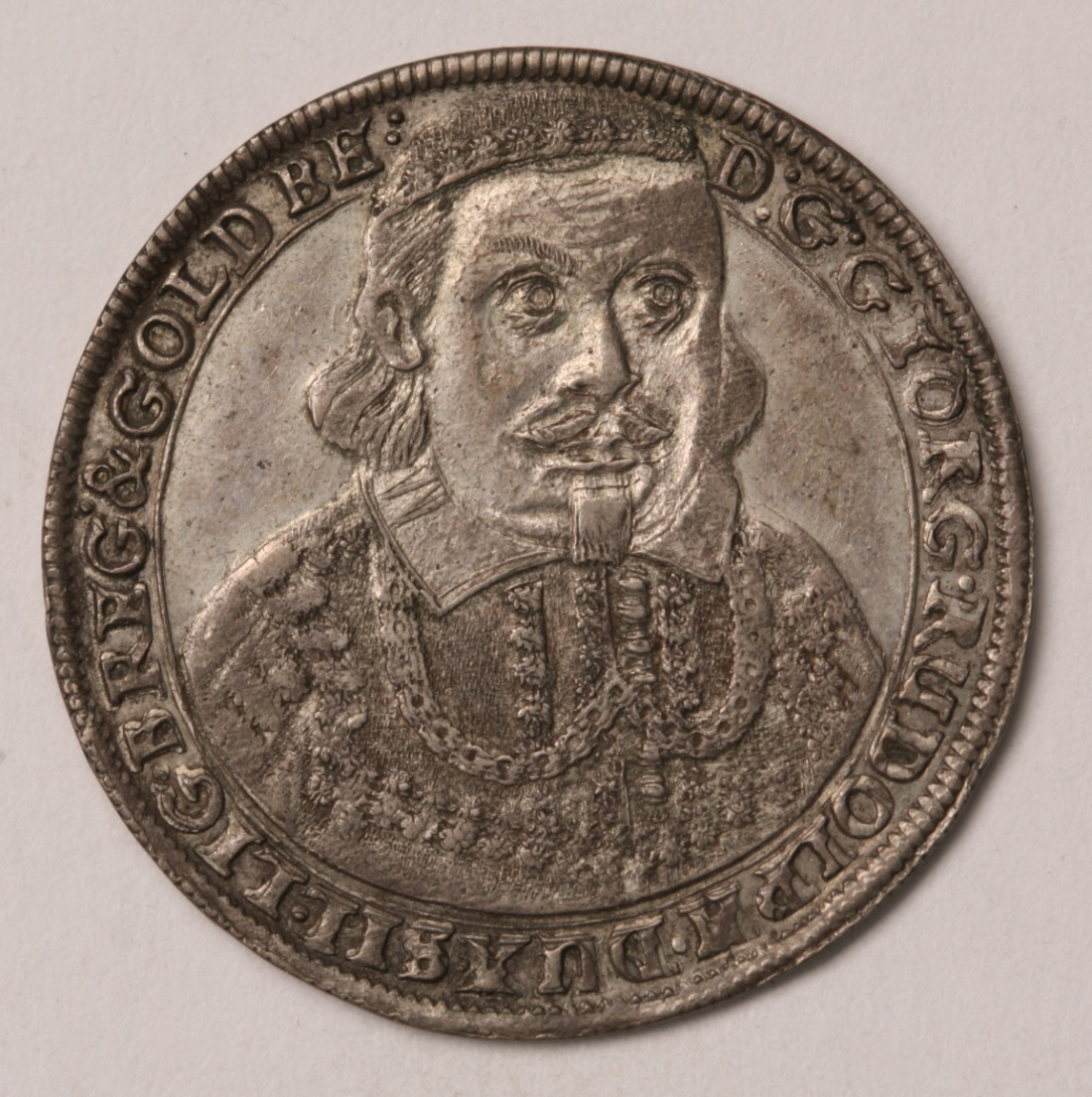
- George Rudolf of Liegnitz Funerary Medal, 1653.
- Born: 22 January 1595
- Died: 14 January 1653 (aged 57)
- Noble family: Silesian Piasts
- Spouses: Sophie Elisabeth of Anhalt-Dessau; Elisabeth Magdalena of Münsterberg-Oels
- Father: Joachim Frederick of Brieg
- Mother: Anna Maria of Anhalt

George Rudolf of Liegnitz (German: Georg Rudolf von Liegnitz; Polish: Jerzy Rudolf Legnicki) (22 January 1595 – 14 January 1653) was duke of Liegnitz-Wohlau (present-day Legnica-Wołów) from 1602 to 1653. A humanist, patron of arts, composer and poet, he was also Upper Governor of Silesia during 1621-1628 and from 1641 onwards.

== Life ==
George Rudolf was born in Ohlau, the third but second surviving son of Joachim Frederick of Brieg, Duke of Liegnitz-Brieg (Legnica-Brzeg) and Anna Maria of Anhalt, daughter of Joachim Ernest, Prince of Anhalt. At the death of their father in 1602, George Rudolf and his older brother John Christian were minors, and their mother, the Dowager Duchess Anna Maria, became regent. After her death in 1605, the regency was taken by the paternal aunt of the young Dukes (the only surviving sibling of the late Joachim Frederick), Elisabeth Magdalena of Brieg and her husband, Karl II of Poděbrady, Duke of Münsterberg-Oels (Ziębice-Oleśnica). In 1609 John Christian became an adult and handled the government and George Rudolf's guardianship. When in 1612 George Rudolf became of age, the brothers divided their domains, Georg Rudolf ruling over "Liegnitz" (present-day Legnica, Wołów, Złotoryja, Grodźca, Lubin, Prochowice, Wińsko, Wąsosz, Ryczeń and Rudna and from 1616 on Chojnów) and John Christian over "Brieg" (present-day Brzeg, Oława, Strzelin, Niemcza, Kluczbork and Byczyna).

Following the example of his brother, George Rudolf converted to Calvinism in 1614. During the Thirty Years' War, he was exiled for fifteen years (1633–1648) as a result of the occupation of his land by the Habsburg Imperial army, though he nominally retained the government.

George Rudolf, as a ruler, was thoroughly educated and supported the development of culture and science. In particular, he is known as the creator of the famous Biblioteca Rudolphina. In his court were reunited prominent scholars, poets and composers such as Martin Opitz and Friedrich von Logau, who often found asylum and protection at his court. He also promoted musical education; the Duke trained in composing competitions during a stay in Frankfurt, and collected prints and manuscripts of music works. During this time, he met one of the most prominent composers of his era, Heinrich Schütz, who dedicated to George Rudolf his collection of religious songs Cantiones sacrae. Some surviving compositions by George Rudolf were recorded by Ars Nova on the CD "Rudolphina - Legnica Treasures" under direction of the Polish musician Jacek Urbaniak.

In Dessau on 4 November 1614, George Rudolf married his first cousin Sophie Elisabeth (10 February 1589 – 9 February 1622), daughter of his maternal uncle John George I, Prince of Anhalt-Dessau. His second marriage (on 25 November 1624) was to another first cousin: Elisabeth Magdalena (29 May 1599 – 4 November 1631), daughter of aforementioned Duke Karl II and George Rudolf's paternal aunt Elisabeth Magdalena of Brieg. Both marriages were childless. Twice widowed, George Rudolf remained single for the next twenty-two years, until his death at Breslau. His lands were inherited by his nephews George III, Louis IV and Christian, the three only surviving sons of the first (and only equal) marriage of his brother John Christian, who had died in 1639.

== Sources and references ==
- von Isenburg, Prince W.K. & Schwennicke D.; Europäische Stammtafeln (Vol III, Part I, Table 11), Marburg (1984)
- Marek, Miroslav. "Complete Genealogy of the House of Piast: Silesia". Genealogy.EU.
- Chronological Dates in Stoyan
- Kultura polska: RUDOLPHINA. SKARBY LEGNICY

Preceded by Joachim Frederick	Duke of Brieg with John Christian; 1602–1612	Succeeded by John Christian
Preceded by Joachim Frederick	Duke of Liegnitz with John Christian (until 1612); 1602–1653	Succeeded by George III; Louis IV; Christian
