= Christoph, Duke of Württemberg =

German noble (1515–1568)

Christoph
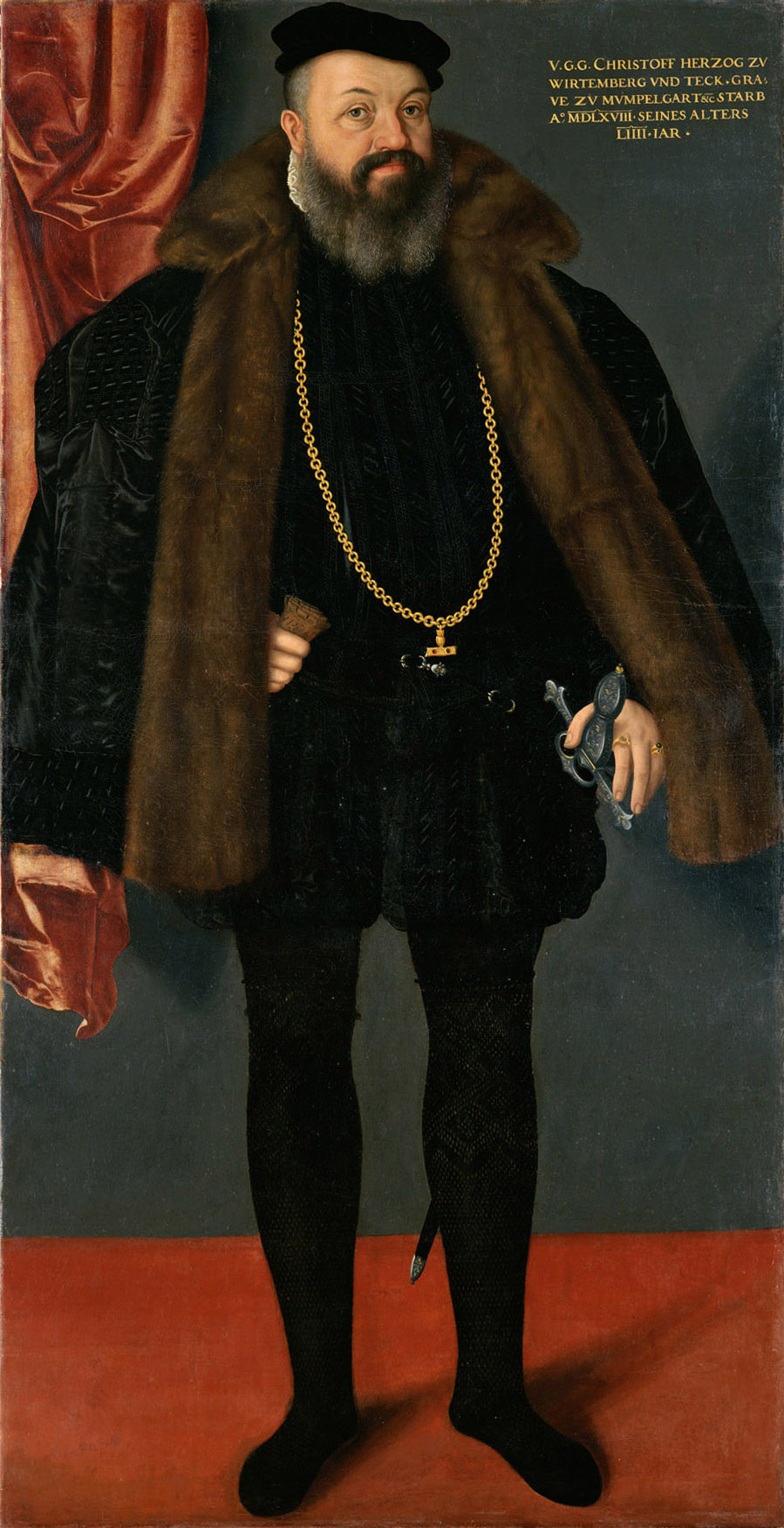
- Portrait, c. 1560s

Duke of Württemberg
- Reign: 6 November 1550 – 28 December 1568
- Predecessor: Ulrich
- Successor: Louis III
- Born: 12 May 1515; Bad Urach
- Died: 28 December 1568 (aged 53); Stuttgart
- Spouse: Anna Maria of Brandenburg-Ansbach (m. 1544)
- Issue among others…: Eberhard, Hereditary Duke of Wüttemberg; Hedwig, Landgravine of Hesse-Marburg; Elisabeth, Countess Palatine of Veldenz-Lauterecken; Sabine, Landgravine of Hesse-Kassel; Emilie, Countess Palatine of Simmern-Sponheim; Eleonore, Landgravine of Hesse-Darmstadt; Louis III, Duke of Württemberg; Maximilian; Ulrich; Dorothea Maria, Countess Palatine of Sulzbach; Anna, Duchess of Legnica; Sophie, Duchess of Saxe-Weimar
- House: Württemberg
- Father: Ulrich, Duke of Württemberg
- Mother: Sabina of Bavaria
- Religion: Lutheran (after 1535); Roman Catholic (until 1535)

Christoph of Württemberg (12 May 1515 – 28 December 1568), ruled as Duke of Württemberg from 1550 until his death in 1568.

== Life ==
Born in 1515, Christoph was the son of Ulrich, Duke of Württemberg and Sabina of Bavaria. In November 1515, only months after his birth, his mother fled to the court of her parents in Munich. Young Christoph stayed in Stuttgart with his elder sister Anna and his father, Duke Ulrich. When the Swabian League mobilized troops against Ulrich, he brought them to Castle Hohentübingen. In 1519 Württemberg came under Austrian rule after the castle surrendered and Duke Ulrich was banished.

Christoph was sent to the court of Holy Roman Emperor Maximilian I in Innsbruck where he grew up and was able to gain political experience under Habsburg tutelage. Maximilian's successor Charles V took him on his travels through Europe.

Meanwhile, his father Ulrich had regained Württemberg from the Austrians in 1534 and Christoph was sent to the French court, where he became embroiled in France's wars against the Habsburgs. At the end of the 1530s, Christoph converted to Protestantism. In 1542, the Treaty of Reichenweier installed him as the governor of the Württemberg region of Montbéliard.

On succeeding his father in 1550, Christoph was forced to make high payments to avoid charges of treason by Holy Roman Emperor Ferdinand I. In subsequent years, he re-organized the entire administration of the church and state. He also reformed and supported the educational system. Christoph gave Amandenhof castle near Urach to Hans von Ungnad who used it as the seat of the South Slavic Bible Institute.

== Marriage and issue ==
In 1544, Christoph married Anna Maria, daughter of George, Margrave of Brandenburg-Ansbach. They had:

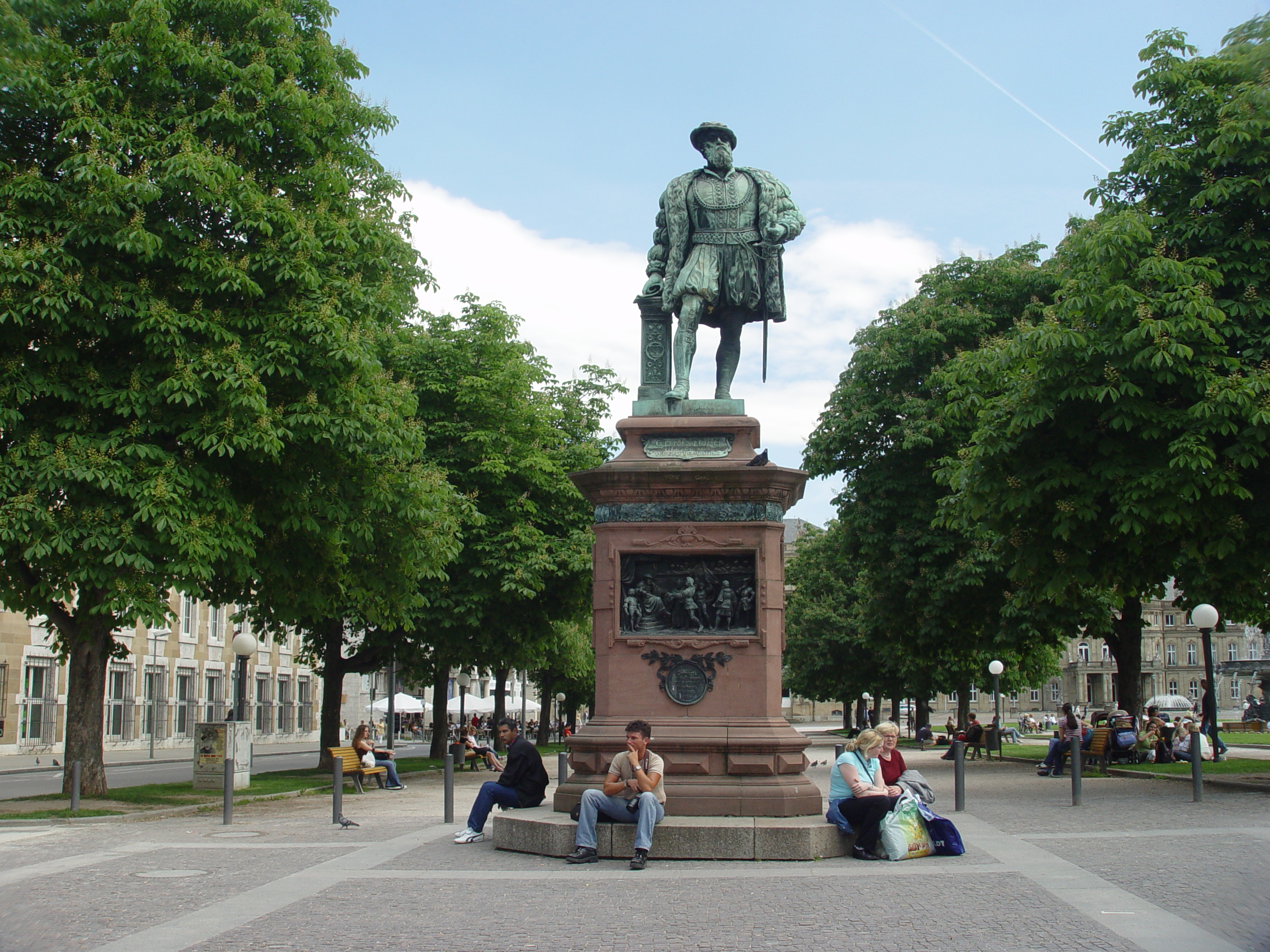
Monument for Christoph in Stuttgart

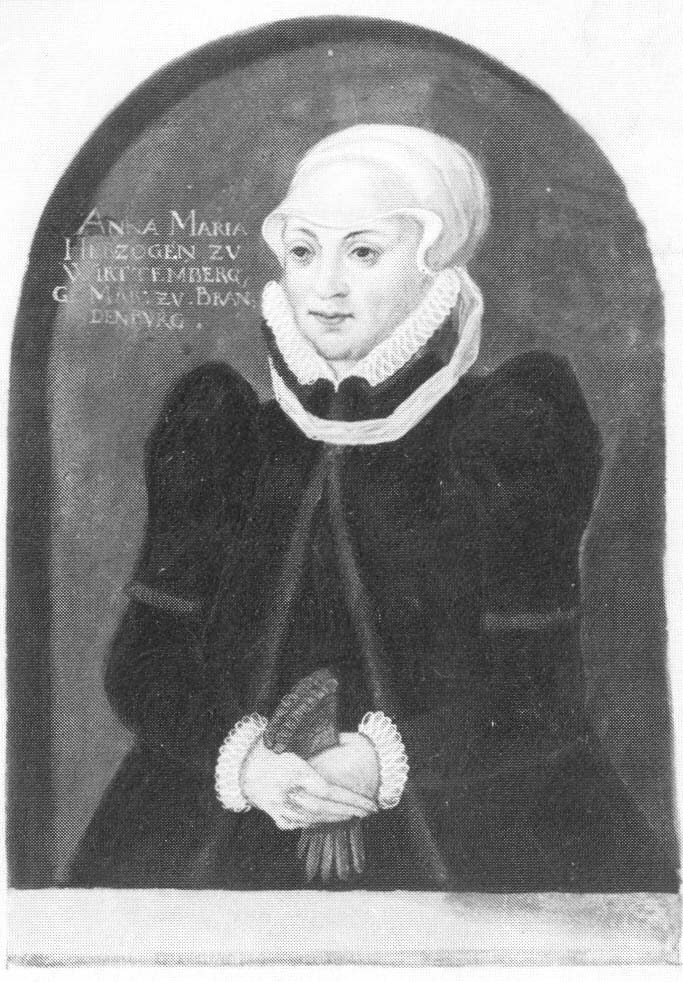
Anna Maria of Brandenburg-Ansbach

- Eberhard (7 January 1545 – 2 May 1568)
- Hedwig (15 May 1547 – 4 March 1590) – married Louis IV, Landgrave of Hesse-Marburg
- Elisabeth (3 March 1548 – 28 February 1592) – married (1) Georg Ernst (1511–1583), Count von Henneberg-Schleusingen; (2) Georg Gustav (1564–1634), Count Palatine of Veldenz-Lauterecken
- Sabine (2 July 1549 – 17 August 1581) – married William IV, Landgrave of Hesse-Kassel
- Emilie (19 August 1550 – 4 June 1589) – married Reichard (1521–1598), Count Palatine of Simmern-Sponheim
- Eleonore (22 March 1552 – 12 January 1618) – married Joachim Ernest, Prince of Anhalt; (2) George I, Landgrave of Hesse-Darmstadt
- Ludwig I (1 January 1554 – 8 August 1593) – succeeded as Duke of Württemberg
- Maximilian (27 August 1556 – 17 March 1557)
- Ulrich (May 1558 – 7 July 1558)
- Dorothea Maria (3 September 1559 – 23 March 1639) – married Otto Heinrich, Count Palatine of Sulzbach
- Anna (12 June 1561 – 7 July 1616) – married (1) Duke John George of Oława; (2) Duke Frederick IV of Legnica
- Sophie (20 November 1563 – 21 July 1590) – married Friedrich Wilhelm I, Duke of Saxe-Weimar

== Ancestors ==
Ancestors of Christoph, Duke of Württemberg

8. Ulrich V, Count of Württemberg
4. Henry, Count of Württemberg
9. Elisabeth of Bavaria-Landshut
2. Ulrich, Duke of Württemberg
10. Simon VII Wecker, Count of Zweibrücken-Bitsch
5. Elisabeth of Zweibrücken-Bitsch
11. Elisabeth of Lichtenberg
1. Christoph, Duke of Württemberg
12. Albert III, Duke of Bavaria
6. Albert IV, Duke of Bavaria
13. Anna of Brunswick-Grubenhagen-Einbeck
3. Sabina of Bavaria
14. Frederick III, Holy Roman Emperor
7. Kunigunde of Austria
15. Eleanor of Portugal

== Sources ==
- Breyer, Mirko (1952). O starim i rijetkim jugoslavenskim knjigama: bibliografsko-bibliofilski prikaz. Izdavački zavod Jugoslavenske akademije znanosti i umjetnosti.
- Hohkamp, Michaela (2007). "Sisters, Aunts, and Cousins: Familial Architectures and the Political Field in Early Modern Europe". In Sabean, David Warren; Teuscher, Simon; Mathieu, Jon (eds.). Kinship in Europe: Approaches to Long-Term Development (1300-1900). Berghahn books. pp. 91–104.

Christoph, Duke of Württemberg House of Württemberg Born: 12 May 1515 Died: 28 December 1568
Regnal titles
| Preceded by Ulrich | Duke of Württemberg; 1550–1568 | Succeeded by Ludwig I |
