= John George of Ohlau =

John George
- Duke of Oława, Wołów
- Coat-of-arms of Silesian Piasts
- Born: 17 June 1552; Ohlau (Oława)
- Died: 6 July 1592 (aged 40); Oława
- Noble family: Silesian Piasts
- Spouse: Anna of Württemberg
- Issue: George Christoph; Barbara
- Father: George II the Pious
- Mother: Barbara of Brandenburg

John George of Ohlau (Polish: Jan Jerzy oławski) (17 June 1552 – 6 July 1592), was a Duke of Ohlau and Wohlau Wołów (since 1586 with his brother as a co-ruler until 1592).

He was the second son of George II the Pious, Duke of Brieg-Ohlau-Wohlau (Brzeg-Oława-Wołów), by his wife Barbara, daughter of Joachim II Hector, Elector of Brandenburg.

== Life ==
In 1586, after the death of his father, John George and his older brother Joachim Frederick inherited (as a co-rulers) only Ohlau and Wohlau, because Brieg was given by his late father to their mother Barbara until her own death. Both brothers settled their residence in Ohlau.

== Marriage and issue ==
In Brzeg on 16 September 1582, John George married with Anna (Stuttgart, 12 June 1561 – Haynau (Chojnów), 7 July 1616), daughter of Christoph, Duke of Württemberg. They had two children:

1. George Christoph (13 May 1583 – 10 May 1584).
2. Barbara (8 February 1586 – 16 April 1586).

On his death without surviving male issue, John George was succeeded by his brother Joachim Frederick, who became in sole ruler, but only in Wohlau, because Ohlau was given by John George's widow. Anna lost her land when she married again in 1594 with Duke Frederick IV of Liegnitz, and reverted to Joachim Frederick, who two months later also obtain Brieg when his mother Barbara died.

John George of Ohlau House of Piast Born: 17 June 1552 Died: 6 July 1592
Preceded by George II the Pious	Duke of Oława with Joachim Frederick; 1586–1592	Succeeded by Anna
Preceded by George II the Pious	Duke of Wołów with Joachim Frederick; 1586–1592	Succeeded by Joachim Frederick
