= Frederick IV of Liegnitz =

Frederick IV
- Duke of Legnica
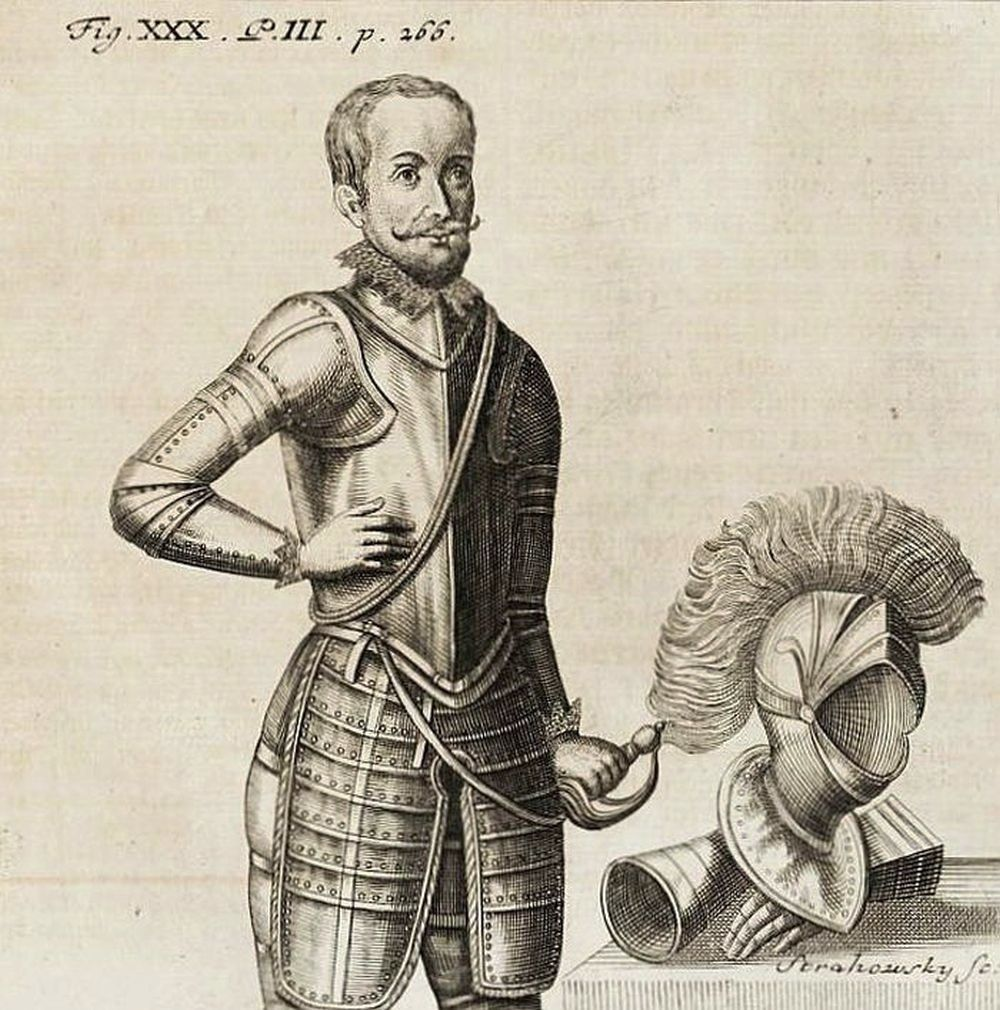
- Frederick IV, Duke of Legnica, engraving by Bartholomäus Strachowsky, 1733
- Born: 20 April 1552
- Died: 27 March 1596 (aged 43)
- Noble family: Silesian Piasts
- Spouses: Maria Sidonia of Cieszyn; Dorothea of Schleswig-Holstein-Sonderburg; Anna of Württemberg
- Father: Frederick III of Legnica
- Mother: Katharina of Mecklenburg

Frederick IV, Duke of Legnica (20 April 1552 – 27 March 1596) was Duke of Legnica from 1571 until his death (as a co-ruler of his elder brother during 1571–1576 and 1580–1581).

He was the third but second surviving son of Frederick III, Duke of Liegnitz, by his wife Katharina, daughter of Henry V, Duke of Mecklenburg. He was named after his brother Frederick, who died in 1551, one year before his birth.

== Life ==
In December 1571 he was named co-ruler of the Duchy of Legnica, under the tutelage of his brother Henry XI. Frederick IV decided to use the commitment to Henry XI in the religious war in France to be released from the guardianship of his brother. He went to the Emperor Maximilian II, asking a review of his divisionary treaty. Special Commissioners under imperial decree on 13 March 1576 that Frederick IV was the sole ruler of Liegnitz and one month later, on 17 April, he formally took possession of the government. Frederick IV was obliged to provide Henry XI's family, who remained in Silesia, to all their needs and, included cash and food. At the same time the date of the formal division of Liegnitz was set on 29 September 1577. However, this didn't happen, because Emperor Maximilian II died on 12 October 1576, and the new Emperor, Rudolf II, tried to re-examine the case. On 5 October 1580 the Emperor issued a favorable sentence against the elder brother, canceling the 17 April 1576 Decree. The brothers were named again co-rulers of the Duchy. Henry XI made his official residence in Liegnitz, and Frederick IV was forced to retired to Haynau (Chojnów).

The situation changed in the following year, when the insubordination of Henry XI (who even refused to pay homage) led to the intervention of the imperial troops. Despite his victory, Henry XI had to obtain forgiveness and decided to appear in Prague, but Rudolf II decided to deprive him of the government. Legnica was given again to Frederick IV as a sole ruler, but was required (like the first time) to ensure all the needs of the family of Henry XI (who remained as an Imperial prisoner), paying them the sum of 30 talers for week.

== Marriages and Issue ==
On 20 January 1587, Frederick IV married firstly with Maria Sidonia (b. 10 May 1572 – d. 3 October 1587), daughter of Wenceslaus III Adam, Duke of Cieszyn. They had one daughter:

1. Maria Katharina (b. 17 September 1587 – d. 20 September 1587).

On 23 November 1589, Frederick IV married secondly with Dorothea (b. Kolding, 16 October 1569 – d. Legnica, 5 July 1593), daughter of John II, Duke of Schleswig-Holstein-Sonderburg. They had two children:

1. A son (b. and d. 25 May 1592).
2. A son (b. and d. 25 June 1593).

On 24 October 1594, Frederick IV married thirdly with Anna (b. Stuttgart, 12 June 1561 – d. Haynau, 7 July 1616), daughter of Christoph, Duke of Württemberg and widow of Duke John George of Ohlau. They had no children.

After his death without surviving male issue, Frederick IV was succeeded by his cousin Joachim Frederick, son of George II the Pious.

Preceded by Henry XI	Duke of Legnica with Henry XI; 1571–1576	Succeeded by Henry XI
Preceded by Henry XI	Duke of Legnica with Henry XI (until 1581); 1580–1596	Succeeded by Joachim Frederick
