= Eleonore of Württemberg =

German author of remedy book (1552 – 1618)

- Landgravine of Hesse-Darmstadt
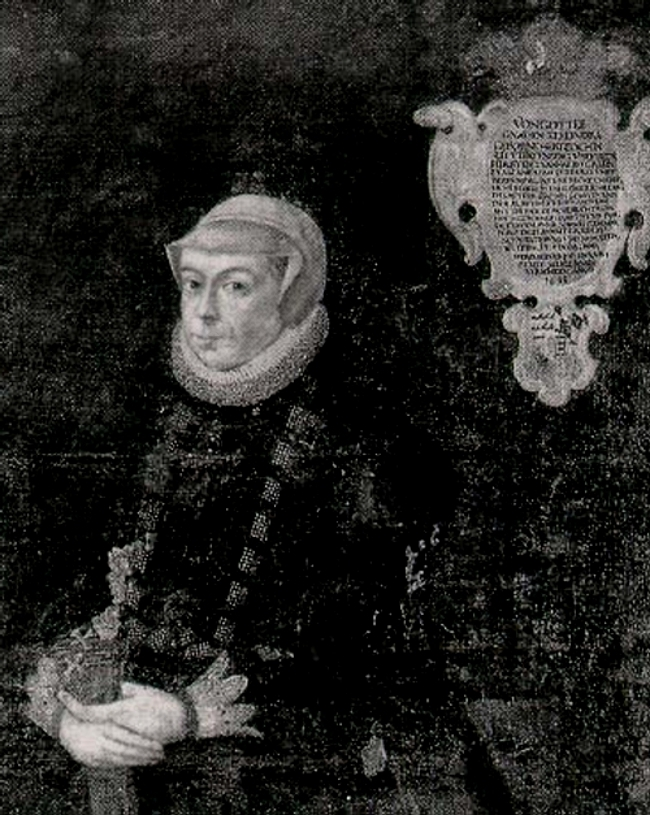
- Born: 1552
- Died: 1618 (aged 65–66)
- Burial: Stadtkirche Darmstadt
- Spouse: Joachim Ernest, Prince of Anhalt (m. 1571; died 1586) George I, Landgrave of Hesse-Darmstadt (m. 1589; died 1596)
- Issue: Agnes Hedwig of Anhalt; Dorothea Maria of Anhalt; Augustus, Prince of Anhalt-Plötzkau; Rudolph, Prince of Anhalt-Zerbst; Louis I, Prince of Anhalt-Köthen; Anna Sophie of Anhalt
- House: Württemberg
- Father: Christopher, Duke of Württemberg
- Mother: Anna Maria of Brandenburg-Ansbach

Eleonore of Württemberg (also called Eleanore of Hesse-Darmstadt, 1552–1618) was a German noblewoman who published a treatise of medicinal remedies.

== Life ==
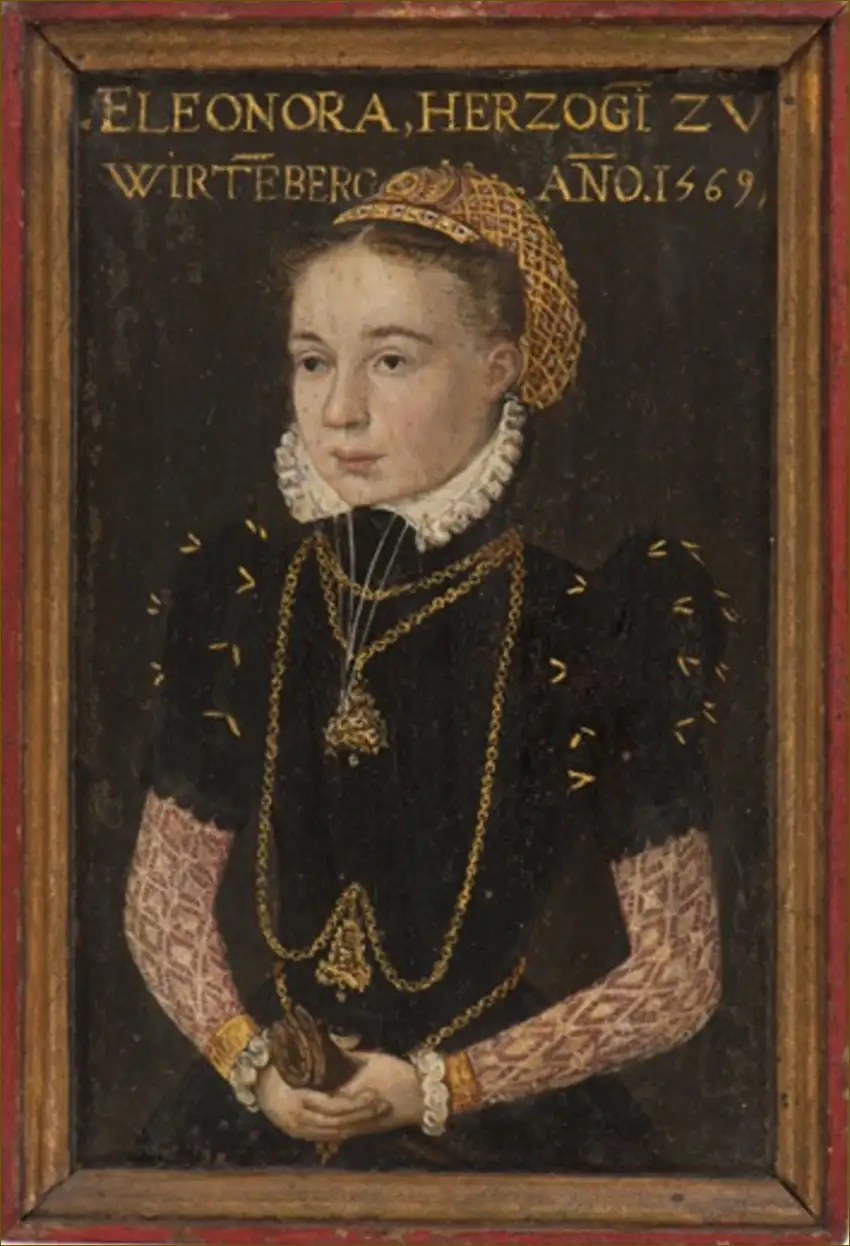
Eleonore as a teenager in 1569

She was the fifth daughter of Duke Christoph and Duchess Anna Maria of Württemberg. Anna Maria shared her knowledge of healing with her daughters, who went on to be known for their charitable medical activities: for example, Sabine of Württemberg founded a pharmacy in Kassel.

Eleonore was the second wife of Joachim Ernst von Anhalt. They had seven children. Her stepdaughter from this marriage, Sibylla of Anhalt, followed her influence and kept a court pharmacy at Stuttgart and Leonberg.

In 1589, she became the second wife of Georg I, Landgrave of Hesse-Darmstadt and moved to Darmstadt with most of her children. She and George had one child, who did not survive. Georg died in 1596, after which Eleonore remained a widow until her death in 1618. She was buried with Georg in the Stadtkirche Darmstadt.

A committed Lutheran, she criticised three of her sons for adopting Calvinism. Her and her daughters’ Lutheran beliefs were publicly reaffirmed in their respective funeral sermons.

== Remedy book ==
In 1600, Eleonore published Sechs Bücher auserlesener Artzney und Kunst-Stücke, fast vor alle des menschlichen Leibes Zufälle, Gebrechen und Kranckheiten (Six Books of Exquisite Medicine and Skills for Almost All Human Bodily Ailments and Illnesses). The book notes that she had tried most of the recipes herself. It was printed by her brother-in-law, Friedrich Wilhelm I, Duke of Saxe-Weimar. The book went through three limited editions in her lifetime, perhaps intended to be circulated as a high-status gift.

The book was reissued as Weimar Book of Medicine in 1678 and several of its recipes were used in Eleonora Maria Rosalia of Troppau and Jägerndorf’s popular book of remedies in 1695.
