= Barbara of Brandenburg, Duchess of Brieg =

Barbara of Brandenburg
- Duchess of Brieg
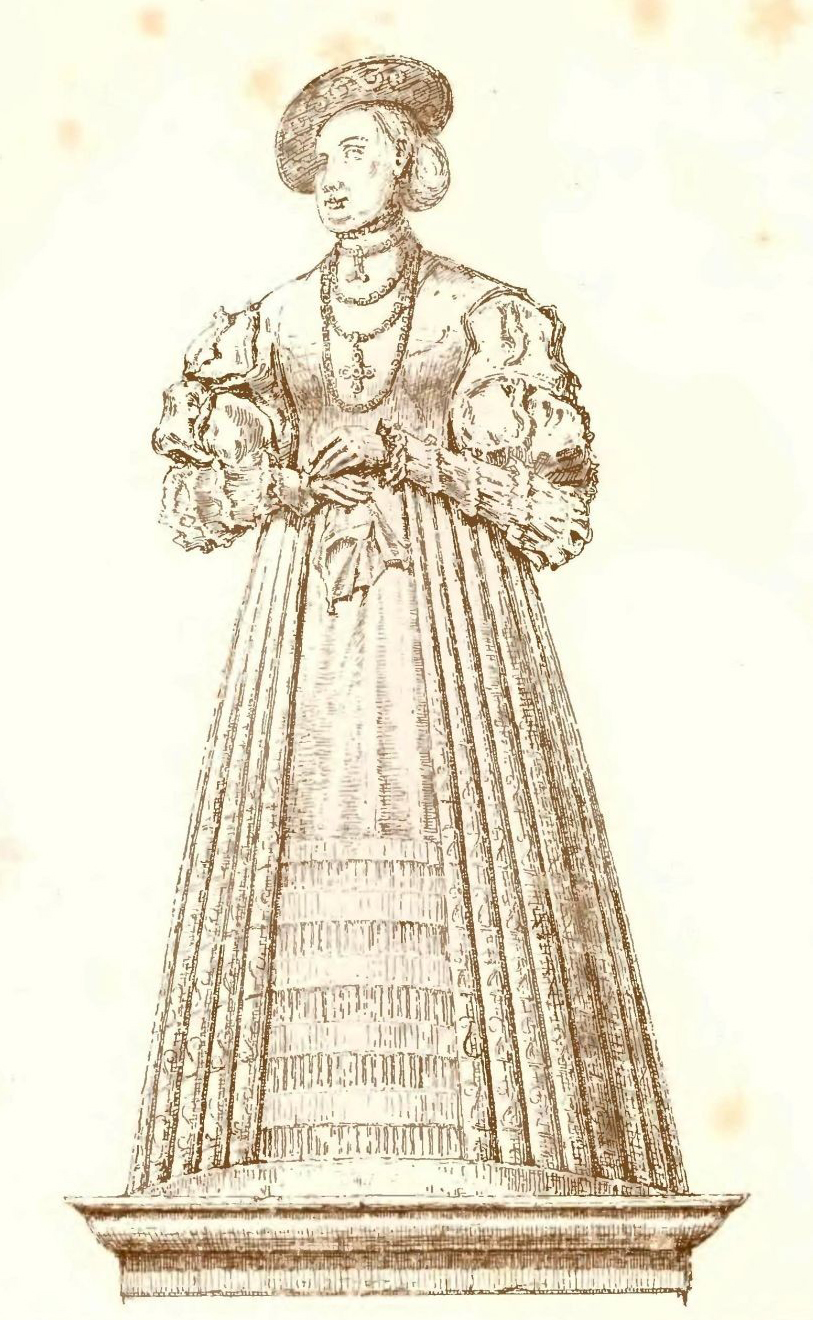
- Born: 10 August 1527
- Died: 2 January 1595 (aged 67); Brieg
- Spouse: George II of Brieg
- Issue: 7, including: Joachim Frederick; John George
- House: Hohenzollern
- Father: Joachim II Hector, Elector of Brandenburg
- Mother: Magdalena of Saxony

Barbara of Brandenburg (10 August 1527 – Brzeg, 2 January 1595), was a German princess member of the House of Hohenzollern She was a Margravine of Brandenburg by birth and by marriage a Duchess of Brieg (Brzeg).

She was the second child but eldest daughter of Joachim II Hector, Elector of Brandenburg, by his first wife Magdalena, daughter of George, Duke of Saxony.

== Life ==
In 1537 Barbara was betrothed to George (later George II the Pious), second son of Duke Frederick II of Legnica as a part of the alliance signed between her father and Frederick II. The wedding took place eight years later, on 15 February 1545 in her homeland, Berlin. In the same ceremony, the marriage of her brother John George with Frederick II's daughter, Sophie, was performed. As a dowry, Barbara received the amount of 20,000 Rhenish florins, which was provided by the citizens of Brzeg.

Two years later (1547), Duke Frederick II died and George inherited the Duchy of Brzeg, which included the towns of Oława, Strzelin, Niemcza, Kluczbork, Byczyna, Wołów and Ścinawa. In all, Barbara bore her husband seven children, two sons and five daughters.

Duke George II died on 7 May 1586, after forty-one years of marriage. In his will, he left the Duchy of Brzeg to his wife as her dower with the full sovereignty over this land until her own death. The duchies of Oława and Wołów were received by her sons Joachim Frederick and John George as co-rulers, and because Barbara was the duchess in Brzeg, both brothers decided to settle their residence in Oława.

After Barbara's death, Brzeg was inherited by her only surviving son Joachim Frederick, because her other son, John George, already died in 1592.

Barbara of Brandenburg, Duchess of Brieg House of Hohenzollern Born: 10 August 1527 Died: 2 January 1595
Preceded by George II the Pious	Duchess of Brzeg; 1586–1595	Succeeded by Joachim Frederick
