= Henry XI of Legnica =

Thrice Duke of Legnica: 1551–1556 (under regency), 1559–1576 and 1580-1581

Henry XI
- Duke of Legnica
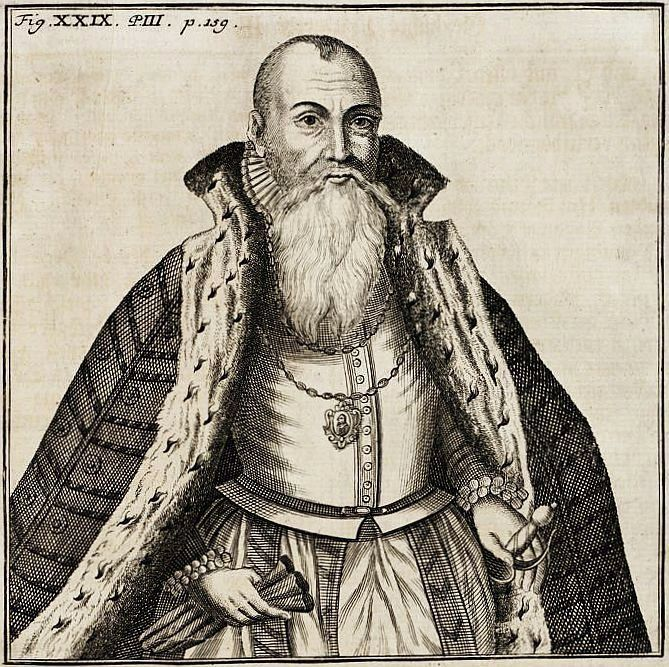
- Henry XI, Duke of Legnica
- Born: 23 February 1539; Legnica
- Died: 3 March 1588 (aged 49); Kraków
- Noble family: Silesian Piasts
- Spouse: Sophie of Brandenburg-Ansbach
- Issue: Katharina Sophie; Anna Maria; Emilia
- Father: Frederick III of Legnica
- Mother: Katharina of Mecklenburg-Schwerin

Henry XI of Legnica (Polish: Henryk XI Legnicki; 23 February 1539 – 3 March 1588), was thrice Duke of Legnica: 1551–1556 (under regency), 1559–1576 and 1580–1581.

He was the eldest son of Frederick III, Duke of Legnica, by his wife Katharina, daughter of Henry V, Duke of Mecklenburg-Schwerin.

== Life ==
=== Early years ===
Henry XI was born in Legnica Castle on 23 February 1539. In 1551, Henry XI's father was removed from the dukedom of Legnica by Emperor Charles V. The decision was dictated by the Emperor because Frederick III joined the coalition of Protestant rebel princes, and also supported the long-time enemy of the Habsburgs, King Henry II of France. Henry XI was chosen as the new Duke of Legnica, but because he was only twelve years old, regents were appointed by the Duchy, the Imperial governor, and the Bishop of Wrocław, Balthasar von Promnitz and George II the Pious, Duke of Brzeg (Frederick III's younger brother), in whose court Henry spent several years studying science. After the abdication of Emperor Charles V in 1556, Frederick III (after promising obedience and loyalty to the new Emperor Ferdinand I) regained the Duchy of Legnica.

=== Duke of Legnica ===
On 27 October 1559, Emperor Ferdinand I decided to remove Frederick again from dukehood, this time for good. As Henry XI was already an adult, this time he took over the rule over Legnica without regents. Frederick III was placed under house arrest, where he was held for the next eleven years until his death on 15 December 1570.

Henry XI inherited his father's duchy, which was bankrupt, the debt being 80,000 thalers. The new duke, instead of gradually repaying the debt, increased it dramatically, leaving at the end of his reign a debt amounting to 700 000 thalers.

As Duke of Legnica, Henry XI tried to refinance the debt. In 1567 he proposed to the estates to abolish the Głogów privilege, which guaranteed the right the right of the duke to take over the subject's domains after his heirless deaths; for 120,000 thalars. However, the idea wasn't accepted. On 24 December 1571, Henry XI tried to induce his subjects to pay off his debts, offering against their own goods and valuables. Also declared their devotion in return for a fixed salary, ensuring that corresponding to his position on the social level. Given the failure of the proposals, Henry XI decided to keep in captivity the representatives of the Legnica states until they signed an agreement to pay taxes for almost 66 000 thalers. After regaining their freedom they fled to Vienna, where the representatives registered a complaint with the Emperor Maximilian II against the Duke of Legnica. The Emperor appointed a special committee to look into the matter.

=== Trip to the Holy Roman Empire ===
In March 1575 Henry XI, wanting to calm down the difficult situation in his Duchy, went on a journey to the Empire. During his absence Legnica was administrated by his younger brother Frederick IV, who in December 1571 was named co-ruler of the Duchy, but still remained in his ward. The trip lasted three years, during which Henry XI visited several cities including: Prague (where he took part of the coronation of Emperor Rudolf II as King of Bohemia on 22 September 1575), Worms, Regensburg, Augsburg, Heidelberg, Mainz, Speyer, Ingolstadt, Prague again, Cieszyn, Nuremberg, Strasbourg, Frankfurt, Cologne and Leipzig. During this time, Henry XI was hosted in several German courts.

While in the Electorate of the Palatinate, he joined to the army of Louis I, Prince of Condé, whose Huguenot forces clashed with the new Catholic King of France (and the former King of Poland) Henry III. With the money Henry XI received from Legnica he could pay nearly 9,000 soldiers. When the Emperor Maximilian II learned about his involvement in France's religious fights, he ordered the Duke to abandon the service. However, Henry XI refused to obey the Imperial order and remained at the side of the Prince of Condé, who give him a payment of his services. In May 1576 after the signing of the Peace of Bealieu, the religious war in France ended and with this also the services of Henry XI in the French army. No longer receiving his military salary, he soon lost all means of livelihood. The Duke began to contract debts everywhere. At that time (spring of 1577), he finally decided to return to Legnica. In total, the three-year expedition of Henry XI to the Holy Roman Empire cost 32,000 thalers.

=== Return to Legnica ===
While Henry XI fought in France, his younger brother Frederick IV decided to use that moment to be released from his guardianship. He went to the Emperor Maximilian II, asking to review the divisionary treaty of Legnica. Special Commissioners under imperial decree of 13 March 1576 declared Frederick IV as the new rule of Legnica, who formally took possession of the government one month later, on 17 April. The new duke was obliged to ensure Henry XI's family (which remained in Silesia) in all his needs, including cash and food. At the same time, the date when the Duchy of Legnica was formally divided between the brothers was set on 29 September 1577. However, that didn't happen, because Maximilian II died on 12 October 1576 and the new Emperor Rudolf II tried to re-examine the case.

The commitment of Frederick IV to pay the debts of both his brother and father and his characterized rule of prudence and economy didn't like to the Legnica nobility, accustomed to the "generous" previous rulers. For that reason, they enthusiastically welcomed Henry XI when he returned on 9 November 1577 from his long trip. Before Henry XI opened up a chance to recover power in Legnica, the death of Maximilian II (who totally disapproved him) left him at the mercy of Rudolf II, in which the coronation as Bohemian King Henry XI participated in 1575.

However, not being able to wait to settle a dispute about the Legnica patrimony, Henry XI mastered the Grodziec Castle, where he began to harass the states of his brother. Despite attempts to mediate, this situation lasted several months, until Frederick IV finally won the battle and the government of Legnica as a sole ruler. Grodziec was given to the Count of Zedlitz and on 16 November 1578, Henry XI went on a new trip to Germany, visiting Halle, Berlin and Rostock.

At that time, Henry XI's wife, Sophie of Hohenzollern, desperately asked Emperor Rudolf II for the restitution of her husband. On 5 October 1580, Rudolf II cancelled the decree of 17 April 1576 and restitute Henry XI as a rule of Legnica; however, he was compelled to share the government with his brother. Henryk XI settled his residence in Legnica, and Frederick IV was forced to move to Chojnów. On 28 October 1580, was held the ceremonial entry of Henry XI to Legnica.

The Duke of Legnica continue with his disrespectful behavior against his sovereign. Despite several months of the Imperial Decree who restored him, Henry XI wasn't required to paid homage to the Emperor, and also did not participate in the Silesian sejms. On 7 June 1581, a military expedition, meant to punish the duke, was created, led by the Imperial Governor of Silesia and Bishop of Wrocław, Marcin Gerstmann. However, the expedition failed to take over the city by surprise, since Henry XI had taken the advantage and collected food and weapons from his other cities in order to make the resistance. Therefore, began the negotiations between both parties, which have resulted in Henry XI agreed to pay tribute to Karl II, Duke of Ziębice-Olésnica (Münsterberg-Öls), and also to appear before the Emperor in Prague.

Henry XI arrived to Prague on 9 July 1581. However, he had to wait months for an audience with Emperor Rudolf II. The punishment against him was harsh: Henry XI was arrested and lost the control over Legnica, which was given again to Frederick IV, who (like the first time) was obliged to take care of Henry XI's family, paying him the sum of 30 talers weekly. The first year of captivity Henry XI spent in Prague Castle, and the next three years at the Wroclaw castle until the spring of 1585, when was transferred to Schweidnitz. From there, on 30 September 1585, and after bribing the guards, Henry XI managed to escape. He was pursued by the troops of the new Bishop of Wrocław, Andrew Jerin and his own uncle George II the Pious, Duke of Brzeg. However, they didn't have success, and after four days digging through forests, Henry XI managed to flee to Poland, where he spent the rest of his life.

=== Trip to Poland ===
Henry XI had very good relations with the Jagiellon dynasty. He was related to them in many ways: his grandfather Frederick II of Legnica married firstly with Princess Elisabeth, daughter of King Casimir IV and secondly with Sophie of Brandenburg-Ansbach (Henry XI's grandmother and in turn granddaughter of King Casimir IV), and Frederick II's brother, George I of Brieg married with Anna of Pomerania, another granddaughter of Casimir IV. King Sigismund II August was even patronize Henry XI's father, Frederick III. In 1569 the Duke of Legnica accepted the invitation of the Polish King and participated in the Sejm in Lublin, where was concluded the Union of Lublin. At the meeting with Sigismund II August, he gave Henry XI two lions and precious jewels. This trip to Poland brought to the Duke of Legnica an undoubtedly splendor, but also a high cost, 24,000 thalers.

In January 1575 Henry XI participated in the funeral of the Bishop of Poznań, Adam Konarski; there he consolidated a close friendship with the late Bishop's younger brother, John. And the summer of that year came to Kraków, in an effort support his own candidacy to the Polish throne.

After Henry XI escaped to Poland both Emperor Rudolf II and Duke George II of Brzeg unsuccessfully tried to convince to King Stefan Bathory to bring him back. Immediately after the imperial envoy Andrzej Opaliński came to the Polish court, he went on a journey through the land of their ancestors. Henry XI visited Kruszwica, Łowicz and Warsaw. Then he went to Grodno, where he remained at the side of the King for the next three weeks. At the end of his trip he went to Królewiec (now Kaliningrad) to visit his relative, Albert Frederick, Duke of Prussia.

During the election in 1586 Henry XI supported the candidacy of Sigismund Vasa of Sweden. He even was sent as a personal envoy of Queen Anna of Poland to Stockholm in order to guarantee her support to Sigismund. In a short time he managed to establish a friendly relations with the King-elect, who promised him that every diplomatic effort to recover his patrimony. On 9 December 1587 Henry XI took part in the coronation of Sigismund III Vasa as King of Poland.

=== Death ===
Henry XI died unexpectedly on 3 March 1588 in Kraków. The mysterious circumstances around his death suggested foul play by the Habsburg court was involved. Because Henry XI was Lutheran, his funeral and burial caused several problems. The Duke's daughters and brother asked for the removal of the body and its return to Legnica. Emperor Rudolf II opposed these plans and refused to permit the entry of the body of a rebel in his country. Temporarily, the Duke's coffin was deposited with the Franciscans in Kraków, who in return for accepting the body of a Protestant demanded a payment and assurances that the body would soon be removed. However, the Duke's family failed to gain the Imperial approval and after a few months the coffin was directly exposed to the street. Eventually, thanks to the efforts of his family and many Silesians, on 9 November 1588 the coffin was finally placed in the Church of the Visitation of the Blessed Virgin Mary, Kraków.

== Marriage and issue ==
In the Legnica Castle on 11 November 1560, Henry XI married Sophie (1535 – 1587), daughter of George, Margrave of Brandenburg-Ansbach. Their relationship was contentious. Both had strong personalities and the public quarrels between them were mostly because of Henry XI's affairs with other women. They had six children:

1. Katharina Sophie (b. 7 August 1561 – d. Schloss Friedrichsburg bei Vohenstrauss, 10 May 1608), married on 26 February 1587 to Frederick, Count Palatine of Zweibrücken-Vohenstrauss-Parkstein.
2. Anna Maria (b. 3 January 1563 – d. Amberg, 28 February 1620).
3. Emilia (b. 26 December 1563 – d. Schloss Friedrichsburg bei Vohenstrauss, 9 November 1618).
4. A son (b. and d. before 16 January 1565).
5. George Frederick (b. 11 September 1565 – d. 14 November 1565).
6. Sabina Barbara (b. 8 January 1571 – d. 14 December 1572).

Of his two sons, the elder was either stillborn or died shortly after birth, and the second lived only three months; of his four daughters, the youngest lived 23 months. His eldest daughter, Katharina Sophie, by marriage Countess Palatine of Zweibrücken-Vohenstrauss-Parkstein, gave birth to a daughter and twin sons, but all died before five months of age. Without proper dowries, his other two daughters Anna Maria and Emilia remained unmarried.

Preceded by Frederick III	Duke of Legnica; 1551–1556	Succeeded by Frederick III
Preceded by Frederick III	Duke of Legnica with Frederick IV (since 1571); 1559–1576	Succeeded by Frederick IV
Preceded by Frederick IV	Duke of Legnica with Frederick IV; 1580–1581	Succeeded by Frederick IV
