= Frederick III of Legnica =

Frederick III
- Duke of Legnica
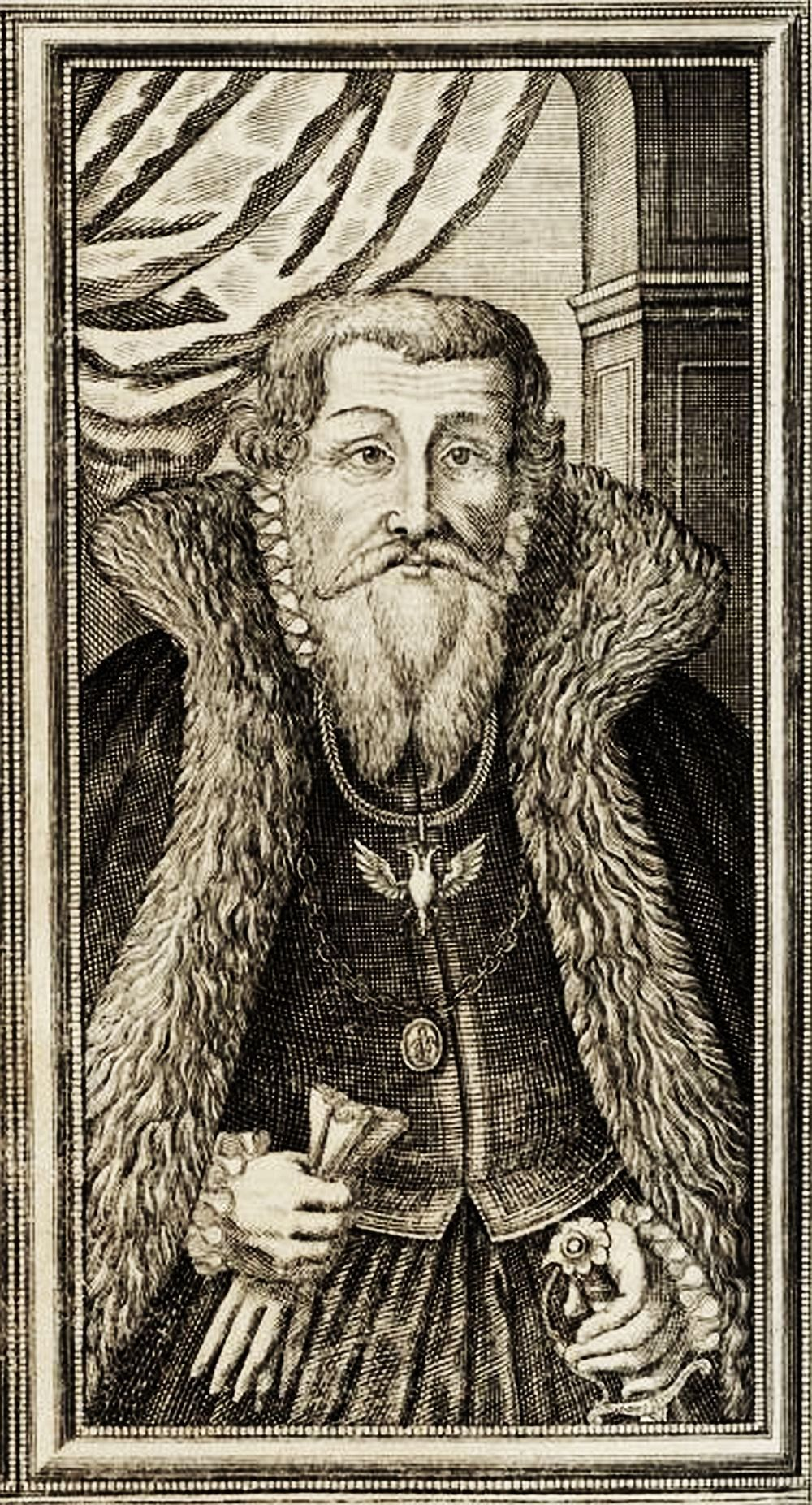
- Frederick III, Duke of Legnica, engraving by Bartholomäus Strachowsky, 1733.
- Born: 22 February 1520
- Died: 15 December 1570 (aged 50)
- Noble family: Silesian Piasts
- Spouse: Katharina of Mecklenburg-Schwerin
- Issue: Henry XI of Legnica; Katharina; Helena; Frederick IV of Legnica
- Father: Frederick II of Legnica
- Mother: Sophie of Brandenburg-Ansbach

Frederick III, Duke of Legnica (Polish: Fryderyk III Legnicki) (22 February 1520 – 15 December 1570) was a Duke of Legnica, or Leignitz, during 1547–1551 and 1556–1559 (both times was deposed by Habsburgs Emperors Charles V and Ferdinand I).

He was the eldest son of Frederick II, Duke of Legnica-Brzeg, by his second wife Sophie, daughter of Frederick I, Margrave of Brandenburg-Ansbach.

== Life ==
After the death of his father in 1547, Frederick III succeeded him in Legnica. His younger brother George II (George II the Pious) took possession of Brzeg.

From the start of his reign he sided against the rule of Emperor Charles V, and joined the Coalition of Protestant rebel princes and made an alliance with the long-time enemy of the Habsburgs, King Henry II of France. This behavior motivated Charles V to invade the Duchy of Legnica, and depose Frederick III in 1551. His eldest son Henry XI was made the new Duke, but as he still a minor, he rules under the regency of his uncle George II of Brzeg.

The abdication of Charles V in 1556 changed Frederick III's situation; the new Emperor, Ferdinand I, restored him in Legnica after his formal promise of obedience and loyalty to him.

Frederick III's conduct forced the Emperor to depose him for a second time (27 October 1559), this time for good. Henry XI was placed again as a Duke of Legnica and Frederick III was placed under house arrest until his death in Legnica eleven years later.

== Marriage and issue ==
In Legnica on 3 March 1538, Frederick III married Katharina (14 April 1518 – 17 November 1581), daughter of Henry V, Duke of Mecklenburg-Schwerin. They had six children:

1. Henry XI (b. Schloss Liegnitz, 23 February 1539 – d. Kraków, 3 March 1588).
2. Sophie (b. 15 April 1541 – d. 7 August 1542).
3. Katharina (b. 7 February 1542 – d. 3 September 1569), married on 28 December 1563 to Frederick Casimir of Cieszyn.
4. Frederick (b. 29 August 1543 – d. bef. 1551).
5. Helena (b. March 1545/47 – d. 16 September 1583), married in 1568 to Siegmund II of Kurzbach-Militsch, Baron of Trachenberg.
6. Frederick IV (b. 20 April 1552 – d. 27 March 1596).

Preceded by Frederick II	Duke of Legnica; 1547–1551	Succeeded by Henry XI
Preceded by Anna	Duke of Lubin; 1550–1551	Succeeded by Henry XI
Preceded by Henry XI	Duke of Legnica; 1556–1559	Succeeded by Henry XI
