= George II of Brieg =

Duke of Brzeg from 1547 to 1586

George II
- Duke of Brzeg
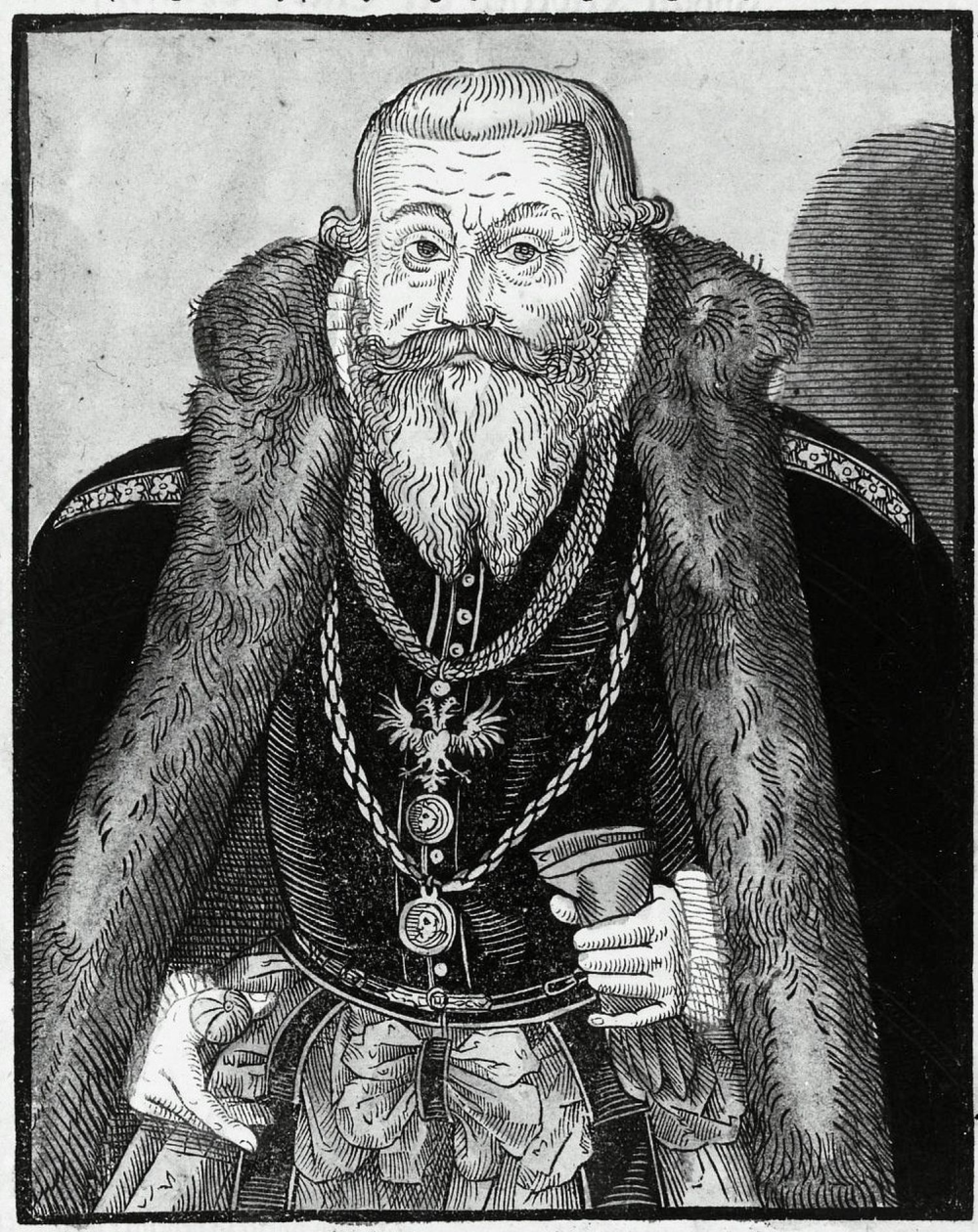
- Born: 18 July 1523; Legnica
- Died: 7 May 1586 (aged 62); Brzeg
- Noble family: Silesian Piasts
- Spouse: Barbara of Brandenburg
- Issue: Joachim Frederick of Brieg; John George of Oława; Sophie; Elisabeth Magdalena
- Father: Frederick II of Legnica
- Mother: Sophie of Brandenburg-Ansbach

George II of Brieg (18 July 1523, in Legnica – 7 May 1586, in Brzeg), was a Duke of Brzeg from 1547 until his death.

He was the second son of Frederick II, Duke of Legnica-Brzeg, by his second wife Sophie, daughter of Frederick I, Margrave of Brandenburg-Ansbach.

== Life ==
After the death of his father in 1547, George II inherited the Duchy of Brzeg (which included the towns of Oława, Strzelin, Niemcza, Kluczbork, Byczyna, Wołów and Ścinawa).

In 1548, the early death of his relative Henry II of Poděbrady, made him the regent of his Duchy of Oleśnica on behalf of his sons Henry III and Charles II until 1569. Three year later, in 1551, the insubordination of his elder brother Frederick III of Legnica caused his deposition from the government and the appointing of his infant son Henry XI of Legnica as the new Duke of Legnica. George II became in the regent of the Duchy on behalf of his nephew, jointly with Balthasar von Promnitz, until 1556, when Frederick III managed to return to Legnica and retake the power.

During all his reign he maintain a good relationship to the Habsburgs (despite being a Lutheran) and was sent by the Emperor in some diplomatic missions. In 1548, George II took part in the coronation of Maximilian II in Prague and Bratislava, and also used the Bryeg army to maintain the internal order of the Duchy (Police Regulation of 1577). In particular, he dedicated himself to the expansion of his main residence, Brzeg, where he built a magnificent Renaissance palace, which was later destroyed by Frederick II the Great during the siege of Brzeg. As a Lutheran, he was totally committed with the reforms started by his father. He also built the Gymnasium (high school) in Brzeg (1564–1569) and, after the fire of Brzeg in 1569, the new City Hall and the towers of the St. Nicholas Church.

== Marriage and issue ==
In Berlin on 15 February 1545, George II married with Barbara (b. 10 August 1527 – d. Brzeg, 2 January 1595), daughter of Joachim II Hector, Elector of Brandenburg. They had seven children:

1. Barbara (b. 24 September 1548 – d. 29 September 1565).
2. Joachim Frederick (b. 29 September 1550 – d. Brzeg, 25 March 1602).
3. John George (b. 17 June 1552 – d. Ohlau, 6 July 1592).
4. Sophie (b. 19 November 1556 – d. 24 August 1594).
5. Magdalena (b. 14 October 1560 – d. 2 February 1562).
6. A daughter (b. and d. 6 April 1561).
7. Elisabeth Magdalena (b. Brzeg, 17 November 1562 – d. Oels, 1 February 1630), married on 1 October 1585 to Charles II of Poděbrady, Duke of Münsterberg (Ziębice)-Oels.

On George II's death, his sons received all his domains except Brzeg, who was given to his widow until her own death.

George II of Brieg House of Piast Born: 18 July 1523 Died: 7 May 1586
Preceded by Frederick II	Duke of Brzeg; 1547–1586	Succeeded by Barbara
Preceded by Frederick II	Duke of Oława; 1547–1586	Succeeded by Joachim Frederick and John George
Preceded by Frederick II	Duke of Wołów; 1547–1586	Succeeded by Joachim Frederick and John George
