= Wołów =

Town in Lower Silesian Voivodeship, Poland

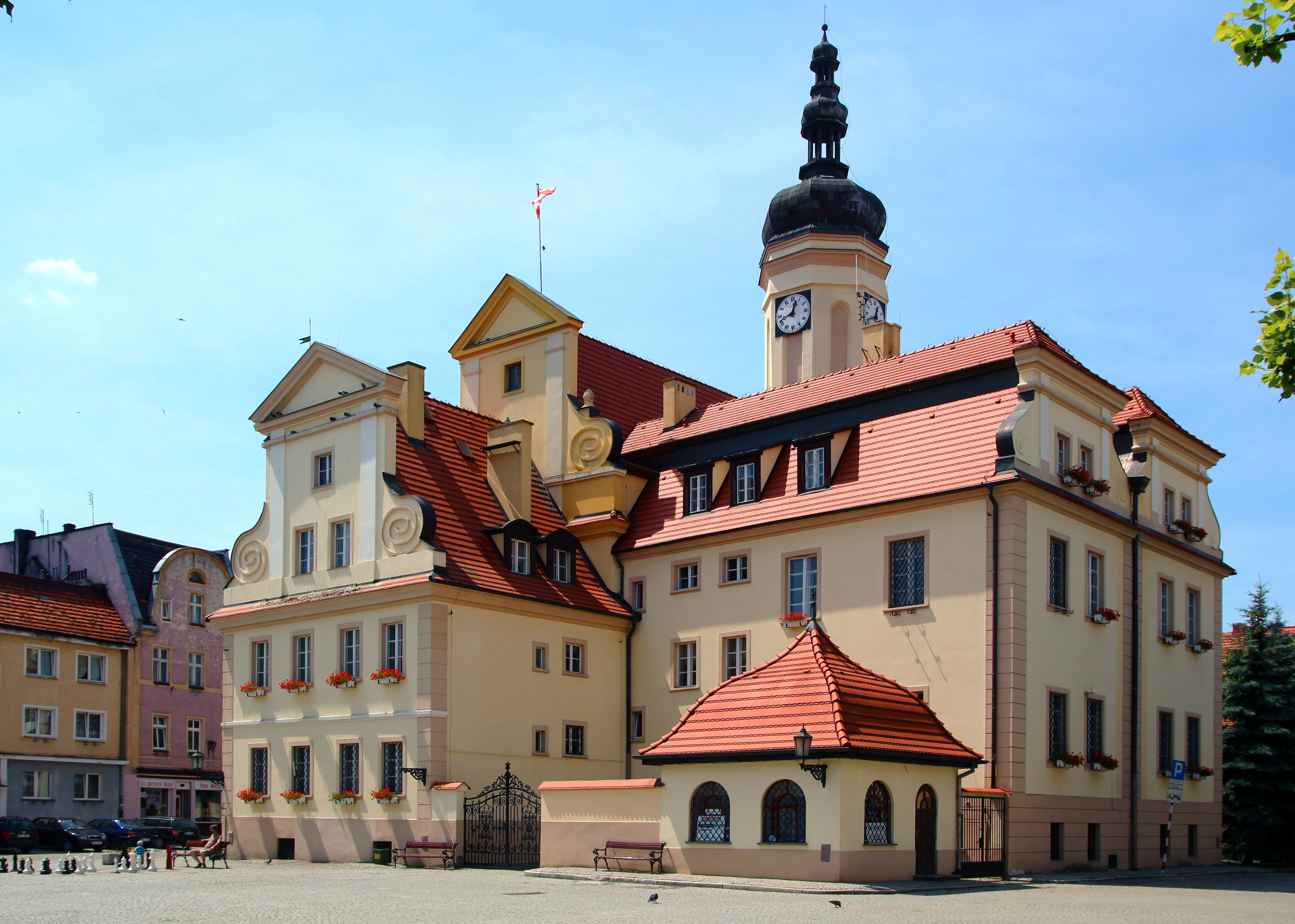
- Town hall in Wołów

- Flag Coat of arms

- Location within Poland
- Coordinates: 51°20′29″N 16°37′42″E
- Country: Poland
- Voivodeship: Lower Silesian
- County: Wołów
- Gmina: Wołów
- First mentioned: 1157
- Town rights: around 1285

Government
  - Mayor: Dariusz Chmura

Area
  - Total: 18.54 km^{2} (7.16 sq mi)

Population (2019-06-30)
  - Total: 12,373
  - Density: 667.4/km^{2} (1,728/sq mi)
- Time zone: UTC+1 (CET)
  - Summer (DST): UTC+2 (CEST)
- Postal code: 56-100
- Car plates: DWL
- Website: http://www.wolow.pl

Wołów [ˈvɔwuf] (German: Wohlau, Czech: Volov) is a town in Lower Silesian Voivodeship in south-western Poland. It is the seat of Wołów County and Gmina Wołów. As of 2019, the town has a population of 12,373. It is part of the larger Wrocław metropolitan area.

== Etymology ==
The town's name is derived from the Polish word wół ("ox").

== History ==
The area around Wołów has been settled since prehistoric times. It became part of the emerging Polish state in the late 10th century under Mieszko I of Poland. The town was first mentioned in 1157 when a wooden castle founded by Senior Duke of Poland Władysław II the Exile is documented, which developed into a castle complex, which was again mentioned in 1202. Two villages developed near the castle, one of them called Wołowo. Probably in the second half of the 13th century the town was founded near Wołowo and partially on the soil of the second village. Wołów received Magdeburg town rights about 1285 at the time of German Ostsiedlung in the region; a Vogt is mentioned in 1288.

At that time Wołów belonged to the Duchy of Głogów, after 1312 to the Duchy of Oleśnica. With the duchy it came under the suzerainty of Bohemia in 1328. Since the 15th century, the town was a center of clothmaking. From 1473 dates the oldest known seal of the town, which already shows an ox, as do all later seals. Wołów was ruled by local Polish dukes until 1492, and soon after, in 1495, it came into the possession of the Czech Podiebrad family, then in 1517 it came into the hands the Hungarian magnate Johann Thurzó, before returning to Piast rule in 1523, by passing to the Duchy of Legnica. It remained there until the Piast dukes of Legnica-Brzeg-Wołów died out in 1675. As a result of the Thirty Years' War, the town's population fell by half.

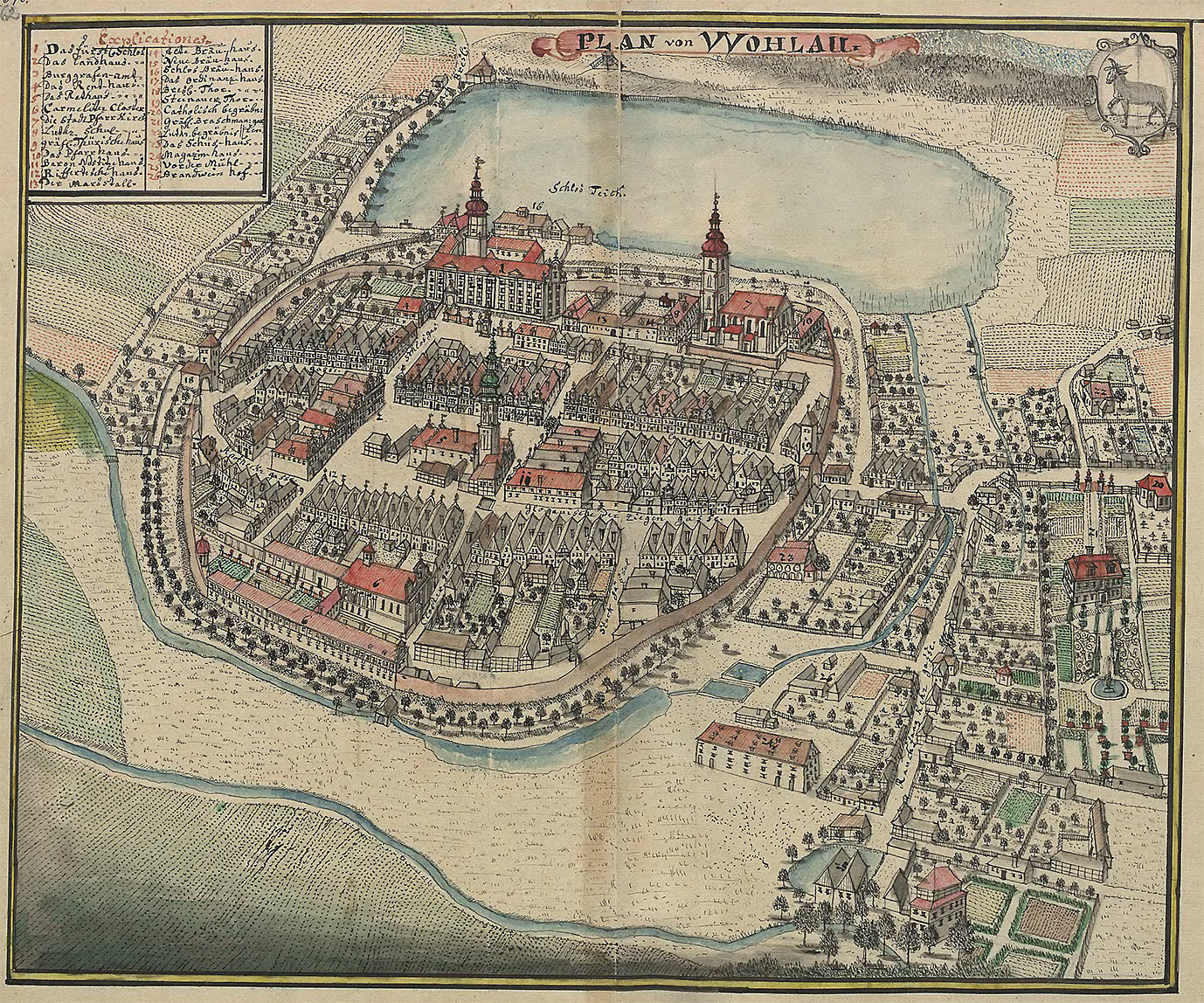
Wołów (as Wohlau) around 1750

The Protestant Reformation was introduced to the town in 1522 by duke Frederick II. After the extinction of the local Piasts the duchy passed to the House of Habsburg, which opposed the Protestant denomination in the town, as part of the Counter-Reformation. In 1682 the town's parish church was closed and given to the Catholics. According to the Treaty of Altranstädt the church however was already returned to the Protestants in 1707 and stayed Protestant until 1945. The small Catholic minority in return received a Josephinian curacy.

In 1742 Wołów was annexed by Prussia. The duchy was divided into two districts and the town became county seat of one of the districts. The structure of the town was, until 1700, defined by craft, especially clothiers. As the seat of a duchy and a district administrative function however became more and more important. The industrialization played only a minor role and mostly affected smaller companies of the timber industry. In 1781 the city suffered a fire.

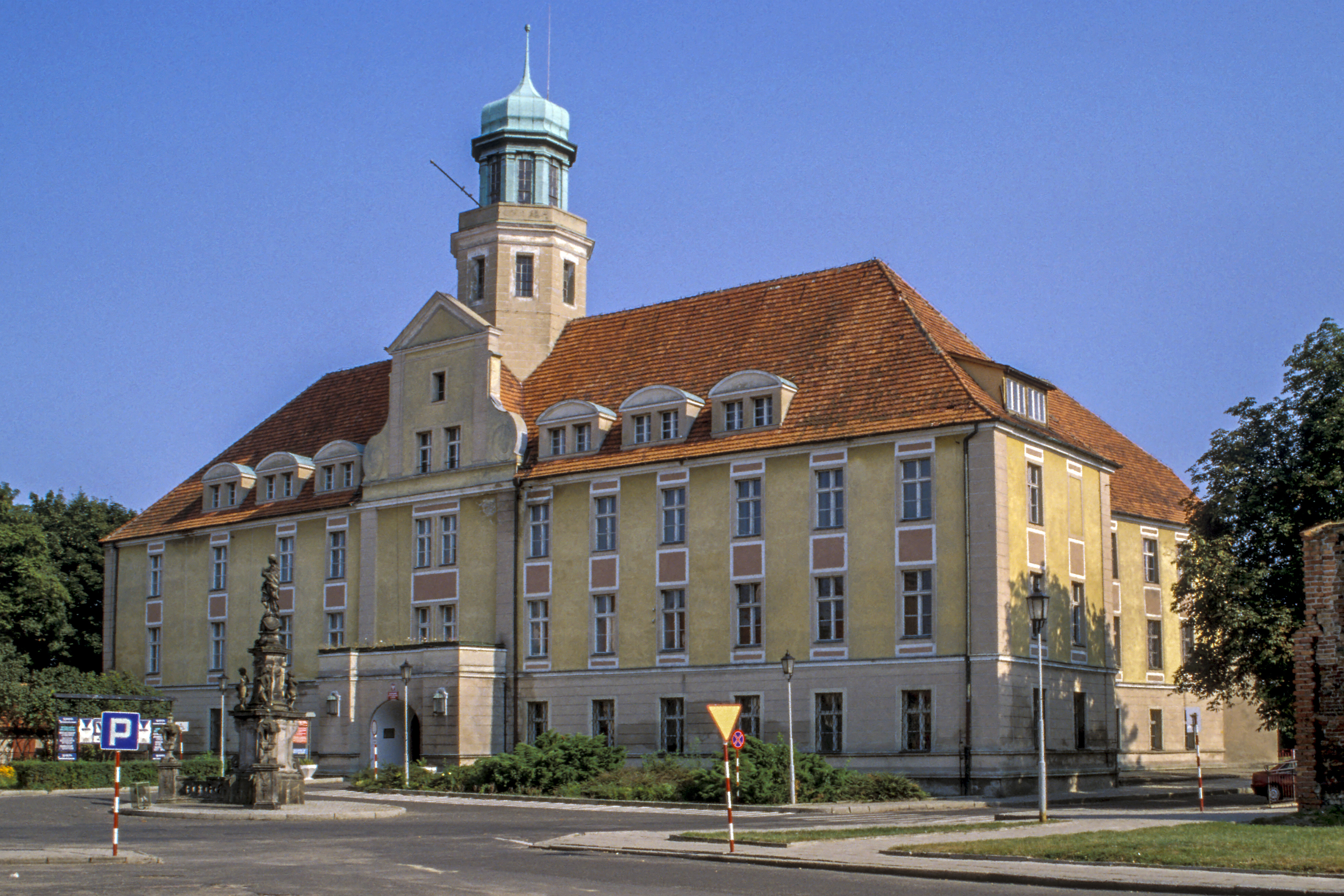
Piast Castle

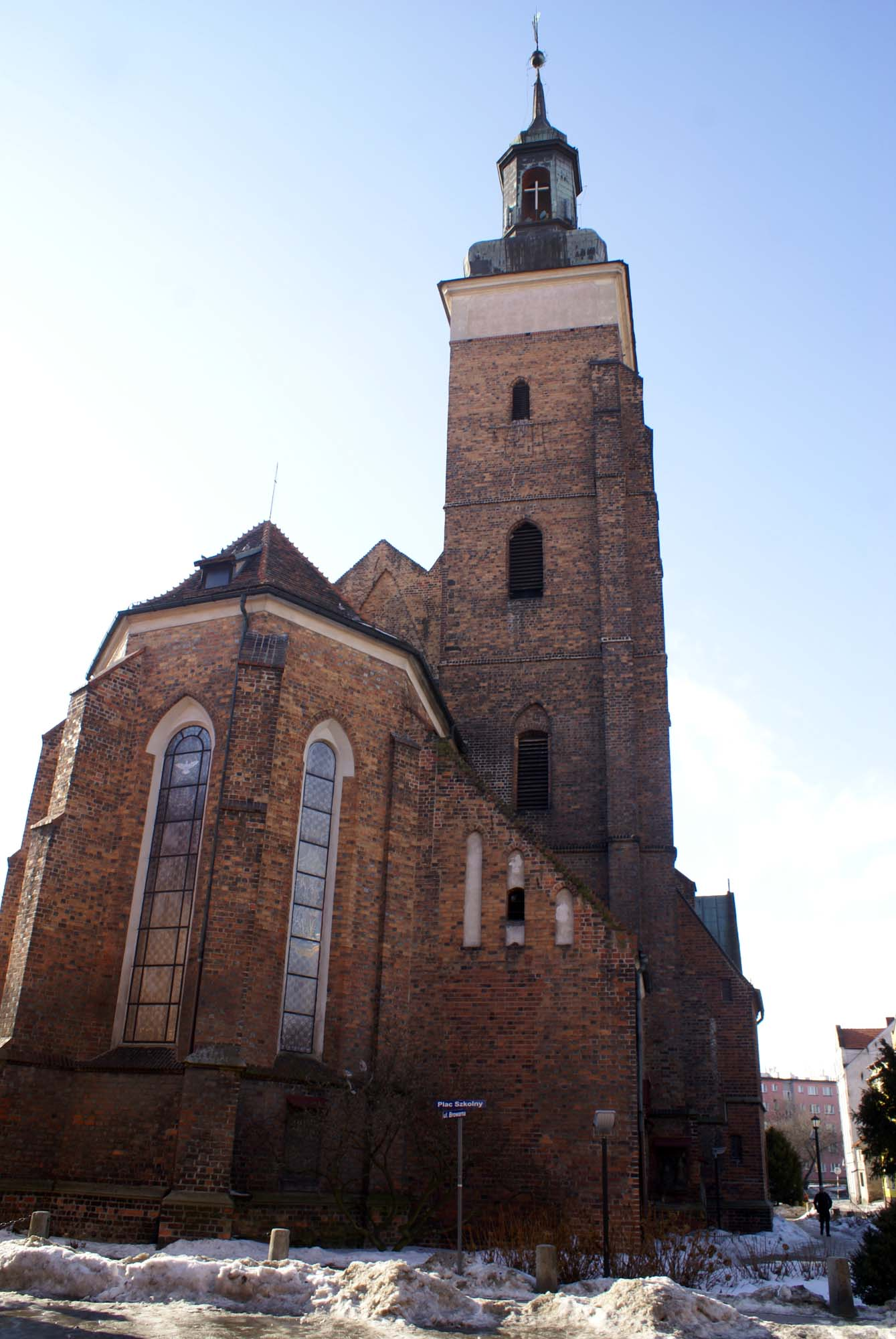
Saint Lawrence church

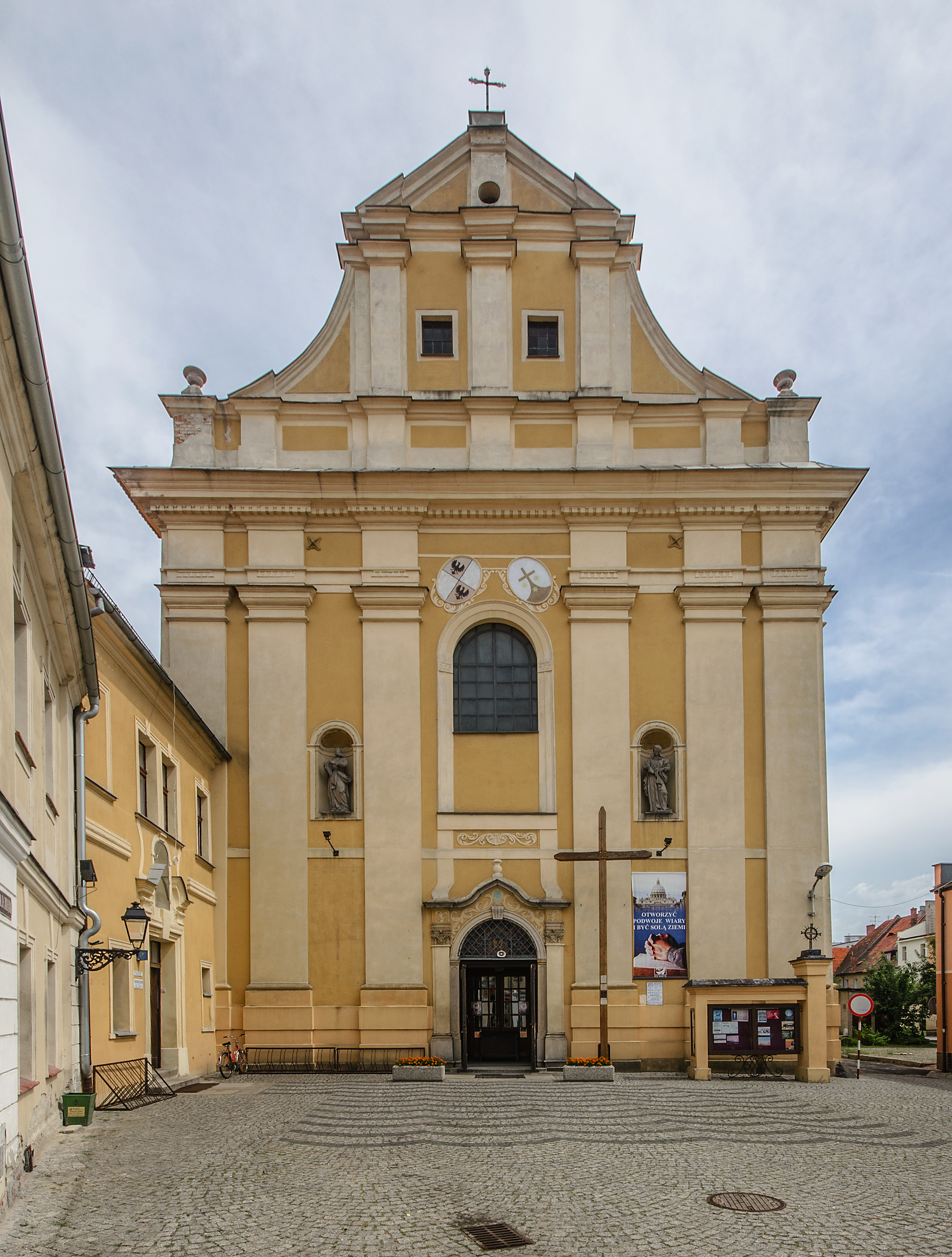
Saint Charles Borromeo church

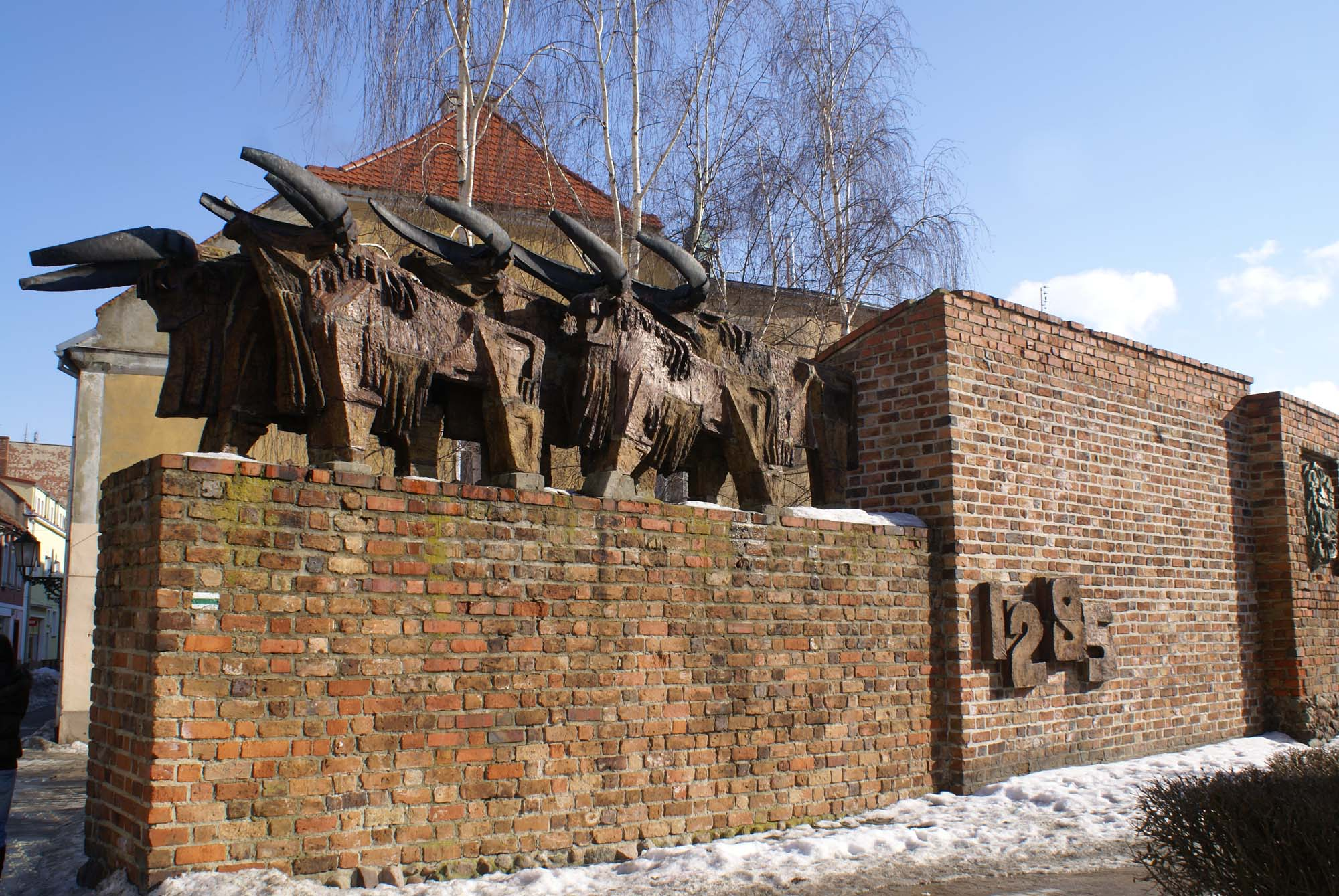
Medieval town walls (with a modern oxen monument)

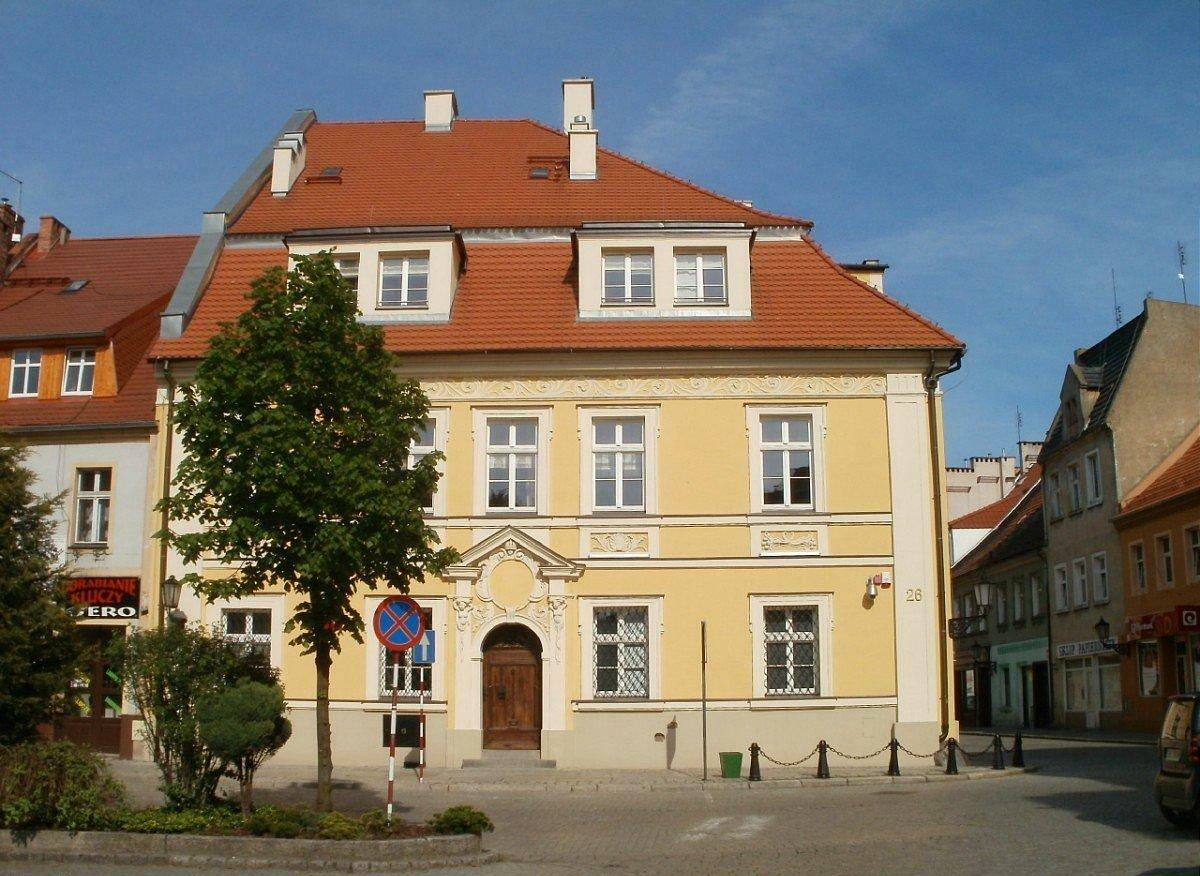
Courthouse

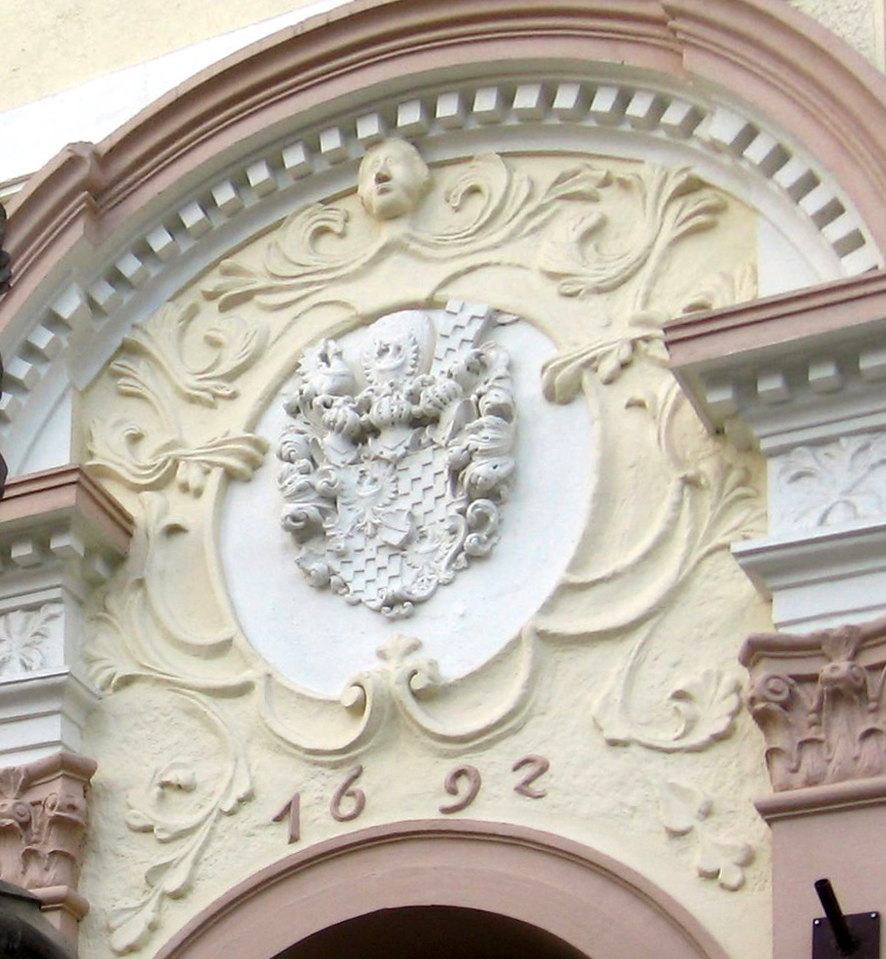
Town hall (relief of the coat of arms of the Duchy of Legnica on the facade)

During World War I, the German administration operated a forced labour camp for Allied prisoners of war in the town. During World War II, the Germans operated a youth prison in the town, with multiple forced labour subcamps in the region, including one in the town itself. In 1943–1945, the Germans carried out mass executions of Allied prisoners of war in the forest in the present-day district of Gancarz. In January 1945 – just before town was taken by the Red Army – the Wehrmacht evacuated the German population westwards. After Nazi Germany's defeat in World War II, the town became part of Poland. The totality of the town's previous population was expelled.

Deportation of Germans from the surrounding villages proceeded in 1945-46. Often, the local mayor announced at eve that families were to show up for deportation the next morning. Very often, the victims' luggage was plundered.

In 1962, the town was the site of the Wołów bank robbery, one of the largest bank robberies in Poland.

== Transport ==
Wołów lies at the intersection of vovoideship roads 343, 340, 339 and 338.

Wołów has a station on the Zielona Góra-Wrocław railway line.

== Sports ==
The local football team is MKP Wołów. It competes in the lower leagues.

== Notable people ==
- Jan II the Mad (1435–1504), Polish House of Silesian Piasts dynasty Duke of Żagań-Przewóz since 1439, died in Wołów and was buried in the local parish church
- Maria Cunitz (1610–1664), astronomer, the most notable female astronomer of the early modern era
- Oskar Müller (1896–1970), German politician
- Mirosław Hermaszewski (1941-2022), first Polish national in space

== Twin towns – sister cities ==
See twin towns of Gmina Wołów.
