= Magdalene of Saxony =

Duchess Magdalena of Saxony
- Electoral Princess of Brandenburg; Margravine of Brandenburg
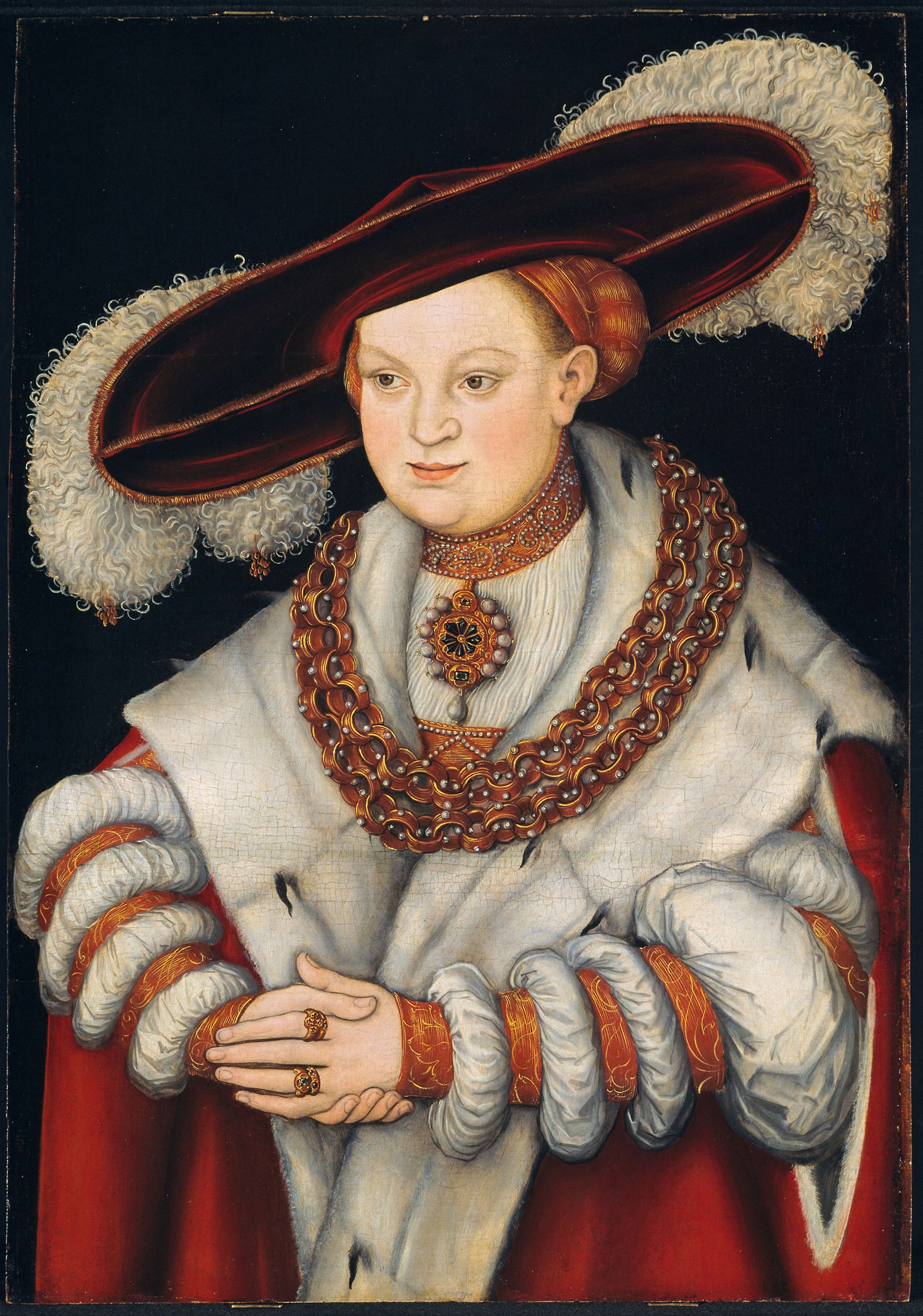
- Portrait by Lucas Cranach the Elder, c. 1529
- Born: 7 March 1507; Dresden
- Died: 25 January 1534 (aged 26)
- Spouse: Joachim II Hector, Elector of Brandenburg (m. 1524)
- Issue: John George, Elector of Brandenburg; Barbara; Elisabeth; Friedrich, Archbishop of Magdeburg; Albrecht; Georg; Paul
- House: Wettin
- Father: George, Duke of Saxony
- Mother: Barbara Jagiellon

Magdalena of Saxony (7 March 1507 – 25 January 1534) was Margravine of Brandenburg, as well as Electoral Princess of Brandenburg.

She was the daughter of George the Bearded, Duke of Saxony and Barbara. Magdalena's maternal grandparents were Casimir IV of Poland and Elisabeth of Austria, daughter of Albert II of Germany.

She was a granddaughter of the Elisabeth aforementioned, mother of the Jagiellonians, queen of Poland, who had claimed the Duchy of Luxembourg in 1460s as being the younger daughter of the last Luxembourg heiress Elisabeth of Luxembourg, Queen of Bohemia. Though by no means an heiress of her grandmother, she was intended to marry the heir of her grandmother's older sister. Joachim (1505–1571), the future elector of Brandenburg, was the eldest son and heir of their current claimant of Luxembourg, Joachim I, Elector of Brandenburg (1484–1535), the eldest son and heir of Margaret of Thuringia (1449–1501), Dowager Electress of Brandenburg, herself the eldest daughter and heiress of Anna, Duchess of Luxembourg and William of Saxony, Landgrave of Thuringia.

== Marriage and issue ==
Magdalena was thus married, at Dresden, on 6 November 1524 to her second cousin's son Joachim II Hector, the future Elector of Brandenburg. Their son was John George, another future Elector of Brandenburg. After Magdalena's death which occurred well before Joachim ascended the electorate, Joachim II Hector married Hedwig Jagiellon, daughter of King Sigismund I of Poland.

Magdalena and Joachim II Hector had seven children:

- John George, Elector of Brandenburg (1525–1598), had issue
- Barbara of Brandenburg, Duchess of Brieg (1527–1595), had issue
- Elisabeth (1528–1529)
- Frederick IV of Brandenburg (1530–1552), Archbishop of Magdeburg and Bishop of Halberstadt
- Albrecht (1532–1532)
- Georg (1532–1532)
- Paul (1534–1534)

== Ancestry ==
Ancestors of Magdalene of Saxony

8. Frederick II, Elector of Saxony
4. Albert III, Duke of Saxony
9. Margarete of Austria
2. George, Duke of Saxony
10. George of Poděbrady
5. Sidonie of Poděbrady
11. Kunigunde of Sternberg
1. Magdalena of Saxony
12. Władysław II Jagiełło
6. Casimir IV Jagiellon
13. Sophia of Halshany
3. Barbara Jagiellon
14. Albert II of Germany
7. Elisabeth of Austria
15. Elizabeth of Luxembourg
