= Helene Kottanner =

Hungarian courtier and writer

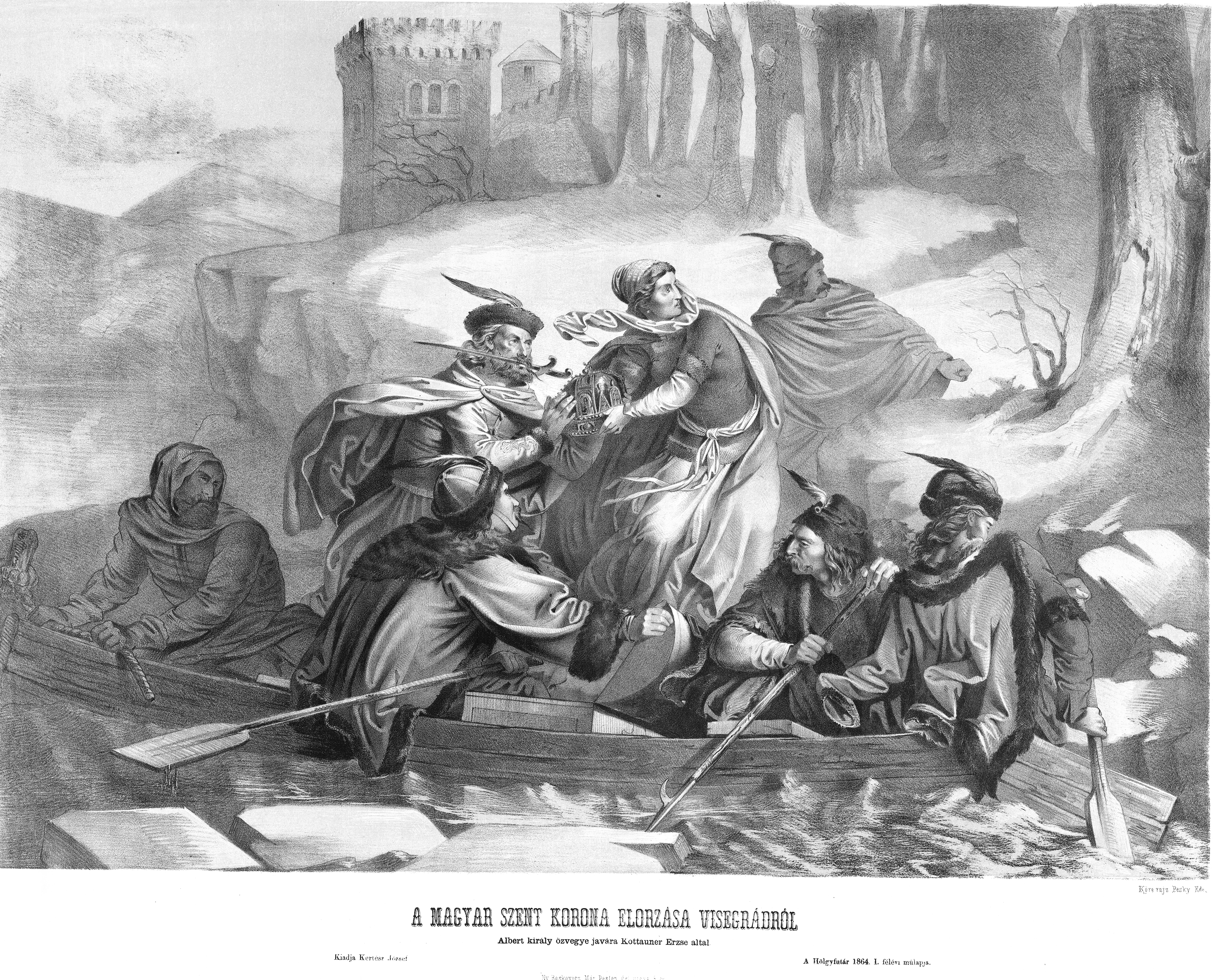
- Helene Kottanner and her accomplices steal the Holy Crown from the castle of Visegrád in February 1440
- Born: c. 1400
- Died: after 1470
- Noble family: House of Wolfram
- Spouses: 1, Peter Székeles; 2, Johann Kottanner (m. 1432)
- Issue: (1) William Székeles (2) Catherine Kottanner (2) N Kottanner (daughter)
- Father: Peter Wolfram

Helene Kottanner (née Wolfram; Hungarian: Kottanner Ilona or Kottanner Jánosné; c. 1400 – after 1470) was a Hungarian courtier and writer. Her last name is spelled variously as Kottanner, Kottanerin, or Kottannerin. She is primarily known to history as the author of memoirs about the years 1439 and 1440, when king Albert II of Germany died and his son Ladislaus the Posthumous was born. Kottanner, who dictated her life story in German, was a kammerfrau to Queen Elizabeth of Luxembourg (1409–1442). She also assisted Queen Elisabeth in a royal succession plot.

== Biography ==
=== Early life ===
Helene née Wolfram was born in c. 1400 into a minor noble family of German ancestry from the region of Sopron County. Her father was Peter Wolfram, who was still alive in 1435. Her unidentified mother lived in Sopron and was last mentioned as a living person by contemporary records in 1442. Helene understood, but did not speak Hungarian.

Kottanner married twice and bore three children. Her first husband was Peter Székeles (or Gelusch), a notable patrician in Sopron. He was already a member of the local magistrate in 1402. He served as mayor of the town from 1408 until at least 1421. He died in 1430 or 1431. They had a son, William, who lived in Austria and was involved in a lawsuit over a meadow in Sopron in 1435. Because of his illness, he did not present before the court personally, but represented by his stepfather and maternal grandfather. William was still alive in 1437.

After Székeles' death, Helene married Johann Kottanner, a burgher from Vienna, in 1432. During that time, Johann was chamberlain of the St. Stephen's Cathedral in Vienna. According to historian Karl Uhlirz, he has reached the age of majority only in 1426, thus Helene was approximately six years older than her second husband. Their marriage produced more children, including a daughter Catherine. By 1436, both Kottanner and her second husband were servants of Albert II of Germany, the then Duke of Austria, and his wife Elizabeth. Kottanner's role in this royal Habsburg household was nanny to princesses Anne and Elizabeth, the children of Albert and Elizabeth. Note that, according to the contemporary German custom of calling a wife or sometimes daughter, the alternative names ending in "-in" amount to adding a feminine suffix to her husband's name.

=== Theft of the Hungarian Crown ===
Kottanner, later a member of Elizabeth's court, wrote a memoir around 1451 entitled Denkwürdigkeiten (= Reminiscences) in which she provides a first-person account of the theft of the Hungarian Crown of St. Stephen on 20 February 1440. This was an action in which she participated at the request of Queen Elisabeth, widow of King Albert. This crown was considered holy by the Hungarian people. It was then stored at the Hungarian stronghold of Visegrád.

Kottanner noted in her memoir that she exposed herself and her family to great danger by assisting the queen in her efforts to obtain the crown. In an atmosphere of political intrigue, where death was a common punishment for many crimes, Kottanner apparently had reservations concerning the advisability of the queen's request: "The queen's request frightened me, for it meant great danger for me and my little children." In her writing she describes how she prayed for success and promised to make a barefoot pilgrimage to Zell. At least two assistants accompanied Helene, who did the breaking in while Kottanner kept watch. After they got the crown without attracting attention, they locked the doors again and fixed the queen's seal.

The crown was smuggled out of Visegrád inside a pillow. Kottanner took the crown with her in her sledge and she described worrying about the ice on the Danube breaking as she crossed it. The golden cross on top of the crown was however bent as they fled, and is still visible in this condition today.

Kottanner then brought the crown secretly to Elizabeth, who was hiding from her enemies at the castle of Komorn. (Note: Slovak: Komárno, Hungarian: Komárom, originally a Hungarian city located on both banks of the Danube, but was divided into two parts after World War I. The left bank belongs to Hungary and the right one to Slovakia. Ladislaus Posthumous was born on the right bank of the Danube which is in Slovakia now.) She witnessed the birth of Ladislaus the Posthumous, who in her eyes was the natural heir to the kingdoms of Hungary and Bohemia.

Kottanner noted in her memoir that the timing had been close: "Within the same hour in which the Holy Crown arrived from Plintenburg in Komorn, within that same hour King Laszlo was born." She further stated in her memoir that she thought that this was clearly God's will at work.

=== A new king is crowned ===
Elizabeth promised Kottanner a reward in return for her actions in obtaining the Holy Crown of Saint Stephen. At this time, only the owner of the royal insignia was considered legitimate king of Hungary. This was an important distinction since the Hungarian nobles voted for the coronation of Vladislaus I, the 16-year-old king of Poland. With his help they hoped to defend themselves better against the Turks' attacks against the Hungarian kingdom. Kottanner was present at the coronation of the infant Ladislaus V in Székesfehérvár on 15 May 1440; during the ceremony, she held the weeping baby in her hand while Archbishop Dénes Szécsi crowned him.

When finally both attendants were crowned kings of Hungary at the same time, the Polish king gathered his forces against Ladislaus the Posthumous. The royal family now separated for their own safety: While the queen tried to rescue the holy crown from the approaching Polish army, Kottanner fled with the infant king.

=== Later life ===
Helene Kottanner and her husband were granted the village of Kisfalud (present-day Vieska, Slovakia) and its accessories by Regent John Hunyadi in March 1452, for their loyal service of Ladislaus V. Hunyadi's son, King Matthias Corvinus confirmed the land donation in November 1466, and also in February 1470. Helene Kottanner died thereafter.

== Memoir ==
According to Károly Mollay, Kottanner wrote her memoirs or ordered a transcript of her narration under title Denkwürdigkeiten ("Reminiscences") around 1451, because she claimed reward herself for her services to Ladislaus V. Iván Kis considered Kottanner, by writing the memoirs, wanted to support Ladislaus' legitimate claim to the Hungarian throne, beside the preservation of her own merits. Kis refused the connection between the completion of the diary and the reward of 1452. The theft of the Holy Crown caused a decade-long civil war in Hungary and Regent John Hunyadi was considered a partisan of Vladislaus I during the conflict. Károly Mollay argued Kottanner's act was considered a sin until the representatives of the Austrian and Hungarian Estates, and the Bohemian Catholic lords aimed to force Frederick III to resign the guardianship and hand over Ladislaus V to them in 1451. The former lady-in-waiting could only claim a reward afterwards. Iván Kis argued John Hunyadi was the foremost beneficiary of the political situation in which the Holy Crown and the crowned monarch Ladislaus were taken abroad, and this may have been the motivation for the reward.

Maya Bijvoet Williamson, who translated her memoirs into English, described Kottanner as "a smart, trustworthy, common-sense, energetic, courageous, quick-witted woman", while the lady reveals extremely little about herself and her personal life. Sabine Schmolinsky argued Kottanner's diary cannot be considered an autobiography, but in addition to the history of political events, it is also an important source from a psychological and mental history point-of-view. Kottanner makes no secret of her fears, worries, compunction and religiosity. Albrecht Classen considered the memoirs as autobiography, which contains the sincere manifestations of the author. In contrast, Andreas Rüther regarded the genre of the memoirs as a memorandum, in which the real person of Kottanner does not really appear, instead the author displays herself as an exemplary, constructed figure.

In her memoirs, Kottanner frequently puts herself at the center of major political events, exaggerating her involvement and emphasizing Queen Elizabeth's confidence towards her. Constant voicing of this can be described as a rhetorical tool to highlight her participation in the events. In addition, Kottanner often complains that her role in the events required huge personal sacrifices. For instance, her court service forced her to leave her husband and minor children behind. Despite its reality content, however, the ceaseless voicing and embossing of these seems like a rhetorical tool too. Kottanner puts the narration of events in the context of the struggle between Good and Evil, placing God behind her own actions, while the impediments are attributed to the work of the Devil. Barbara Schmid emphasized the sites of divine will (e.g. Visegrád) during the narration. In this context, she presents her own party, Elizabeth, the infant Ladislaus, and herself as subjects to the grace of God, while presents their opposition, Vladislaus' party, as evil and as the enemy of God's will. In connection with this, Kottanner sought to emphasize the validity of the infant Ladislaus' legitimacy to the Hungarian throne (crowned with the Holy Crown; chosen by God; his royal aptitude and physical strength, which appeared during the coronation despite being a few weeks old). Kottanner also declared the distant ancestor King Saint Ladislaus I of Hungary as a prefiguration and role model to Ladislaus V.
