= Ursula of Brandenburg =

German noblewoman (1488-1510)

- Born: 17 October 1488; Berlin
- Died: 18 September 1510 (aged 21); Güstrow
- Buried: Doberan Minster
- Noble family: House of Hohenzollern
- Spouse: Henry V, Duke of Mecklenburg
- Father: John Cicero, Elector of Brandenburg
- Mother: Margarethe of Saxony

Ursula, Margravine of Brandenburg (17 October 1488 – 18 September 1510) was a German noblewoman.

She was born in Berlin, the daughter of John Cicero, Elector of Brandenburg, and Margarethe of Saxony.

At age 19, on 16 February 1507 she married Duke Henry V of Mecklenburg-Schwerin (1479–1552). They had three children:

1. Sophia of Mecklenburg-Schwerin (1508–1541), married Ernest I, Duke of Brunswick-Lüneburg
2. Magnus III of Mecklenburg-Schwerin (1509–1550) (predeceased his father)
3. Ursula of Mecklenburg-Schwerin (30 August 1510 – 22 April 1586), abbess of Ribnitz

She died in Güstrow in 1510 at the age of 21, less than a month after the birth of her third child.

== Ancestry ==
Ancestors of Ursula of Brandenburg

8. Frederick I, Elector of Brandenburg
4. Albrecht III, Elector of Brandenburg
9. Elisabeth of Bavaria
2. John Cicero, Elector of Brandenburg
10. Jacob, Margrave of Baden-Baden
5. Margaret of Baden
11. Catherine de Lorraine
1. Ursula of Brandenburg
12. Frederick I, Elector of Saxony
6. William III, Landgrave of Thuringia
13. Catherine of Brunswick
3. Margaret of Thuringia
14. Albert II of Germany
7. Anne, Duchess of Luxembourg
15. Elizabeth of Luxembourg
