= Anna of Brandenburg =

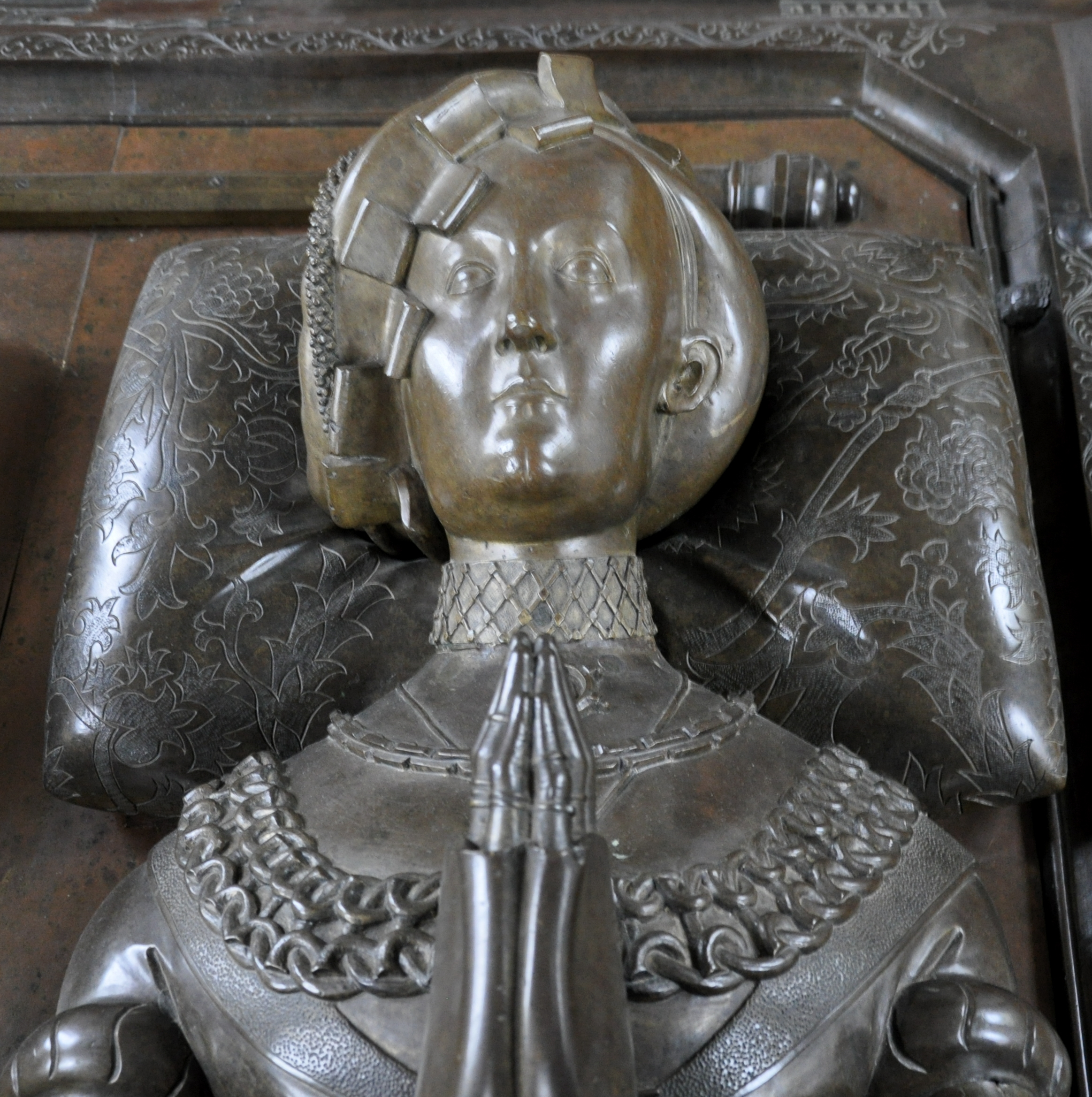
- Portrait of Anna of Brandenburg from the Bordesholm cenotaph

Duchess consort of Schleswig and Holstein
- Tenure: 1502–1514
- Born: 27 August 1487; Berlin
- Died: 3 May 1514 (aged 26); Kiel
- Spouse: Frederick I, Duke Schleswig and Holstein (m. 1502)
- Issue: Christian III of Denmark; Dorothea, Duchess of Prussia
- House: Hohenzollern
- Father: John Cicero, Elector of Brandenburg
- Mother: Margaret of Thuringia

Margravine Anna of Brandenburg (27 August 1487 – 3 May 1514) was a German noblewoman, the daughter of John Cicero, Elector of Brandenburg, and Margaret of Thuringia. By her marriage to Frederick I, Duke of Schleswig and Holstein, she became duchess consort of Schleswig and of Holstein. Anna died at the age of 26, leaving behind two children, one of whom would go on to become King of Denmark after his father, Anna's husband, who was elected to the throne in 1523.

== Marriage ==
In 1500 she was betrothed to Frederick, then Duke of Schleswig and Holstein and, after her death, king of Denmark and Norway. Because they were second cousins (Frederick's mother Dorothea of Brandenburg was the cousin of Anna's father) their marriage required a Papal dispensation. In addition, the marriage was not held until 10 April 1502 due to Anna's youth. The marriage, held in Stendal, was a double one: on the same day, Anna's brother Joachim and Frederick's niece Elisabeth were married.

Anna and Frederick had two children:

1. Christian III of Denmark (12 August 1503 – 1 January 1559)
2. Dorothea (1 August 1504 – 11 April 1547), married 1 July 1526 to Albert, Duke of Prussia

She died in 1514 at age 26. Her husband was remarried, to Sophie of Pomerania, and had six more children.

== Ancestry ==
Ancestors of Anna of Brandenburg

8. Frederick I, Elector of Brandenburg
4. Albrecht III, Elector of Brandenburg
9. Elisabeth of Bavaria
2. John Cicero, Elector of Brandenburg
10. Jacob, Margrave of Baden-Baden
5. Margaret of Baden
11. Catherine de Lorraine
1. Anna of Brandenburg
12. Frederick I, Elector of Saxony
6. William III, Landgrave of Thuringia
13. Catherine of Brunswick
3. Margaret of Thuringia
14. Albert II of Germany
7. Anne, Duchess of Luxembourg
15. Elizabeth of Luxembourg
