= Joachim II Hector =

Elector of Brandenburg from 1535 to 1571

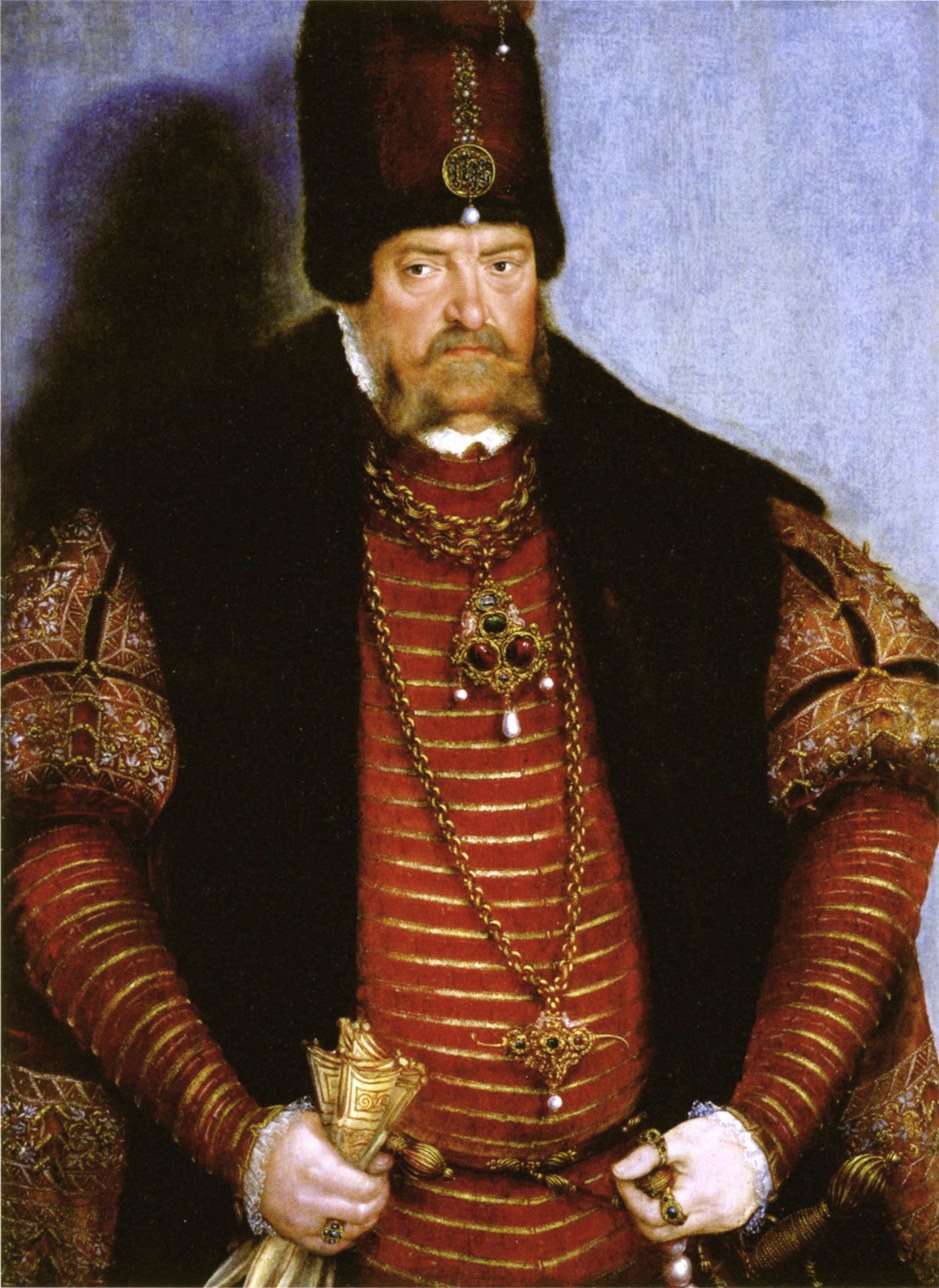
- Joachim II Hector, Elector of Brandenburg. By Lucas Cranach the Younger, 1570

Elector of Brandenburg
- Reign: 11 July 1535 – 3 January 1571
- Predecessor: Joachim I Nestor
- Successor: John George
- Born: 13 January 1505; Cölln, Margraviate of Brandenburg, Holy Roman Empire
- Died: 3 January 1571 (aged 65); Köpenick Palace, Margraviate of Brandenburg, Holy Roman Empire
- Burial: Berlin Cathedral (tomb lost, 1750)
- Spouse: Magdalena of Saxony (m. 1524; died 1534) Hedwig of Poland (m. 1535)
- Issue Detail: John George, Elector of Brandenburg; Barbara, Duchess of Brieg; Friedrich, Archbishop of Magdeburg; Elisabeth Magdalena, Duchess of Brunswick-Lüneburg; Sigismund, Bishop of Magdeburg; Hedwig, Duchess of Brunswick-Lüneburg; Sophia, Countess of Rosenberg
- House: Hohenzollern
- Father: Joachim I Nestor, Elector of Brandenburg
- Mother: Elizabeth of Denmark, Norway, and Sweden
- Religion: Lutheran (from 1539); Roman Catholic (until 1539)
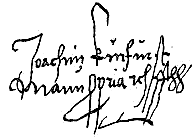
- Signature

Joachim II (German: Joachim II Hector or Hektor; 13 January 1505 – 3 January 1571) was a Prince-elector of the Margraviate of Brandenburg (1535–1571), the sixth member of the House of Hohenzollern. He was the eldest son of Joachim I Nestor, Elector of Brandenburg, and Elizabeth of Denmark, Norway, and Sweden. He received the cognomen Hector after the Trojan prince and warrior for his athel qualities and prowess.

== Biography ==
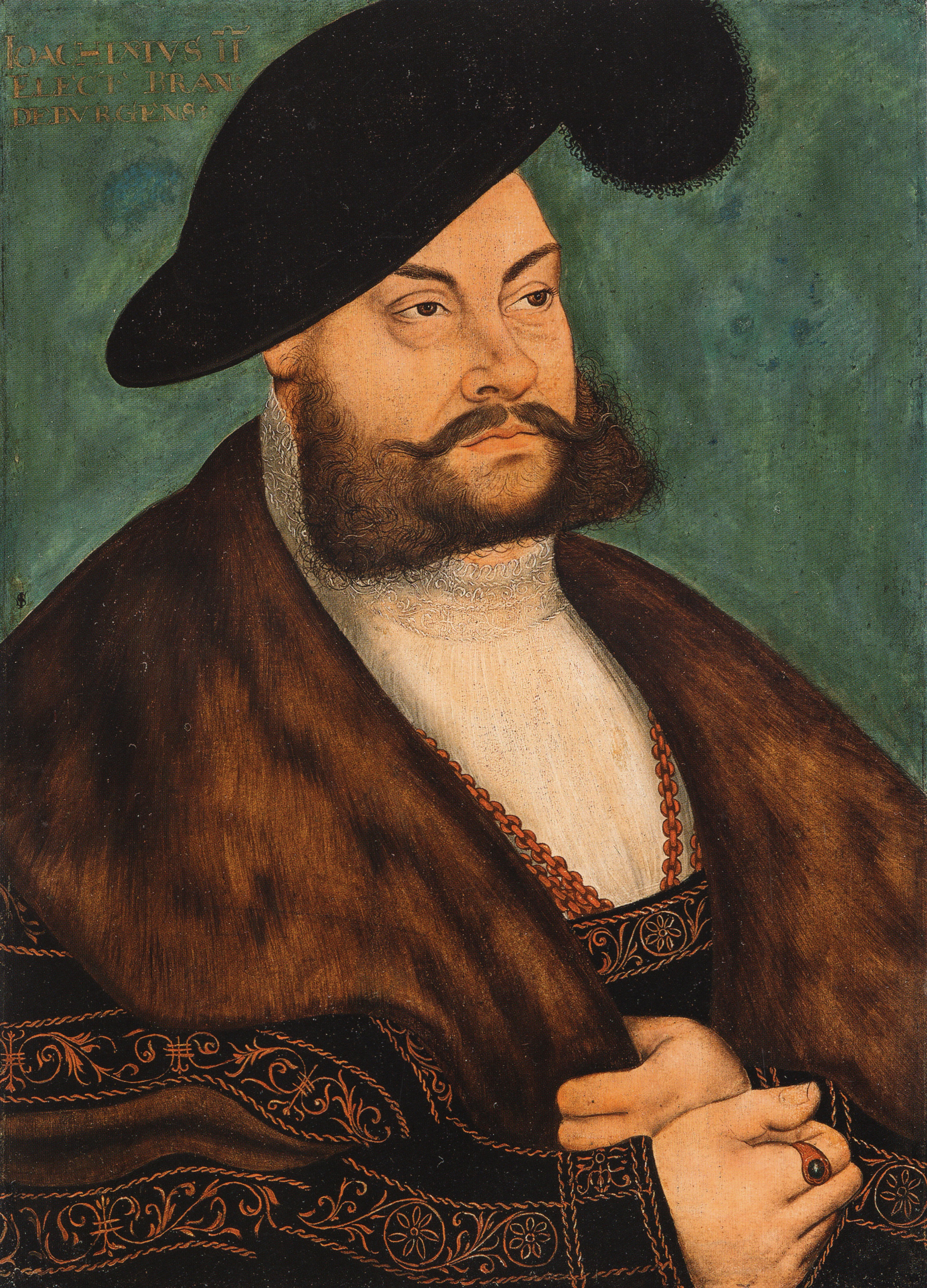
Joachim II Hector, Elector of Brandenburg, painted by Lucas Cranach the Elder

Joachim II was born in Cölln and received his education at the imperial court.

His father, Joachim I Nestor, made Joachim Hector sign an inheritance contract in which he promised to remain Roman Catholic. This was intended in part to assist Joachim Nestor's younger brother, the Archbishop-Elector Albert of Mainz. Albert had borrowed huge amounts from the banking house of Fugger in order to pay the Holy See for his elevation to the Prince-Bishopric of Halberstadt and for a dispensation permitting him to hold both the Archbishopric of Magdeburg and Archbishopric of Mainz. This provided the Hohenzollerns with control over two of the seven electoral votes in imperial elections and many suffragan dioceses to levy dues.

Joachim Nestor, who had co-financed this accumulation of offices, agreed to let Albert recover these costs by the sale of indulgences to his subjects. Joachim's neighbor, John Frederick I, Elector of Saxony, forbade the sale of indulgences, because Albert had outbid his candidate for the see of Mainz, but also on principle, being persuaded by his subject Martin Luther. Thus repayment of the debt to the Fugger depended on the sale of indulgences to Catholic believers in Brandenburg. However, had Joachim Hector not agreed to this, he would likely have been passed over in the line of inheritance.

His first marriage was to Magdalena of Saxony from the ducal Albertine line of the House of Wettin. She died in 1534.

In 1535 he married Hedwig, daughter of King Sigismund I the Old of Poland. As the Jagiellon dynasty was Catholic, Joachim II promised Sigismund that he would not make Hedwig change her religious affiliation.

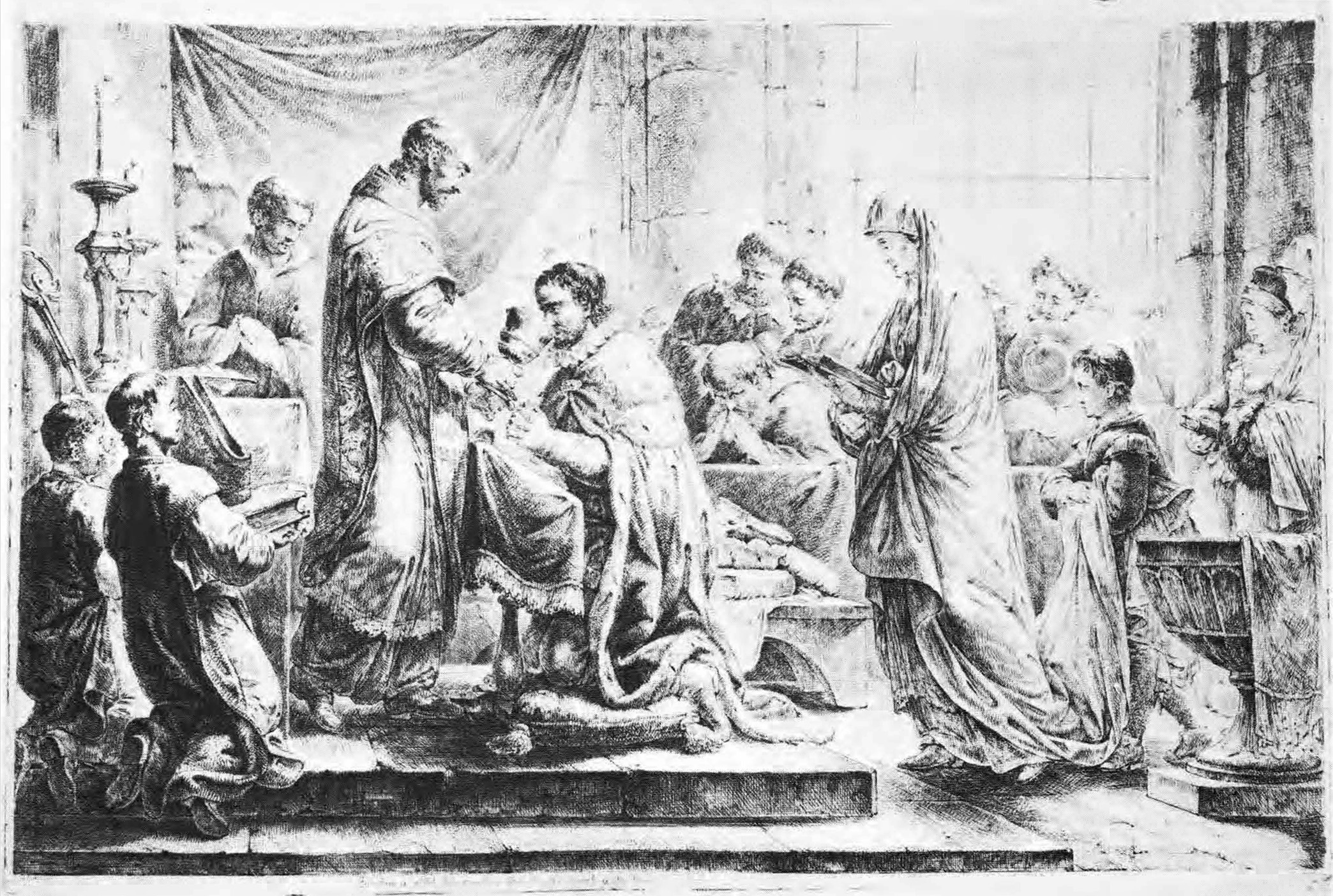
A reformed Joachim II receives the Eucharist under both kinds, the Bread and the Cup, in St. Nicholas' Church in Spandau.

With the deaths of his father Joachim Nestor (1535) and father-in-law Sigismund (1548), Joachim turned gradually to the Protestant Reformation. On 1 November 1539, he received Communion under both kinds in Spandau's St. Nicholas' Church, an act that indicated a degree of sympathy with the new religious ideas. However, Joachim did not explicitly adopt Lutheranism until 1555, to avoid open confrontation with his ally, Emperor Charles V. Prior to this, Joachim promulgated a conservative church order that was Lutheran in doctrine, but retained many traditional religious institutions and observances, such as the episcopate, much of the Mass in Latin, religious plays and feast days.

In early 1539, at the diet of princes of imperial immediacy (Fürstentag) of the Holy Roman Empire in Frankfurt, Lutheran spokesman Philipp Melanchthon revealed to the gathered princes (among them Joachim) that the anti-Jewish pogroms of 1510 in Brandenburg had been based on a feigned host desecration. This pogrom had resulted in the expulsion of the Jews from Brandenburg. The Jewish advocate Josel von Rosheim, who was also in attendance, pleaded privately with Joachim to allow the Jews to settle in the Brandenburg again. Joachim acceded to this request on 25 June 1539.

Joachim not only loved hunting in person, he also spent great sums on live lions, bears, wolves, and other beasts which he made to fight each other. He also maintained no fewer than eleven alchemists at his court over a mere ten-year period. Because of these and other extravagances, although Joachim I had left the country's finances in satisfactory order, by 1540 Joachim II was over 600,000 thalers in debt, which he attempted to pay off by confiscating church property and raising taxes.

His wife Hedwig's mother Barbara Zápolya was a sister of John Zápolya, who had claimed the vacant throne of Hungary after King Louis II was killed in battle against the Ottoman Empire in 1526. However, Joachim supported Ferdinand of Habsburg, who also claimed the crown and challenged the Turkish invaders. In 1542 Joachim assisted Ferdinand against the Ottomans at the Siege of Buda (1541). He commanded an army of Austrian, Hungarian, German, Bohemian, Italian, and Dalmatian troops, but the Elector was not a seasoned warrior and eventually beat a retreat. He was defeated again by the Ottomans in the Siege of Pest in 1542.

As a part of the alliance, in 1545 Joachim held a gala double wedding celebration for his two children, John George and Barbara. They were married to Sophie of Legnica and George, both children of the Piast Duke Frederick II of Legnica in Silesia.

Joachim was a brother-in-law of King Sigismund II Augustus of Poland. In 1569, he paid Sigismund for a deed of enfeoffment which made Joachim and his issue heirs to Ducal Prussia in case of the extinction of the Prussian Hohenzollern line.

In 1571, Joachim died in the Köpenick Palace, which he had built in 1558.

== Marriages and children ==
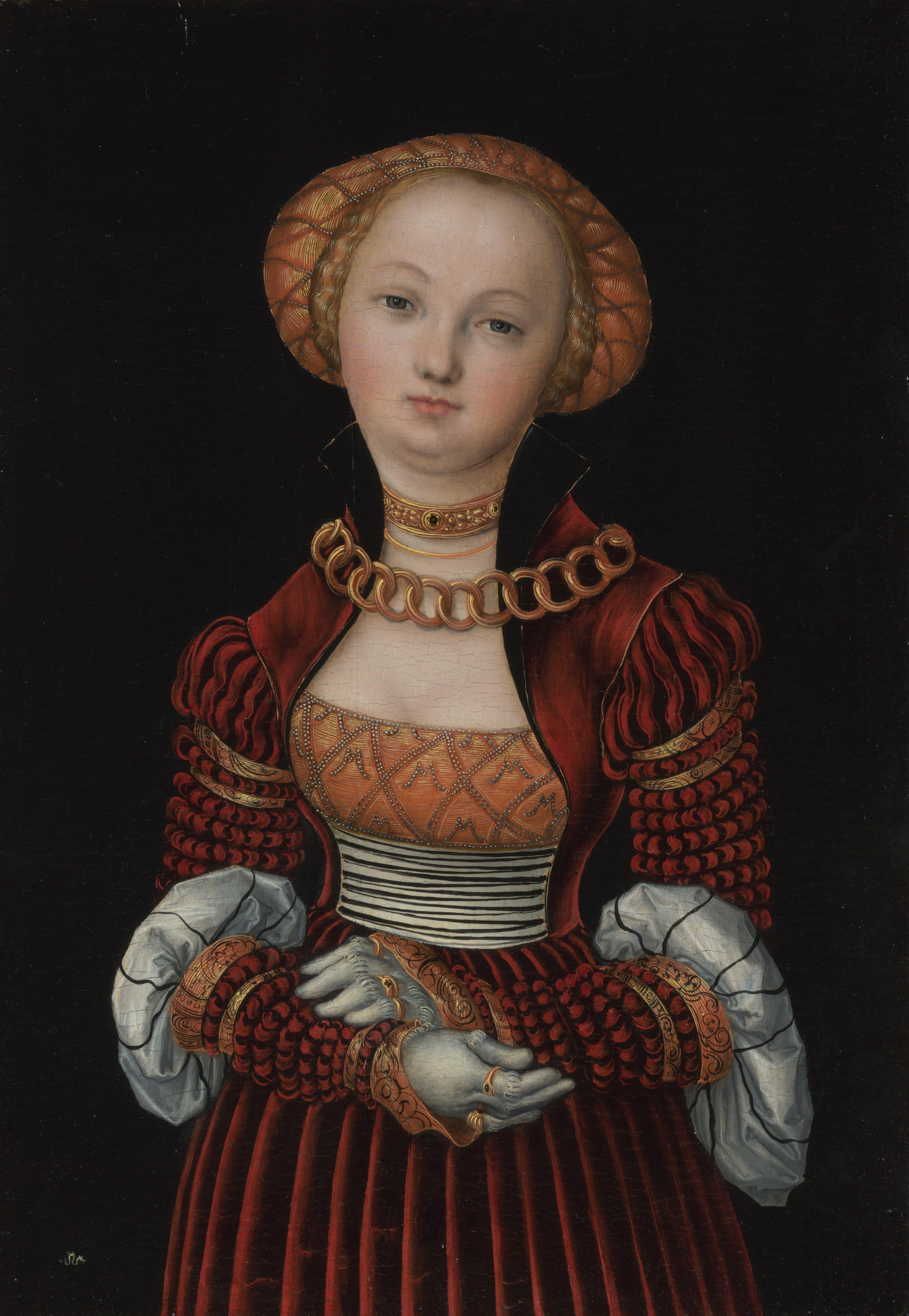
Magdalena of Saxony, first wife of Joachim II Hector

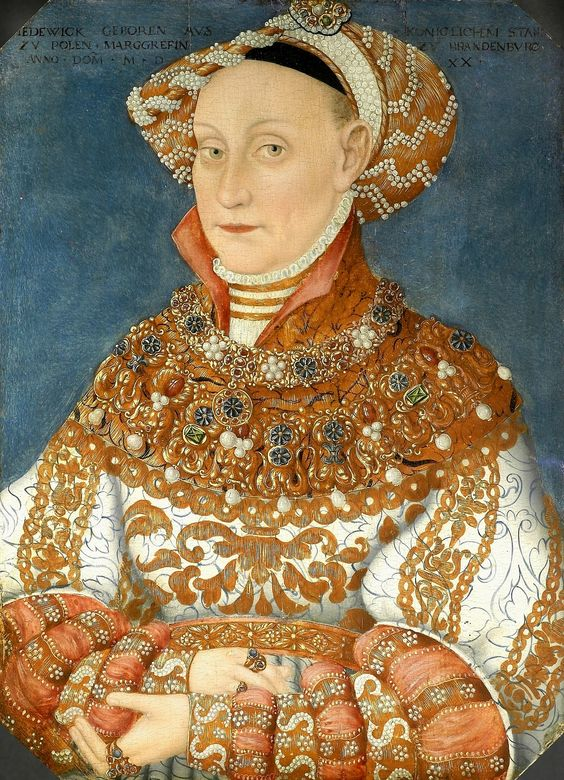
Hedwig of Poland, second wife of Joachim II Hector

With Magdalena of Saxony (1507–1534):

- John George, Elector of Brandenburg (1525–1598), had issue
- Barbara of Brandenburg, Duchess of Brieg (1527–1595), had issue
- Elisabeth (1 April 1528 – 20 August 1529) died in infancy
- Frederick IV of Brandenburg (1530–1552), Archbishop of Magdeburg and Bishop of Halberstadt
- Albrecht (15 February 1532 – 16 February 1532) died in infancy.
- Georg (15 February 1532 – 15 February 1532) died in infancy.
- Paul (4 January 1534 – 4 January 1534) died in infancy.

With Hedwig Jagiellon (1513–1573):

- Elisabeth Magdalena (6 November 1537 – 1 September 1595), married Francis Otto, Duke of Brunswick-Lüneburg,
- Sigismund (1538–1566), Archbishop of Magdeburg and Bishop of Halberstadt
- Hedwig (1540–1602), married Julius, Duke of Brunswick-Lüneburg,
- Sophia (14 December 1541 – 27 June 1564), married William of Rosenberg,
- Joachim (14 January 1543 – 23 March 1544) died in infancy.

== Ancestry ==
Ancestors of Joachim II Hector

8. Albrecht III Achilles, Elector of Brandenburg
4. John Cicero, Elector of Brandenburg
9. Margaret of Baden
2. Joachim I Nestor, Elector of Brandenburg
10. William III, Landgrave of Thuringia
5. Margaret of Thuringia
11. Anne, Duchess of Luxembourg
1. Joachim II Hector, Elector of Brandenburg
12. Christian I, King of Denmark, Norway and Sweden
6. John, King of Denmark, Norway and Sweden
13. Dorothea of Brandenburg
3. Elizabeth of Denmark, Norway and Sweden
14. Ernest, Elector of Saxony
7. Christina of Saxony
15. Elisabeth of Bavaria

Joachim II Hector House of Hohenzollern Born: 1505 Died: 1571
Regnal titles
Preceded by Joachim I Nestor	Elector of Brandenburg; 1535–1571	Succeeded by John George
