= Hedwig Jagiellon, Electress of Brandenburg =

Hedwig Jagiellon
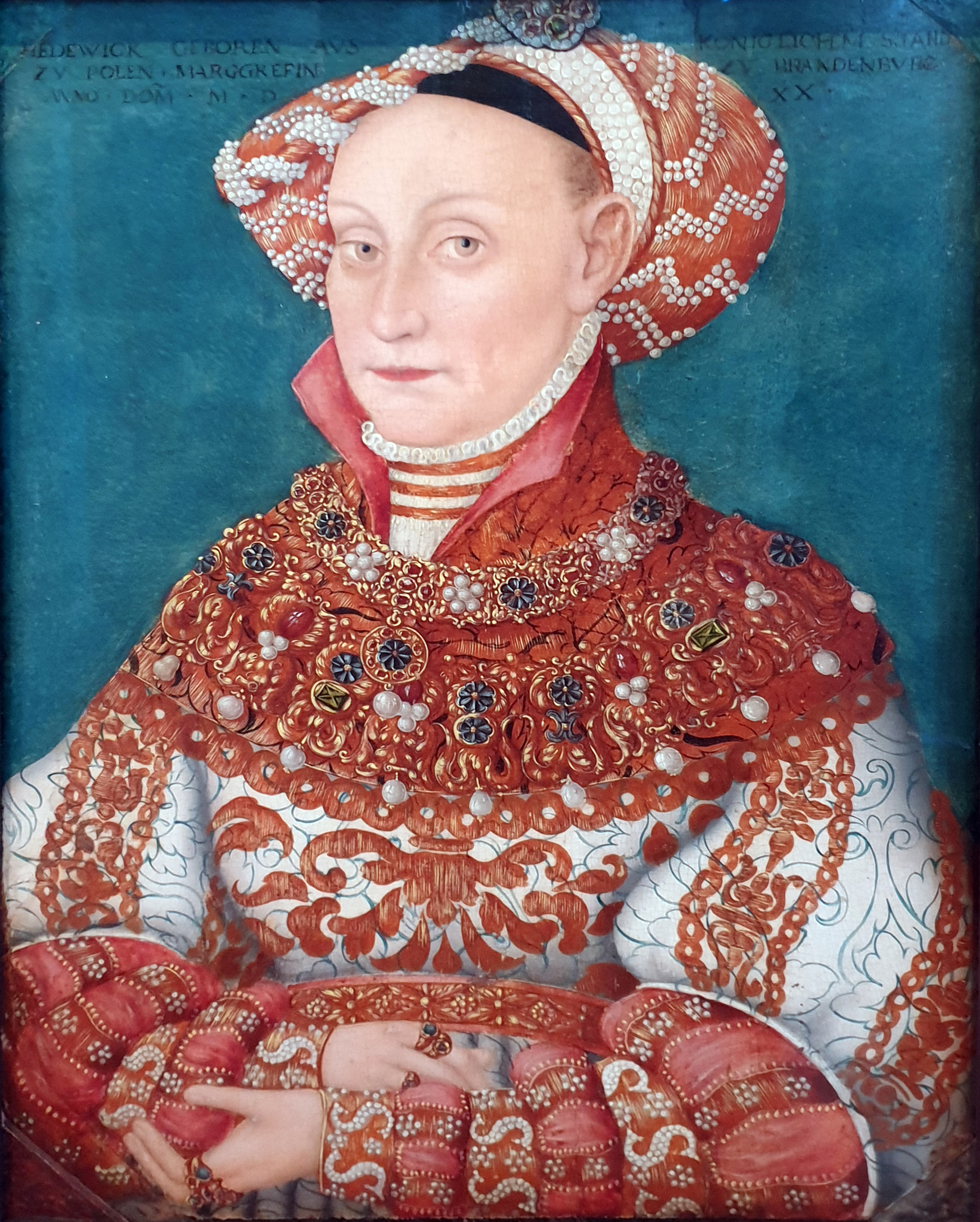
- Portrait by Hans Krell (1537)

Electress consort of Brandenburg
- Tenure: 1535–1571
- Born: 15 March 1513; Poznań, Poland
- Died: 7 February 1573 (aged 59); Neuruppin, Brandenburg
- Burial: Berlin Cathedral (tomb lost, 1750)
- Spouse: Joachim II Hector, Elector of Brandenburg (m. 1535; died 1571)
- Issue more...: Elisabeth Magdalena, Duchess of Brunswick-Lüneburg; Sigismund, Bishop of Magdeburg; Hedwig, Duchess of Brunswick-Lüneburg; Sophia, Countess of Rosenberg
- House: House of Jagiellon (by birth); House of Hohenzollern (by marriage)
- Father: Sigismund I the Old
- Mother: Barbara Zápolya

Hedwig Jagiellon (Polish: Jadwiga Jagiellonka, Lithuanian: Jadvyga Jogailaitė, German: Hedwig Jagiellonica; 15 March 1513 – 7 February 1573) was a princess of the Kingdom of Poland and of the Grand Duchy of Lithuania, and a member of the Jagiellonian dynasty as a daughter of Sigismund I the Old. She was Electress of Brandenburg by marriage to Joachim II Hector, Elector of Brandenburg.

== Early life ==
Hedwig was born on March 15, 1513, in Poznań. She was the eldest daughter of King Sigismund I the Old of Poland and his first wife, Hungarian Countess Barbara Zápolya, sister of the later King John I of Hungary. Her only full sibling, Anna, died at age 5. Her father remarried and had six children with his second wife. Although she grew up with her half brothers and sisters, she had personal tutors, and in the court she received the nickname of "reginula".

Hedwig was described by Olaus Magnus, who met her in 1528, as a "very beautiful, wise maiden [...] finer than all the riches I have just mentioned, and worthy of a glorious realm."

Her hand was first sought by King Gustav I of Sweden, who was determined to make her his first queen. In 1526, Johannes Magnus was sent to Poland by the King of Sweden to negotiate the marriage. Despite the suitor's decision to moderate the religious reforms in his kingdom, Hedwig's father declined Gustav's offer after hearing about Gustav's ill relationship with the Roman Catholic Church, and the opportunity to become Queen of Sweden perished (only to be presented later to Hedwig's half-sister Catherine).

== Electress consort of Brandenburg ==
The next suitor was from Brandenburg. The intensely Catholic Georg von Blumenthal, Bishop of Lebus, was sent to negotiate the marriage. On 29 August or 1 September 1535 Hedwig married Joachim II Hector, Elector of Brandenburg. The wedding was held in Kraków. As the Jagiellon dynasty was Catholic, Joachim II promised Sigismund he would not make Hedwig change her religion and gave her as a dower the county of Ruppin as well as the cities Alt Ruppin and Neuruppin. The marriage contract, signed on 21 March 1535, stipulated that Hedwig would be allowed to bring a Polish priest with her and always be free in the exercise of Catholic prayers.

The marriage did not satisfy Hedwig's mother-in-law, Elizabeth of Denmark, a devout Protestant, for Catholic services were held for Hedwig in her private chapel. The Dowager Electress was also unhappy because Hedwig could not speak German.

After breaking her thigh and hurting her back in the collapse of a floor at a hunting lodge, Hedwig spent the last 22 years of her life crippled. The accident signified the collapse of her marriage, which was already damaged by differences in religion and language. Hedwig was replaced by her husband's mistress, Anna Sydow, whom Joachim treated as his wife and who was recognized publicly.

Hedwig died in Neuruppin on 7 February 1573, two years after her husband.

She is one of the characters on the famous painting by Jan Matejko, Prussian Homage.

== Issue ==
Hedwig and Joachim had six children:

- Elisabeth Magdalena (6 September 1537 – 22 August 1595); married Francis Otto, Duke of Brunswick-Lüneburg
- Sigismund (2 December 1538 – 14 September 1566), Bishop of Magdeburg and Halberstadt.
- Hedwig (2 March 1540 – 21 October 1602); married Julius, Duke of Brunswick-Lüneburg
- Sophia (14 December 1541 – 27 June 1564); married of Wiliam of Rosenberg
- Joachim (1543 – 23 March 1544)
- A daughter; died at birth.

== Ancestry ==
Ancestors of Hedwig Jagiellon, Electress of Brandenburg

8. Władysław II Jagiełło, King of Poland
4. Casimir IV Jagiellon, King of Poland
9. Sophia of Halshany
2. Sigismund I the Old
10. Albert II of Germany
5. Elizabeth of Austria
11. Elizabeth of Luxembourg
1. Hedwig Jagiellon
12. Ladislaus Zápolya
6. Stephen Zápolya
13. Dorothea
3. Barbara Zápolya
14. Przemyslaus II, Duke of Cieszyn
7. Hedwig of Cieszyn
15. Anna of Warsaw

== Sources ==
- Nowakowska, Natalia, ed. (2019). Remembering the Jagiellonians. Routledge. ISBN 978-1-138-56239-4.

Hedwig Jagiellon, Electress of Brandenburg House of Jagiellon Born: March 15 1513 Died: 7 February 1573
German nobility
Vacant Title last held by Elizabeth of Denmark	Electress consort of Brandenburg; August 29/September 1, 1535 – January 3, 1571	Succeeded by Sabina of Brandenburg-Ansbach
