= Elizabeth of Denmark, Electress of Brandenburg =

Electress of Brandenburg from 1502 to 1535

Elizabeth of Denmark
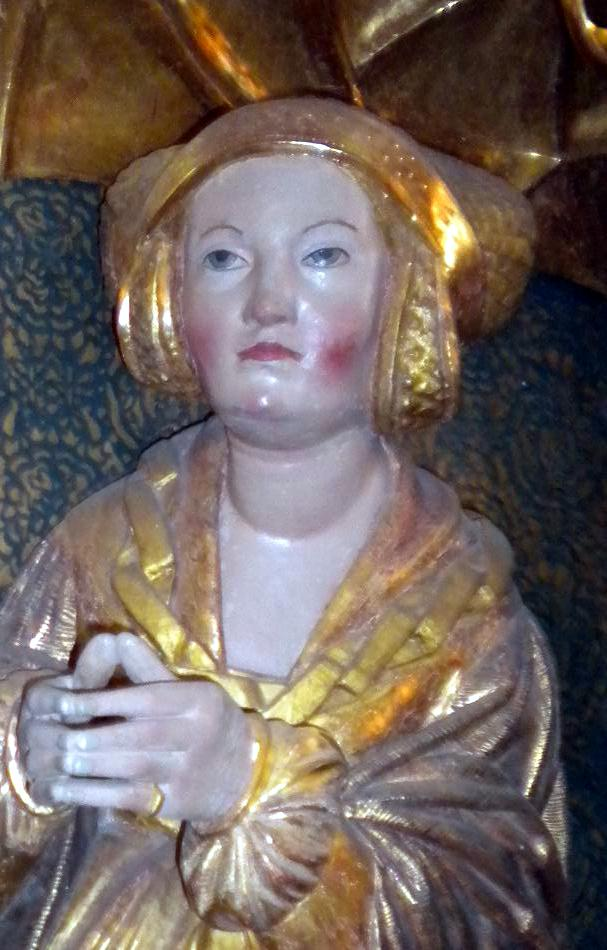
- Sculpture of Elizabeth from the altarpiece by Claus Berg in St. Canute's Cathedral, Odense (c. 1530)

Electress consort of Brandenburg
- Tenure: 10 April 1502 – 11 July 1535
- Born: 24 June 1485; Nyborg Castle
- Died: 10 June 1555 (aged 69); Berlin
- Burial: Berlin Cathedral (tomb lost, 1750)
- Spouse: Joachim I Nestor, Elector of Brandenburg (m. 1502; died 1535)
- Issue: Joachim II Hector, Elector of Brandenburg; Anna, Duchess of Mecklenburg; Elisabeth, Duchess of Brunswick-Calenberg-Göttingen; Margaret, Duchess of Pomerania; John, Margrave of Brandenburg-Küstrin
- House: Oldenburg
- Father: John of Denmark
- Mother: Christina of Saxony

Elizabeth of Denmark, Norway, and Sweden (24 June 1485 – 10 June 1555) was a Danish princess who became Electress of Brandenburg as the wife of Joachim I Nestor, Elector of Brandenburg. She was the daughter of King Hans of Denmark, Norway and Sweden, and Christina of Saxony.

== Biography ==
As a child, Elizabeth was close to her brother, the future Christian II of Denmark. She was able to read and write in both Danish and German. On 10 April 1502 she married Joachim I Nestor, Elector of Brandenburg, in a double wedding alongside her uncle, the future Frederick I of Denmark, and her sister-in-law Anna of Brandenburg. Elizabeth and Joachim got along quite well during the first twenty years of their marriage and co-existed harmoniously. She received her mother in 1507, attended her brother Christian's wedding in 1515 and received Christian in 1523.

Her spouse was a pugnacious adherent of Roman Catholic orthodoxy during the Reformation. In 1523, she attended a sermon of Martin Luther's with her brother and her sister-in-law and became a convinced Protestant. In 1527, she received the Protestant communion in public: this meant a public break with the Catholic Church, and caused a conflict with her husband. In 1528, her husband asked a clerical council from the Catholic Church if he should divorce, execute or isolate her if she refused to renounce her new conviction. The church council replied that he should have her imprisoned.

Elizabeth escaped to the court of her uncle, John, Elector of Saxony, and a public debate broke out: the Protestant monarchs and her brother supported her, Luther supported her freedom to leave her husband for her religion, and she declared that she would return only if she was allowed to keep her convictions and if her husband renounced his adultery and his interest in astrology. Otherwise, she suggested that they separate, referring to the separation of her own parents in 1504. She was given a residence near Wittenberg. Her husband refused to give her an allowance and forbade her sons to visit her. In 1532, her uncle died and her brother was imprisoned, and she thereby lost her supporters.

In 1535, Elizabeth's husband died and her sons asked her to return to Brandenburg, but changed their minds when she made the demand that the parishes in her dowry lands be made Protestant. She finally returned in 1545 and stayed in Spandau.

The marriage of her son Joachim II Hector, Elector of Brandenburg, to Hedwig Jagiellon did not please Elizabeth. Catholic services were held for Hedwig in her private chapel, and the Dowager Electress was also unhappy because Hedwig could not speak German.

== Issue ==
Elizabeth and Joachim had:

1. Joachim II Hector, Elector of Brandenburg
2. Anna (1507–1567), in 1524 married Albert VII, Duke of Mecklenburg-Güstrow,
3. Elisabeth (1510–1558), in 1525 married firstly Eric I of Brunswick-Kalenberg and in 1545 secondly Poppo XII, count of Henneberg,
4. Margaret (1511–1577), in 1530 married firstly George I, Duke of Pomerania and after his death in 1534 secondly John V, Prince of Anhalt-Zerbst,
5. John (1513–1571), Margrave of Brandenburg-Küstrin.

== Ancestry ==
Ancestors of Elizabeth of Denmark, Electress of Brandenburg

8. Dietrich, Count of Oldenburg
4. Christian I of Denmark
9. Hedvig of Holstein
2. John of Denmark
10. John, Margrave of Brandenburg-Kulmbach
5. Dorothea of Brandenburg
11. Barbara of Saxe-Wittenberg
1. Elizabeth of Denmark
12. Frederick II, Elector of Saxony
6. Ernest, Elector of Saxony
13. Margaret of Austria
3. Christina of Saxony
14. Albert III, Duke of Bavaria
7. Elisabeth of Bavaria
15. Anna of Brunswick-Grubenhagen-Einbeck

== Sources ==
- Imsen, Steinar (2007). "The Union of Calmar--Nordic Great Power or Northern German Outpost". In Ocker, Christopher; Printy, Michael; Starenko, Peter; Wallace, Peter (eds.). Politics and Reformations: Communities, Polities, Nations, and Empires. Brill. pp. 471–490. ISBN 978 90 0416173 3.
- Mikkola, Sini; Raisanen-Schroder, Paivi (2022). "Elisabeth von Braunschweig-Luneburg (1510-1558) and Elisabeth of Denmark (1485-1555): Lutheran Rulers". In Stjerna, Kirsi I. (ed.). Women Reformers of Early Modern Europe: Profiles, Texts, and Contexts. Fortress Press. pp. 63–76.
- Chadwick, Owen (2003). The Early Reformation on the Continent. Oxford University Press. ISBN 0-19-926578-X.

Elizabeth of Denmark, Electress of Brandenburg House of Oldenburg Born: 24 June 1485 Died: 10 June 1555
German nobility
Vacant Title last held by Margaret of Thuringia	Electress consort of Brandenburg; 10 April 1502 – 11 July 1535	Vacant Title next held by Hedwig of Poland
