= Neszmély =

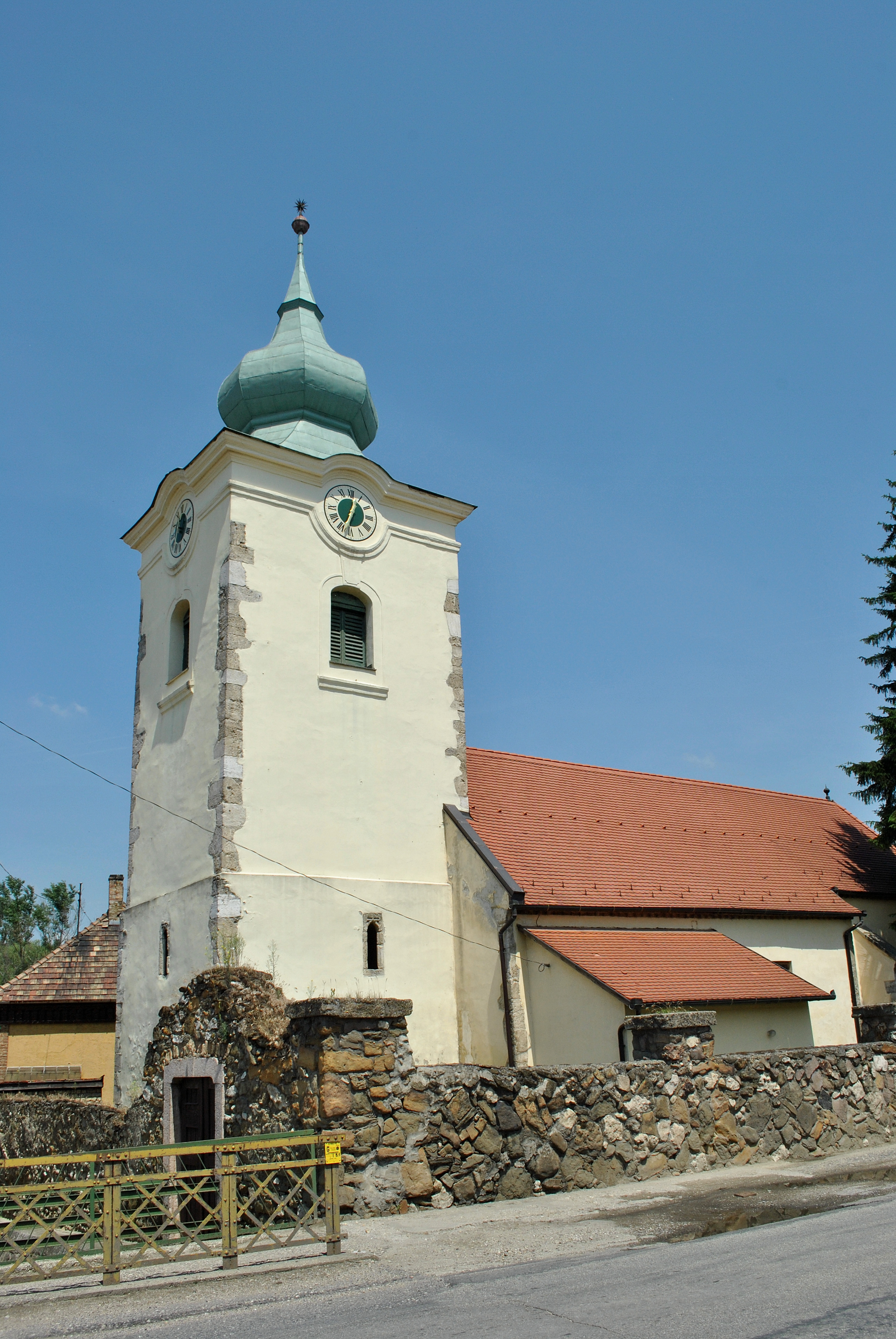

- Location of Komárom-Esztergom county in Hungary

- Location of Neszmély
- Coordinates: 47.73290°N 18.34510°E
- Country: Hungary
- County: Komárom-Esztergom

Area
  - Total: 27.77 km^{2} (10.72 sq mi)

Population (2004)
  - Total: 1,422
  - Density: 51.2/km^{2} (133/sq mi)
- Time zone: UTC+1 (CET)
  - Summer (DST): UTC+2 (CEST)
- Postal code: 2544
- Area code: 34

Neszmély (German: Nessmühl) is a village in Komárom-Esztergom county, Hungary.

Albert the Magnanimous, the first Habsburg King of Hungary and eventual King of the Romans, died in this village.
