= John Cicero, Elector of Brandenburg =

Elector of Brandenburg from 1486 to 1499

John Cicero
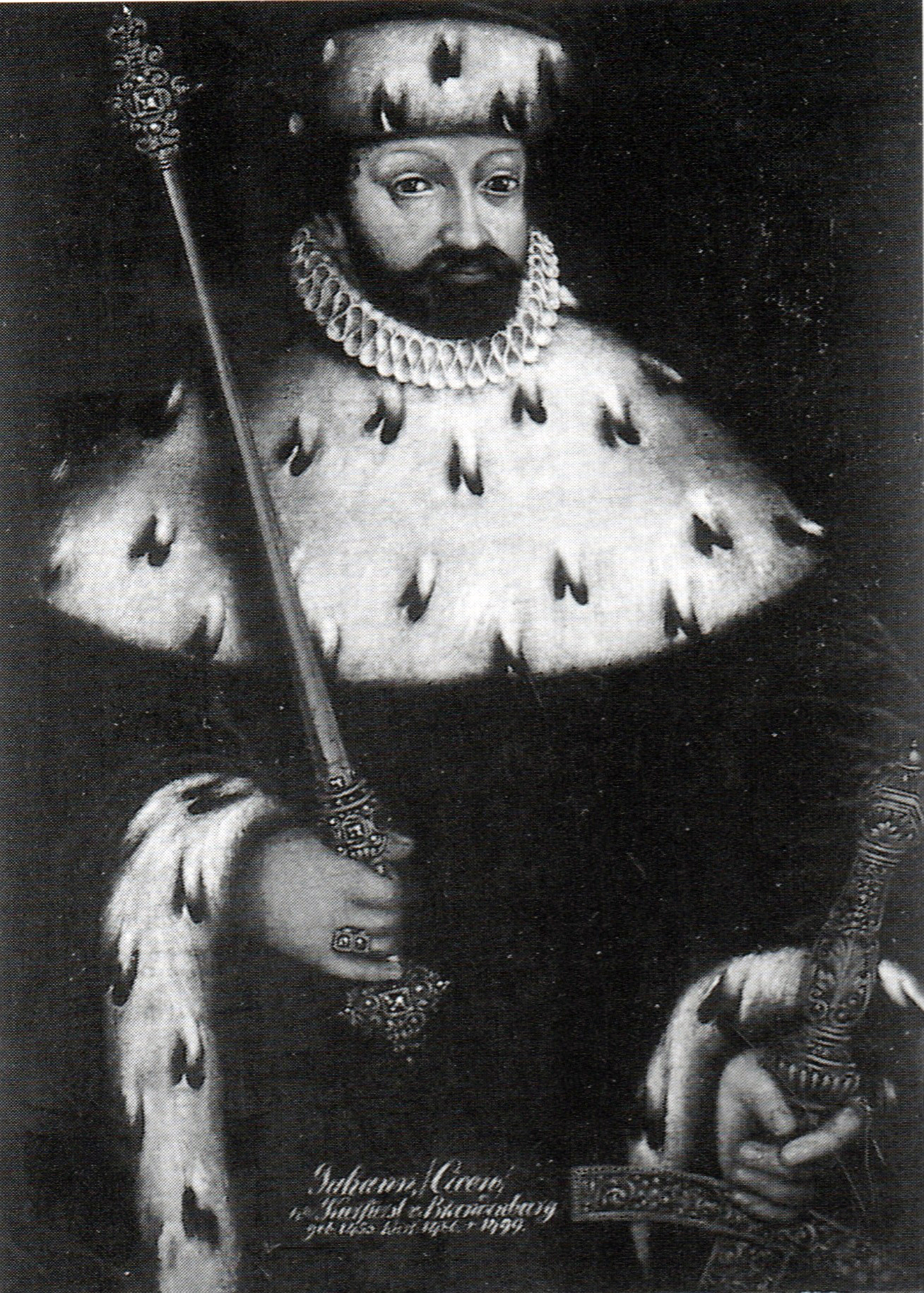

Elector of Brandenburg
- Reign: 11 March 1486 – 9 January 1499
- Predecessor: Albert III Achilles
- Successor: Joachim I Nestor
- Born: 2 August 1455; Ansbach
- Died: 9 January 1499 (aged 43); Arneburg Castle
- Burial: Berlin Cathedral (tomb lost, 1750), originally at Heilsbronn Abbey
- Spouse: Margaret of Thuringia (m. 1476)
- Issue: Joachim I Nestor, Elector of Brandenburg; Albert, Archbishop of Magdeburg and Mainz; Anna, Duchess of Schleswig and Holstein; Ursula, Duchess of Mecklenburg
- House: Hohenzollern
- Father: Albert III Achilles, Elector of Brandenburg
- Mother: Margaret of Baden

John II (German: Johann „Cicero“ von Brandenburg; 2 August 1455 – 9 January 1499) was Elector of Brandenburg from 1486 until his death, the fourth of the House of Hohenzollern. After his death he received the cognomen Cicero, after the Roman orator of the same name, but the elector's eloquence and interest in the arts is debatable.

== Life ==
John Cicero was the eldest son of Elector Albert III Achilles of Brandenburg with his first wife Margaret of Baden. As his father then ruled as Margrave of Brandenburg-Ansbach (from 1457 also as Margrave of Brandenburg-Kulmbach), he was born at the Hohenzollern residence of Ansbach in Franconia, where he spent his childhood years until in 1466 he received the call to Brandenburg as presumed heir by his uncle Elector Frederick II. He joined him in the War of the Succession of Stettin with the Pomeranian dukes, until Frederick resigned in 1470 and was succeeded by John's father, who in 1473 appointed him regent of the Brandenburg lands. After the Pomeranian struggle he also had to deal with the inheritance conflict upon the 1476 death of the Piast duke Henry XI of Głogów, husband of his half-sister Barbara.

On 25 August 1476 in Berlin John married Margaret of Wettin, a daughter of Landgrave William III of Thuringia with Anne, Duchess of Luxembourg. Their children were:

1. Wolfgang, born and died 1482.
2. Joachim I Nestor, Elector of Brandenburg (21 February 1484 – 11 July 1535), Elector of Brandenburg.
3. Elisabeth, born and died 1486.
4. Anna of Brandenburg (27 August 1487, Berlin – 3 May 1514, Kiel), married 10 April 1502 to King Frederick I of Denmark.
5. Ursula of Brandenburg (17 October 1488 – 18 September 1510, Güstrow), married 16 February 1507 to Duke Henry V, Duke of Mecklenburg.
6. Albert of Mainz (1490, Berlin – 24 September 1545, Mainz), Cardinal since 1518, Archbishop of Magdeburg in 1513–45, Archbishop of Mainz in 1514–45.

John succeeded his father as elector in 1486, while the Franconian possessions of the Hohenzollern dynasty passed to his younger brothers Frederick I and Siegmund. He decreed that the Stadtschloss in Berlin, erected at the behest of his uncle Frederick II, should serve as the permanent residence of the Brandenburg electors, the beginning of the city's history as a state capital. He also implemented an excise tax on beer in 1488, which sparked several disturbances, mainly in the towns of the Altmark region.

In 1490 John was able to purchase the former Lusatian territory around Zossen, acknowledged by the Bohemian king Vladislaus II, and maintained the succession claims of the Hohenzollern dynasty to the Pomeranian lands held by the House of Griffins. He died in 1499 from pleural effusion at Arneburg Castle and was succeeded by his eldest son Joachim I. John was the first of the Hohenzollern electors to be buried in Brandenburg, first at Lehnin Abbey, later transferred to Berlin Cathedral by order of his grandson Joachim II.

== Ancestry ==
Ancestors of John Cicero, Elector of Brandenburg

8. Frederick V, Burgrave of Nuremberg
4. Frederick I, Elector of Brandenburg
9. Elisabeth of Meissen
2. Albert III Achilles, Elector of Brandenburg
10. Frederick of Bavaria-Landshut
5. Elisabeth of Bavaria-Landshut
11. Maddalena Visconti
1. John Cicero, Elector of Brandenburg
12. Bernard I, Margrave of Baden-Baden
6. Jacob, Margrave of Baden-Baden
13. Anna of Oettingen
3. Margaret of Baden
14. Charles II, Duke of Lorraine
7. Catherine of Lorraine
15. Margaret of the Palatinate

John Cicero, Elector of Brandenburg House of Hohenzollern Born: 2 August 1455 Died: 9 January 1499
Regnal titles
Preceded by Albert III Achilles	Elector of Brandenburg; 1486–1499	Succeeded by Joachim I Nestor
