= Frederick of Brandenburg (1530–1552) =

Prince-Archbishop of Magdeburg (1530–1552)

- Prince-Archbishop of Magdeburg
- Church: Catholic Church
- Archdiocese: Magdeburg
- Installed: 1551
- Term ended: 2 October 1552
- Predecessor: Johann Albrecht von Brandenburg-Ansbach-Kulmbach
- Successor: Sigismund of Brandenburg
- Other post: Administrator of the Prince-Bishopric of Halberstadt (1552)

Personal details
- Born: 12 December 1530 Berlin, Electorate of Brandenburg, Holy Roman Empire
- Died: 2 October 1552 (aged 21) Halberstadt, Prince-Bishopric of Halberstadt, Holy Roman Empire
- Parents: Joachim II of Brandenburg (father); Magdalena of Saxony (mother)

Frederick of Brandenburg (12 December 1530 – 2 October 1552) was Prince-Archbishop of Magdeburg and Administrator of the Prince-Bishopric of Halberstadt.

== Early life ==
Frederick was born on 12 December 1530 in Berlin.

He was the son of the Elector of Brandenburg, Joachim II (1505–1571), from his first marriage to Magdalena of Saxony (1507–1534), daughter of George, Duke of Saxony.

== Reign ==
After the deposition of Archbishop Johann Albrecht von Brandenburg-Ansbach-Kulmbach after the Schmalkaldic War, Frederick was appointed as new archbishop to prevent the annexation of Magdeburg by Saxony. His appointment was confirmed by the Pope in 1551.

== Death ==
Frederick died the next year on 2 October 1552 in Halberstadt. His splendid household had cost 20.000 Guilders in the 25 weeks he ruled.

First, his death was kept secret, which strengthened the rumors he had been poisoned.

He was succeeded by his half-brother Sigismund of Brandenburg.
