= Sigismund of Brandenburg =

German prince-archbishop and administrator (1538–1566)

- Prince-Archbishop of Magdeburg
- Church: Catholic Church
- Archdiocese: Magdeburg
- Installed: 1552
- Term ended: 13 September 1566
- Predecessor: Frederick of Brandenburg
- Successor: Joachim Frederick of Brandenburg (administrator)
- Other post: Administrator of the Prince-Bishopric of Halberstadt (1552–1566)

Personal details
- Born: 11 December 1538 Cölln, Margraviate of Brandenburg
- Died: 13 September 1566 (aged 27) Moritzburg Castle, Halle upon Saale
- Denomination: Lutheran
- Parents: Joachim II of Brandenburg (father); Hedwig Jagiellon (mother)

Sigismund of Brandenburg (11 December 1538 – 13 September 1566) was Prince-Archbishop of Magdeburg and Administrator of the Prince-Bishopric of Halberstadt.

== Early life ==
Sigismund was born on 11 December 1538 in Cölln; the son of the Elector of Brandenburg, Joachim II (1505–1571), from his second marriage to Hedwig (1513–1572), daughter of King Sigismund I of Poland and the Hungarian Countess Barbara Zápolya. Sigismund owed not only his name but also a close resemblance to his grandfather.

== Succession and career ==
Sigismund succeeded his elder brother, Frederick, in 1552 as prince-archbishop of Magdeburg and diocesan administrator of the Prince-Bishopric of Halberstadt. The administration of the Halberstadt see had been combined with the Magdeburg see since 1480. Because he was only 14 it was initially suggested that the Magdeburg Cathedral chapter could not elect him, so he was postulated. Until 1557, when he came of age, Count John George of Mansfeld was installed by the cathedral chapter to run the prince-archbishopric. On 21 January 1553 the young prince-archbishop, who had meanwhile been confirmed by Pope Julius III although he was Lutheran, was rendered homage by the nobility in Halle upon Saale. In the early years of the new schism the Holy See was not always aware who was seriously Lutheran, and still hoped the schism would abate again. Although Lutheran, Sigismund remained unmarried. In 1567 the remainder of the cathedral chapter converted to Lutheranism.

In 1555 Sigismund issued a code of procedure. Three years later, Emperor Ferdinand I granted the prince-archbishop the privilegium de non appellando. From 1552 to 1553 Sigismund had a new residence, the Peterhof, built in Halberstadt.

== Death ==
He died on 13 September 1566 at the Moritzburg Castle in Halle upon Saale. His death at age 28 prevented him being a serious candidate for the Polish throne and hindered the introduction of Reformation to the whole archdiocese.

== Sources ==
- Hoffmann, Friedrich W. (1847). Geschichte der Stadt Magdeburg, Baensch, p. 316 ff.
- Karl Janicke (1892). "Sigmund" . Allgemeine Deutsche Biographie (in German). Vol. 34. Leipzig: Duncker & Humblot. pp. 294–297.
- Pauli, Karl Friedrich (1762). Allgemeine preussische Staatsgeschichte, C. P. Francken, p. 194

Sigismund of Brandenburg House of Hohenzollern Born: 11 December 1538 in Cölln Died: 13 September 1566 in Halle upon Saale
Catholic Church titles
Regnal titles
Preceded by Frederick of Brandenburg as Frederick IV in Magdeburg, Frederick III in Halberstadt	Prince-Archbishop of Magdeburg; 1552–1566	Succeeded by Joachim Frederick of Brandenburg as Administrator
Preceded by Frederick of Brandenburg as Frederick IV in Magdeburg, Frederick III in Halberstadt	Administrator of the Prince-Bishopric of Halberstadt; 1552–1566	Succeeded by Henry Julius of Brunswick and Lunenburg as Administrator
