= Vieska, Dunajská Streda District =

Vieska Dunakisfalud
- Municipality
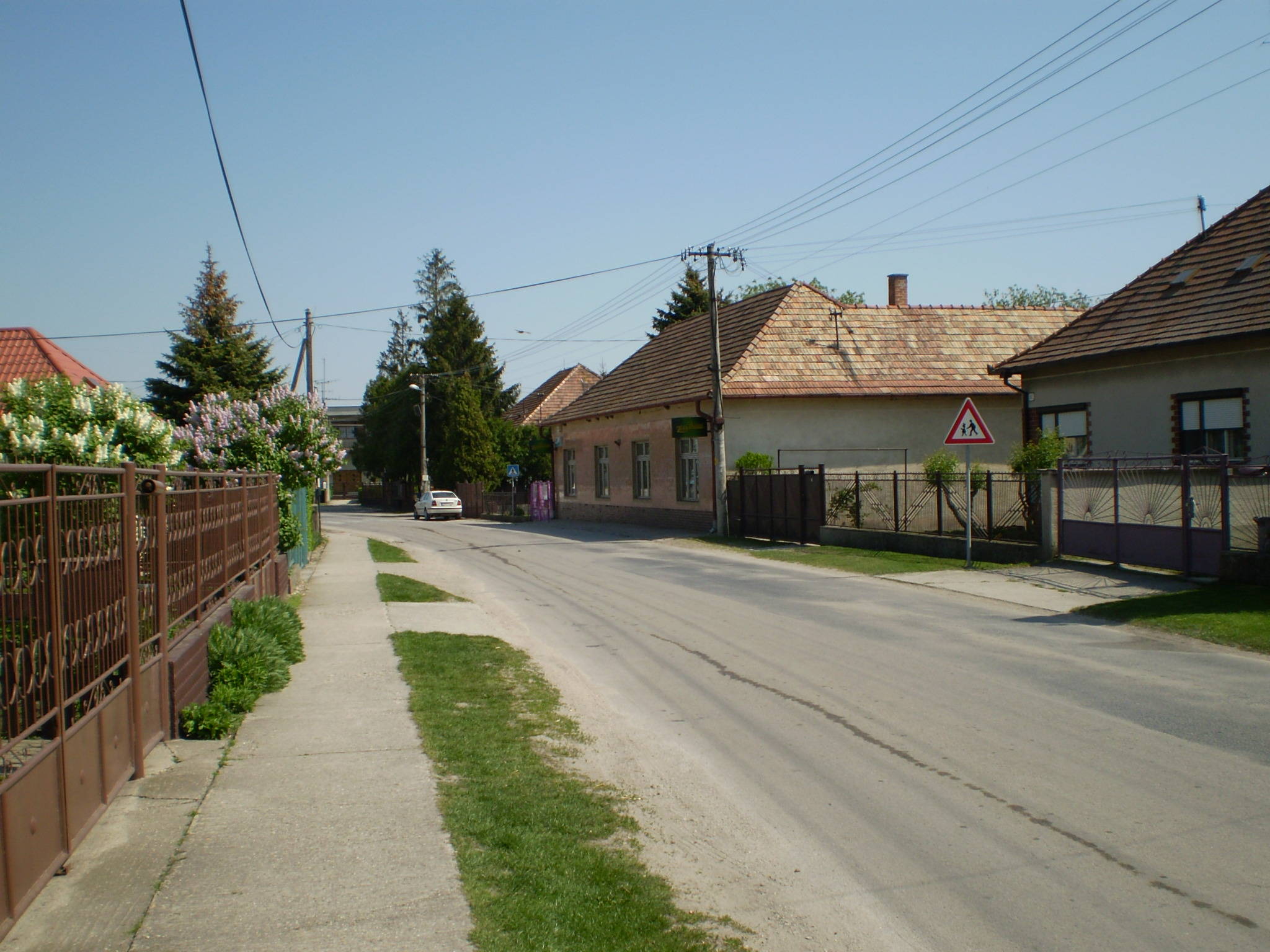

- Flag

- Location of Vieska in the Trnava Region Location of Vieska in Slovakia
- Coordinates: 48°00′10″N 17°31′41″E
- Country: Slovakia
- Region: Trnava Region
- District: Dunajská Streda District
- First mentioned: 1322

Area
  - Total: 3.95 km^{2} (1.53 sq mi)
- Elevation: 118 m (387 ft)

Population (2025)
  - Total: 424

Ethnicity
- Time zone: UTC+1 (CET)
  - Summer (DST): UTC+2 (CEST)
- Postal code: 930 02
- Area code: +421 31
- Vehicle registration plate (until 2022): DS
- Website: www.obecvieska.sk

Vieska (Hungarian: Dunakisfalud, pronounced [ˈdunɒkiʃfɒlud], lit. 'Small Village on Danube') is a village and municipality in the Dunajská Streda District in the Trnava Region of south-west Slovakia.

== History ==
The village was first recorded in 1322. Until the end of World War I, it was part of Hungary and fell within the Dunaszerdahely district of Pozsony County. After the Austro-Hungarian army disintegrated in November 1918, Czechoslovak troops occupied the area. After the Treaty of Trianon of 1920, the village became officially part of Czechoslovakia. In November 1938, the First Vienna Award granted the area to Hungary and it was held by Hungary until 1945. The present-day municipality was formed in 1940 by unifying the three component villages. After Soviet occupation in 1945, Czechoslovak administration returned and the village became officially part of Czechoslovakia in 1947.

== Population ==
Population statistic (10 years)
Year	1995	2005	2015	2025
Count	448	442	419	424
Difference		−1.33%	−5.20%	+1.19%

Population statistic
Year	2024	2025
Count	423	424
Difference		+0.23%

It has a population of 424 people (31 December 2025).

In 1910, the village had 345, for the most part, Hungarian inhabitants.

=== Ethnicity ===
Census 2021 (1+ %)
Ethnicity	Number	Fraction
Hungarian	314	77.14%
Slovak	82	20.14%
Not found out	14	3.43%
Total	407	

In year 2021 was 407 people by ethnicity 314 as Hungarian, 82 as Slovak, 14 as Not found out, 4 as Czech, 2 as Polish and 1 as Other.

Note on population: The difference values of population numbers in the table "Population statistic" and in the sections "Ethnicity" & "Religion" is caused by the use of various statistical methods.

=== Religion ===
Census 2021 (1+ %)
Religion	Number	Fraction
Roman Catholic Church	290	71.25%
None	82	20.15%
Calvinist Church	17	4.18%
Not found out	11	2.7%
Total	407	

In year 2021 was 407 people by religion 290 from Roman Catholic Church, 82 from None, 17 from Calvinist Church, 11 from Not found out, 2 from Greek Catholic Church, 1 from Eastern Orthodox Church, 1 from Christian Congregations in Slovakia, 1 from Islam, 1 from Evangelical Church and 1 from Apostolic Church.

== Geography ==
The village is situated in the south-west of the country on the Žitný ostrov (Hungarian: Csallóköz) near the town of Dunajská Streda. It lies between Bratislava, Slovakia's capital, and Komárno.

Most houses in the village are one story homes with several generations living together. In the past, up to the mid-20th century, the inhabitants were farmers and lived from their gardens. However, during the Communist period, people worked in the local state-owned agricultural cooperative (called "JRD" in Czechoslovakia at that time). Today, many of the young people go abroad to find jobs missing in the village.

The village has a soccer team, which plays on the playground in the middle of the village. The team plays in the 5th south-west league, and competes with the neighbouring village of Orechová Potôň (Hungarian: Dióspatony). On many occasions, five hundred fans attend these matches.
