= Thomas Ebendorfer =

Austrian historian (1388–1464)

Thomas Ebendorfer (10 August 1388 – 12 January 1464) was an Austrian historian, professor, and statesman.

Born at Haselbach, in Lower Austria, he studied at the University of Vienna, where he received the degree of Master of Arts in 1412. Until 1427 he was attached to the Faculty of Arts and lectured on Aristotle and Latin grammar. After 1419 he was also admitted to the theological faculty as 'cursor biblicus'. In 1427 he was made licentiate and in 1428 Master of Theology; soon after he became dean of the theological faculty, in which body he was a professor until his death.

He was rector of the University of Vienna in 1423, 1429, and 1445; and he was also a canon of St. Stephen's church, and engaged in the apostolic ministry as a preacher and as pastor of Perchtoldsdorf and of Falkenstein near Vienna.

He ranks high among the professors of the University of Vienna in the fifteenth century. In the struggles which it had to sustain, he championed the rights and interests of the university with zeal and energy.

He represented the university at the Council of Basle (1432–1434), took an active part in all its discussions, and was one of the delegates sent by the council to Prague to confer with the Hussites.

From 1440 to 1444 he was sent to various cities as an ambassador of Emperor Frederick III. He disapproved of the attitude of the Council of Basle towards both pope and emperor, and eventually withdrew from it.

His advocacy of the rights of the Vienna University, coupled with the attacks of his opponents, lost him the favour of the emperor, who saw in him a secret enemy.

In 1451 and 1452 he was in Italy and went to Rome where he obtained from the pope a confirmation of the privileges of the University of Vienna.

In the war between Frederick III and Albert of Brandenburg he tried to act as mediator but only fell into greater disfavour with Frederick.

His last years were clouded by the disturbances of the years 1461–1463 during which Austria had much to suffer from the King of Bohemia, George of Podebrady, and from internal conflicts.

== Historical and Religious Works ==
Ebendorfer is one of the most prominent chroniclers of the Fifteenth century. His "Chronicon Austriae" is a dull but frank and very detailed history of Austria to 1463. From 1400 on it is an indispensable source of Austrian history (ed. Pez in "Scriptores rerum Austriacarum", II, Leipzig, 1725, 689-986; in this edition all of Book I and part of Book II were omitted).

His account of the Council of Basle appears in the "Diarium gestorum concilii Basileensis pro reductione Bohemorum" (ed. Birk in Monumenta concilii Basileensis, Scriptores, I, Vienna, 1875, 701-783).

He wrote also a history of the Roman emperors, "Chronica regum Romanorum"; Books VI and VII, which are of independent value as sources, were edited by Pribram in the Mitteilungen des Instituts für österreichische Geschichtsforschung, third supplementary volume (Innsbruck, 1890-1894), 38-222.

Many of his writings are as yet unedited, among them commentaries on Biblical books, sermons, "Liber de schismatibus", "Liber Pontificum Romanorum" (see Levinson, "Thomas Ebendorfers Liber Pontificum" in "Mitteilungen des Instituts fur osterreichische Geschichtsforschung", XX, 1899, 69-99). 'Sermones Dominicales', printed in Strasbourg in 1478.
