= Margaret of Thuringia =

Electress consort of Brandenburg from 1486 to 1499

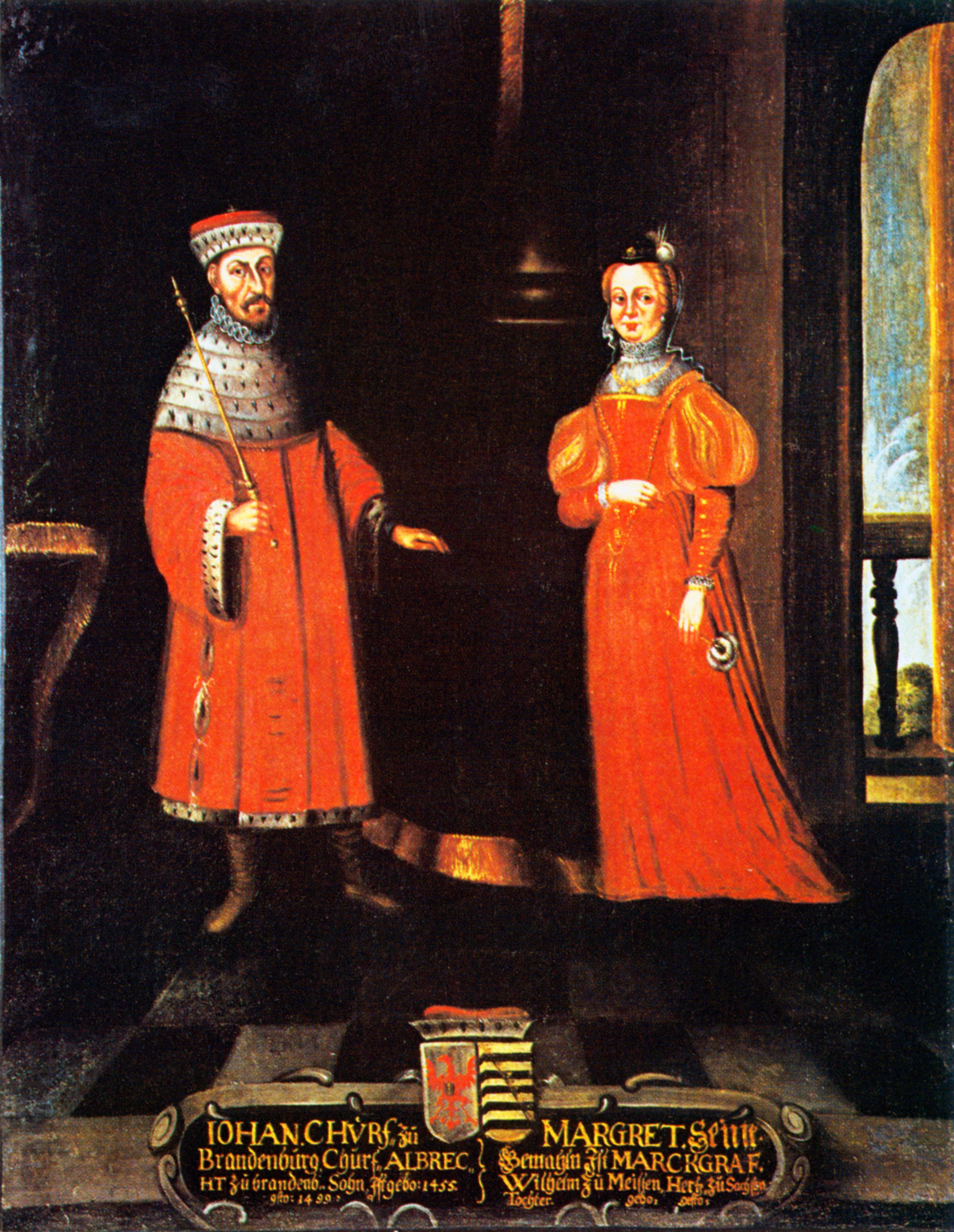
- Margaret of Thuringia with her husband, John Cicero, Elector of Brandenburg

Electress consort of Brandenburg
- Tenure: 11 March 1486 – 9 January 1499
- Born: 1449; Weimar
- Died: 13 July 1501; Spandau
- Burial: Berlin Cathedral (tomb lost, 1750)
- Spouse: John Cicero, Elector of Brandenburg (m. 1476; died 1499)
- Issue: Joachim I Nestor, Elector of Brandenburg; Albert, Archbishop of Magdeburg and Mainz; Anna of Brandenburg; Ursula, Duchess of Mecklenburg
- House: Wettin
- Father: William III, Landgrave of Thuringia
- Mother: Anne of Austria, suo jure Duchess of Luxembourg

Margaret of Thuringia or Margaret of Saxony (1449 – 13 July 1501) was a German noblewoman, Electress of Brandenburg by marriage.

She was the daughter of William III, Landgrave of Thuringia and Anne of Austria, Duchess of Luxembourg suo jure.

== Family and children ==
On 15 August 1476, in Berlin, she married John Cicero, Elector of Brandenburg. They had the following children:

1. Wolfgang, born and died 1482.
2. Joachim I Nestor (21 February 1484–11 July 1535), Elector Brandenburg.
3. Elisabeth, born and died 1486.
4. Albert (1490, Berlin–24 September 1545, Mainz), Cardinal since 1518, Archbishop of Magdeburg in 1513-14, Archbishop of Mainz in 1514-45.
5. Anna (27 August 1487, Berlin–3 May 1514, Kiel), married 10 April 1502 to the future King Frederick I of Denmark (she was never queen consort, since she died before her husband's accession).
6. Ursula (17 October 1488–18 September 1510, Güstrow), married 16 February 1507 to Henry V, Duke of Mecklenburg.

Margaret of Thuringia House of Wettin Born: 1449 Died: 13 July 1501
German nobility
Preceded by Anna of Saxony	Electress consort of Brandenburg; 11 March 1486 – 9 January 1499	Vacant Title next held by Elizabeth of Denmark
