= Albert II of Germany =

King of Hungary, Germany, and Bohemia (1397–1439)

Albert II
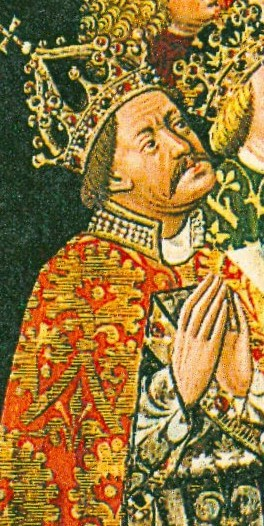
- Portrait in Klosterneuburg Abbey, c. 1438

Duke of Austria
- Reign: 14 September 1404 – 27 October 1439
- Predecessor: Albert IV
- Successor: Ladislaus the Posthumous

King of Hungary and Croatia
- Reign: 18 December 1437 – 27 October 1439
- Coronation: 1 January 1438, Székesfehérvár
- Predecessor: Sigismund
- Successor: Vladislaus I

King of the Romans
- Reign: 17 March 1438 – 27 October 1439
- Predecessor: Sigismund
- Successor: Frederick III

King of Bohemia
- Reign: 6 May 1438 – 27 October 1439
- Coronation: 29 June 1438, Prague
- Predecessor: Sigismund
- Successor: Ladislaus the Posthumous
- Born: 10 August 1397; Vienna, Duchy of Austria
- Died: 27 October 1439 (aged 42); Neszmély, Kingdom of Hungary
- Burial: Székesfehérvár
- Spouse: Elizabeth of Luxembourg (m. 1422)
- Issue: Anne, Duchess of Luxembourg; Elisabeth, Queen of Poland; Ladislaus the Posthumous
- House: Habsburg
- Father: Albert IV, Duke of Austria
- Mother: Joanna Sophia of Bavaria

Albert II (German: Albrecht II., 10 August 1397 – 27 October 1439) was King of the Romans and a member of the House of Habsburg. By inheritance he became Albert V, Duke of Austria. Through his wife Elizabeth of Luxembourg (jure uxoris), he also became King of Hungary, King of Croatia, King of Bohemia, and inherited a claim to the Duchy of Luxembourg.

He played a significant role in the Hussite Wars, assisting his father-in-law Sigismund and suffering defeats like the Battle of Domažlice in 1431. Crowned King of Hungary in 1438, he struggled to control Bohemia and fought against Polish-Bohemian forces. He later became King of the Romans but died in 1439 while defending Hungary from the Ottomans. His reign saw anti-Hussite and anti-Jewish persecutions, continuing medieval crusades against perceived heretics. Austrian Jews faced increased taxation and expulsions, culminating in the 1420 Vienna pogrom, partly driven by accusations of aiding the Hussites.

== Biography ==
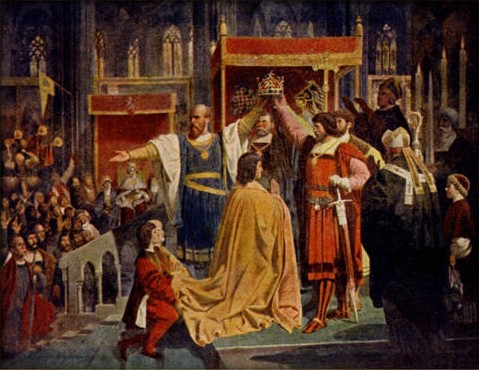
Coronation of Albert II in 1438 as King of Bohemia, by Karel Svoboda, 1848–1856

Albert was born in Vienna as the son of Albert IV, Duke of Austria, and Joanna Sophia of Bavaria.

He succeeded to the Duchy of Austria at the age of seven on his father's death in 1404. His uncle Duke William of Inner Austria, then head of the rivaling Leopoldinian line, served as regent for his nephew, followed by his brothers Leopold IV and Ernest the Iron in 1406. The quarrels between the brothers and their continued attempts to gain control over the Albertinian territories led to civil war-like conditions. Nevertheless, Albert, having received a good education, undertook the government of Austria proper on the occasion of Leopold's death in 1411 and succeeded, with the aid of his advisers, in ridding the duchy of the evils which had arisen during his minority.

In 1422 Albert married Elisabeth of Luxemburg, the daughter and heiress of the King Sigismund of Hungary (later also Holy Roman Emperor and King of Bohemia), and his second wife, the Slovenian noblewoman Barbara of Celje. Besides Hungary, Albert's marriage brought him claims to numerous Slavic kingdoms and principalities and other realms of Central and Eastern Europe as well.

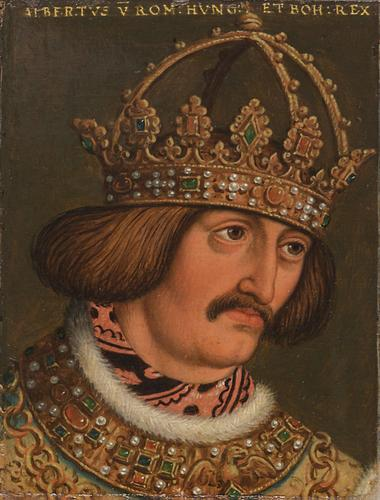
Albert II as Roman-German king

Albert assisted his father-in-law Sigismund in his campaigns against the Hussites, involving the Austrian duchy in the Hussite Wars. In return Sigismund designated him as his successor and granted him the title of Margrave of Moravia in 1423. The Austrian lands were devastated several times and Albert also participated in the 1431 Battle of Domažlice where the Imperial troops suffered an embarrassing defeat. While his lands were harmed it was a show of loyalty to the church as the church was trying to consolidate its influence and power.

When Sigismund died in 1437, Albert was crowned king of Hungary on 1 January 1438, and just as his predecessor did, he moved his court to the Hungarian Kingdom from where he later oversaw his other domains. Although crowned king of Bohemia six months after ascending to the Hungarian throne, he was unable to obtain possession of the country. He was engaged in warfare with the Bohemians and their Polish allies, when on 17 March 1438, he was elected as "King of the Romans" at Frankfurt. Albert was never crowned as Holy Roman Emperor.

Afterwards engaged in defending Hungary against the attacks of the Turks, he died on 27 October 1439 at Neszmély and was buried at Székesfehérvár. Albert was an energetic and warlike prince, whose short reign as a triple king gave great promise of usefulness for the Holy Roman Empire.

== Hussite Wars and persecution ==
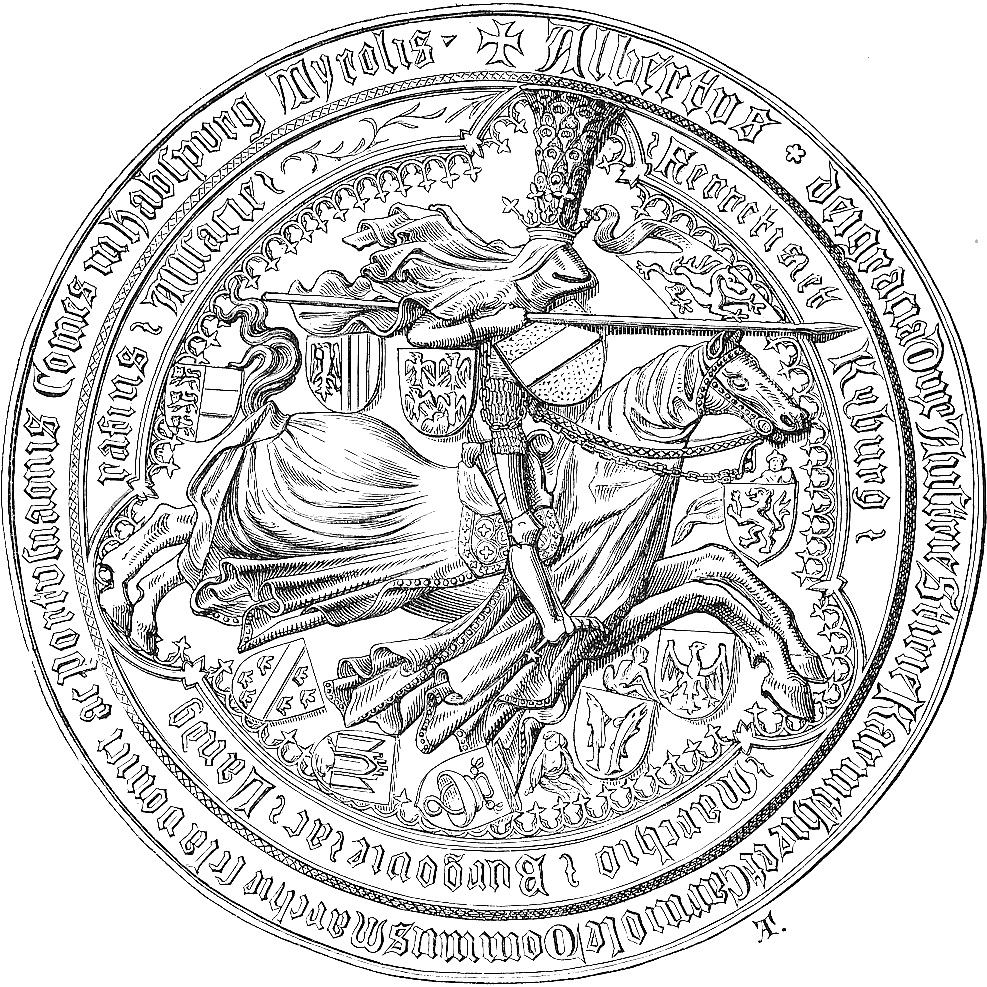
Albert's seal

Beginning with the First Crusade in the year 1095, those who were not adherents to the Catholic faith were deemed by the religious authorities to be heretics, and were to be persecuted, destroyed or converted. While the papal call for violence against non-Christians applied to Muslims originally, it was applied against other religious and social groups. Jews and lepers were the main targets along with Muslims in the crusade to destroy "devilry." The persecution of Jews came as no surprise in connection with the Hussite Wars. The call to arms against heretics meant the call to arms against all who are not Christian, with the hopes of their destruction or conversion. If the heretics did not convert to Christianity they were massacred, usually burned.

== Jewish persecution ==
Beginning in the 11th century, Jews began to migrate from rural areas to the cities of Western Europe, where they came to assume an important economic role in commercial activity and especially as moneylenders. This economic transformation was accompanied by a deterioration of relations between Jewish and Christian populations, with an increase of violent persecutions (Pogrom) by the latter towards the former. The first major instance of Jewish persecution coincided with the call of the First Crusade in the fall of 1095. Summoned by Pope Urban II with the aim of conquering the Holy Land, crusaders interpreted the papal call to use violence against non Christians as a command to attack and destroy Jewish communities in France and the Rhineland. These German-Austrian massacres were arguably a great influence on Albert V and his Jewish persecutions and expulsions.

Though the Jews in the Austrian duchy had been subject to local persecutions during the 13th and 14th century, their position remained relatively safe. Jewish communities prospered in several towns like Krems or the area around the Judenplatz at Vienna. During the confusion after the death of Duke Albert IV in 1404 their situation worsened sharply, culminating in the blaze of the Vienna synagogue on 5 November 1406, followed by riots and lootings.

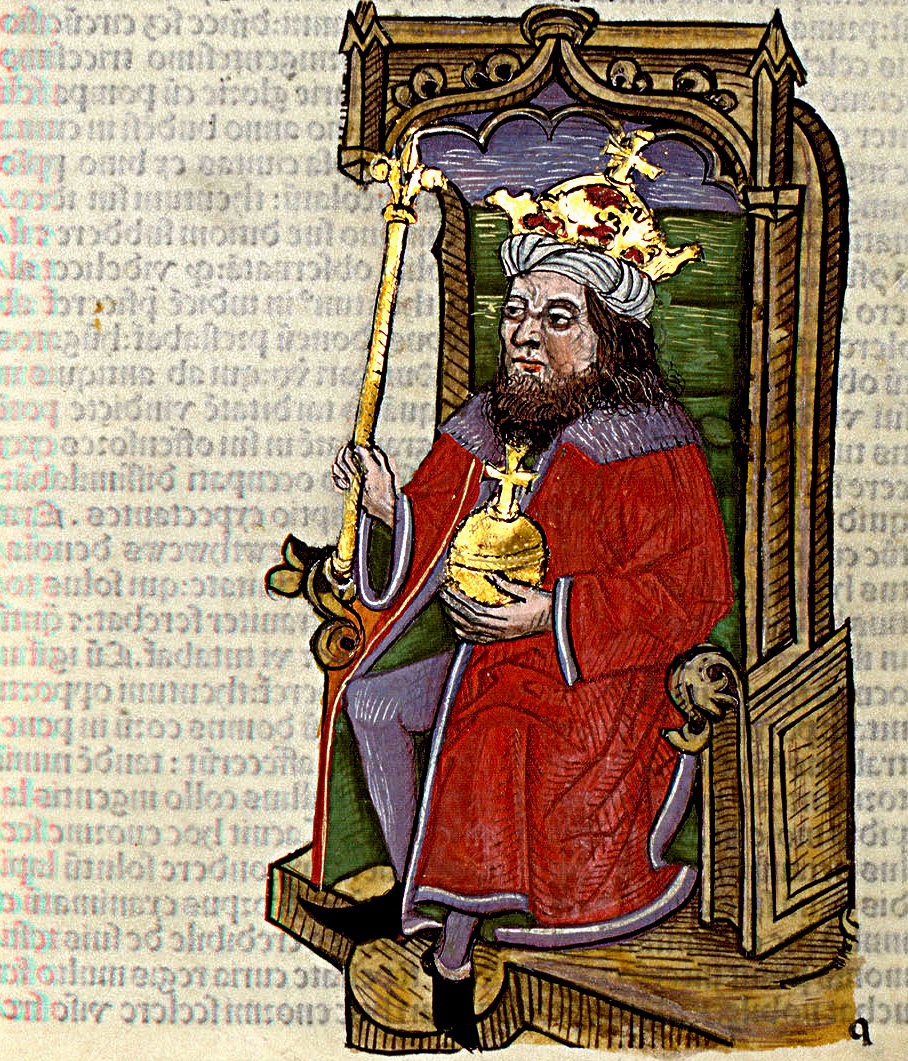
King Albert of Hungary as depicted in the Chronica Hungarorum

With the ordering of campaign preparations against the Hussites by King Sigismund in the beginning of the 15th century, taxes were used to fund a crusade army. Albert V of Austria followed suit, keeping his good standing with the Catholic Church while he was in power. When Albert V came of age in 1411 and interfered in the Hussite Wars, he repeatedly established new taxes on the Jewish community to finance his campaigns, to destroy "devilry" and "imprudence". Like the Hussites, Jews were seen as an enemy to Christendom. After the Hussites had devastated the duchy, the Austrian Jews were accused of collaboration and arms trade in favor of the enemies. The accusations of a host desecration at Enns in 1420 gave Albert pretext for the destruction of the Jewish community.

According to the 1463 Chronica Austriae by chronicler Thomas Ebendorfer, the duke on 23 May 1420, at the behest of the Church, ordered the imprisonment and forcible conversion of the Jews. Those that had not converted or escaped were sent off in boats down the Danube, while wealthy Jews remained under arrest, several of them tortured and stripped of their property. The forced baptism of Jewish children was stopped on intervention by Pope Martin V. On 12 March 1421 Albert sentenced the remaining Jews to death. Ninety-two men and 120 women were burned at the stake south of the Vienna city walls on 12 March 1421. The Jews were placed under an "eternal ban" and their synagogue was demolished. The persecutions in several Austrian towns are explicitly described in a 16th-century script called Vienna Gesera.

== Title and names ==
Coat of arms Albert II of Habsburg

In Early New High German his titles are Albrecht von Gots Gnaden Römischer Kunig zu allen Zeiten Merer des Reichs, und zu Hungern, Dalmacien, Croacien ic. Kunig, Erwelter Kunig zu Behem, Herzog zu Oesterreich u. Marggraf zu Mern (Albert, by the Grace of God, King of the Romans, ever-increaser [August] of the Reich, of Germany, of Hungary, Dalmatia, Croatia, etc. etc., King; Elected King of Bohemia, Duke of Austria and Margrave of Moravia, etc. etc.).

In English he is sometimes known as Albert the Grave or Albert the Magnanimous; this is possibly due to a confusion with the 16th-century ruler Albert V, Duke of Bavaria, who is called the Magnanimous (der Großmütige) in German.

== Family ==
His children with Elizabeth of Luxembourg were:

- Anne of Austria (1432–1462), who married William III, Duke of Saxony. William became (1457–69) Duke of Luxembourg, in right of his wife
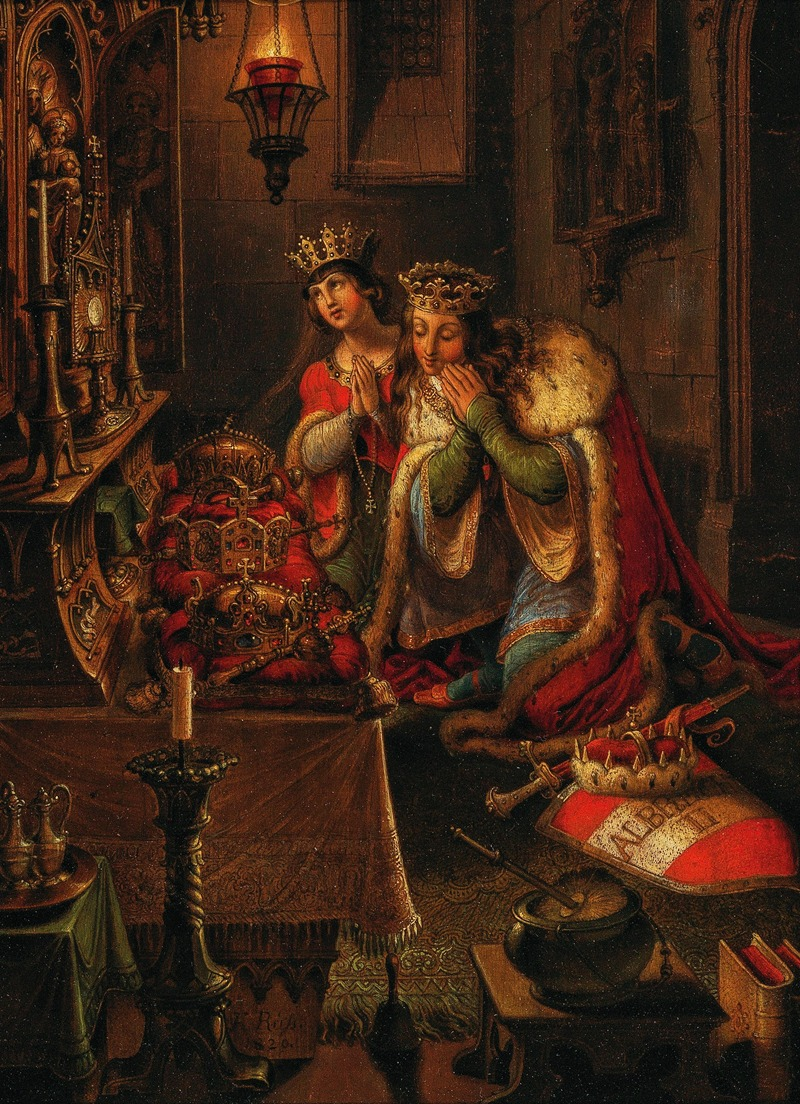
- King Albert II and His Wife Elizabeth of Luxembourg in Prayer, on the Altar the Crowns of Bohemia and Hungary, as well as the Imperial Crown of the Holy Roman Empire (1820) by Karl Russ
  Elisabeth (c. 1436–1439 to 1505), who married Casimir IV of Poland, and whose son Vladislaus II of Bohemia later became king of Bohemia and Hungary
- George (born and died at Vienna on 16 February 1435)
- Ladislas V Posthumus of Bohemia, King of Hungary and Bohemia

== Male-line family tree ==
House of Habsburg

Original line
Albert; Count of Habsburg c. 1188–1239
Rudolf I of Germany c. 1218–1291
Albert I of Germany; 1255–1308	Hartmann; 1263–1281	Rudolf II; Duke of Austria; 1270–1290
Rudolf I of Bohemia; 1281–1307	Frederick the Fair c. 1289–1330	Leopold I Duke of Austria; 1290–1326	Albert II; Duke of Austria; 1298–1358	Henry the Friendly; 1299–1327	Otto; Duke of Austria; 1301–1339	John; Parricida c. 1290–1312/1313
Albertinian line	Leopoldian line
Rudolf IV; Duke of Austria; 1339–1365	Frederick III; 1347–1362	Albert III; Duke of Austria; 1349–1395	Leopold III; Duke of Austria; 1351–1386	Frederick II; Duke of Austria; 1327–1344	Leopold II; Duke of Austria; 1328–1344
Albert IV; Duke of Austria; 1377–1404	William; Duke of Austria c. 1370–1406	Leopold IV; Duke of Austria; 1371–1411	Ernest; Duke of Austria; 1377–1424	Frederick IV; Duke of Austria; 1382–1439
Albert II of Germany; 1397–1439	Frederick III; HRE; 1415–1493	Albert VI; Archduke of Austria; 1418–1463	Sigismund; Archduke of Austria; 1427–1496
Ladislaus the Posthumous; 1440–1457	Maximilian I HRE; 1459–1519
Philip I of Castile; 1478–1506
Spanish / Iberian line	Austrian / HRE line
Charles V HRE; 1500–1558	Ferdinand I HRE; 1503–1564
Philip II of Spain; 1527–1598	Maximilian II; HRE; 1527–1576	Ferdinand II; Archduke of Austria; 1529–1595	Charles II; Archduke of Austria; 1540–1590
Carlos; Prince of Asturias; 1545–1568	Philip III of Spain; 1578–1621	Rudolf II; HRE; 1552–1612	Ernest of Austria; 1553–1595	Matthias; HRE; 1557–1619	Maximilian III; Archduke of Austria; 1558–1618	Albert VII; Archduke of Austria; 1559–1621	Wenceslaus; Archduke of Austria; 1561–1578	Andrew; Margrave of Burgau; 1558–1600	Charles; Margrave of Burgau; 1560–1618	Ferdinand II; HRE; 1578–1637	Maximilian Ernest of Austria; 1583–1616	Leopold V Archduke of Austria; 1586–1632	Charles of Austria; 1590–1624
Philip IV of Spain; 1605–1665	Charles of Austria; 1607–1632	Ferdinand of Austria; 1609–1641	John-Charles of Austria; 1605–1619	Ferdinand III; HRE; 1608–1657	Leopold Wilhelm of Austria; 1614–1662	Ferdinand Charles; Archduke of Austria; 1628–1662	Sigismund Francis; Archduke of Austria; 1630–1665
Balthasar Charles; Prince of Asturias; 1629–1646	Charles II of Spain; 1661–1700	Ferdinand IV; King of the Romans; 1633–1654	Leopold I HRE; 1640–1705	Charles Joseph of Austria; 1649–1664
Joseph I HRE; 1678–1711	Charles VI; HRE; 1685–1740
Lorraine
Maria Theresa; HRE; 1740–1780	Francis I HRE; 1745–1765
Habsburg-Lorraine
Joseph II; HRE; 1765–1790	Leopold II; HRE; 1790–1792
Francis II; HRE; 1792–1806

== See also ==
- Kings of Germany family tree. He was related to every other German king.

== Notes ==
Albert II of Germany House of Habsburg Born: 10 August 1397 Died: 27 October 1439
Regnal titles
Preceded by Sigismund	King of Hungary and Croatia; 1437–39	Succeeded by Ladislaus V Vladislaus I as contenders
Preceded by Sigismund	King of Germany; 1438–39	Succeeded by Frederick III
Preceded by Sigismund	King of Bohemia; 1438–39	Vacant Title next held by Ladislaus
Preceded by Albert IV	Duke of Austria; 1404–39	Vacant Title next held by Ladislaus
