= Elizabeth of Luxembourg =

Queen of Germany from 1438 to 1439

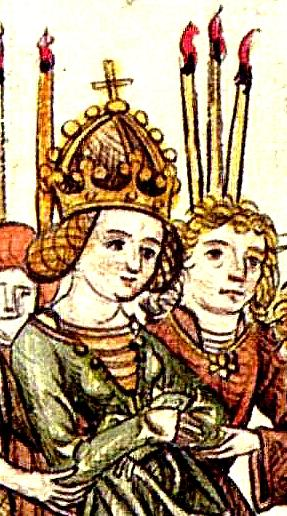
- Elizabeth (left) in a contemporary manuscript, c. 1440

Queen consort of Hungary
- Tenure: 1437–1440
- Coronation: 1 January 1438, Székesfehérvár

Queen consort of Germany
- Tenure: 1438–1439

Queen consort of Bohemia
- Tenure: 1438–1439
- Coronation: 29 June 1438, Prague
- Born: 7 October 1409; Visegrád, Hungary
- Died: 19 December 1442 (aged 33); Győr, Hungary
- Burial: Székesfehérvár Basilica, Hungary
- Spouse: Albert II of Germany (m. 1422; died 1439)
- Issue: Anne of Austria, Landgravine of Thuringia; Elizabeth, Queen of Poland; Ladislaus the Posthumous
- House: House of Luxembourg
- Father: Sigismund, Holy Roman Emperor
- Mother: Barbara of Cilli

Elizabeth of Luxembourg (Hungarian: Luxemburgi Erzsébet, Luxembourgish: Elisabeth vu Lëtzebuerg; 7 October 1409 – 19 December 1442) was queen consort of Hungary, queen consort of Germany and Bohemia.

The only child of Sigismund, Holy Roman Emperor, King of Hungary and Bohemia, Elizabeth was expected to ascend his thrones along with her husband, Albert II of Germany. After her father's death, Elizabeth and her husband were elected by the Hungarian estates as de facto equal rulers.

She could not completely assert her position, however, because the Veszprém bishop refused to give up on his right to crown the queen (the monarch was traditionally crowned by the Esztergom bishop). She was, however, recognised as co-ruler and played an active part in the government. After Albert's death, however, she was unable to prevent the election of a new king.

Albert died in 1439, leaving Elizabeth a pregnant dowager with two daughters, Anne and Elizabeth. Bohemian nobility proclaimed an interregnum, while Władysław III of Poland was crowned new king of Hungary in May 1440, three months after Queen Elizabeth delivered a son, Ladislaus the Posthumous. She was determined to contend for her patrimony on her son's behalf, which led to a civil war between her and Władysław III's supporters. The conflict ended with the queen's sudden death at the age of 33.

== Birth ==
Elizabeth was the only surviving child of Sigismund, Holy Roman Emperor, King of Hungary and Bohemia and Barbara of Cilli, Holy Roman Empress and Queen of Hungary and Bohemia. Her real birth date can be calculated by virtue of a letter of King Sigismund to Kéméndi Péter fia János (John, son of Peter Kemendi), Lord-lieutenant of Zala County dated 26 April 1410 (sabbato post festum s. Georgii) at Végles, Kingdom of Hungary (now Vígľaš, Slovakia) and sealed with Queen Barbara of Cilli's seal, who also stayed there and in which the king informs him about his daughter's birth alias circa festum beati Francisci confessoris. Because this feast falls on 4 October, it must have happened in the previous year, that is, 1409 and in October. Baranyai (1926) argues that the usage of circa can allow some variations towards September, but if it had occurred in September, he would have referred to the feast of Saint Michael, which falls on 29 September, instead of that of Francis of Assisi. The only remaining question, the exact day, is deduced from the engagement date of his daughter to Archduke Albert II of Germany, which was held on 7 October 1411, Pozsony, Kingdom of Hungary (now Bratislava, Slovakia, Pressburg in German) and probably may have adjusted to a former important event because it belongs to no religious feasts. The birthplace is also inferential and is traced back to the traditional place for the queen's labours that was in Visegrád and which is referred to in her Memoirs by Helene Kottannerin in the case of Queen Elisabeth advanced in pregnancy with Ladislaus the Posthumous in early 1440. In addition, the itinerary of King Sigismund shows that he stayed in Visegrád between 9 and 19 October 1409. In the end, one concludes that her birth in Prague, on 28 February 1409, similarly to the date of 27 November that year, which in reality was her christening day, is based on false sources.

== Childhood ==
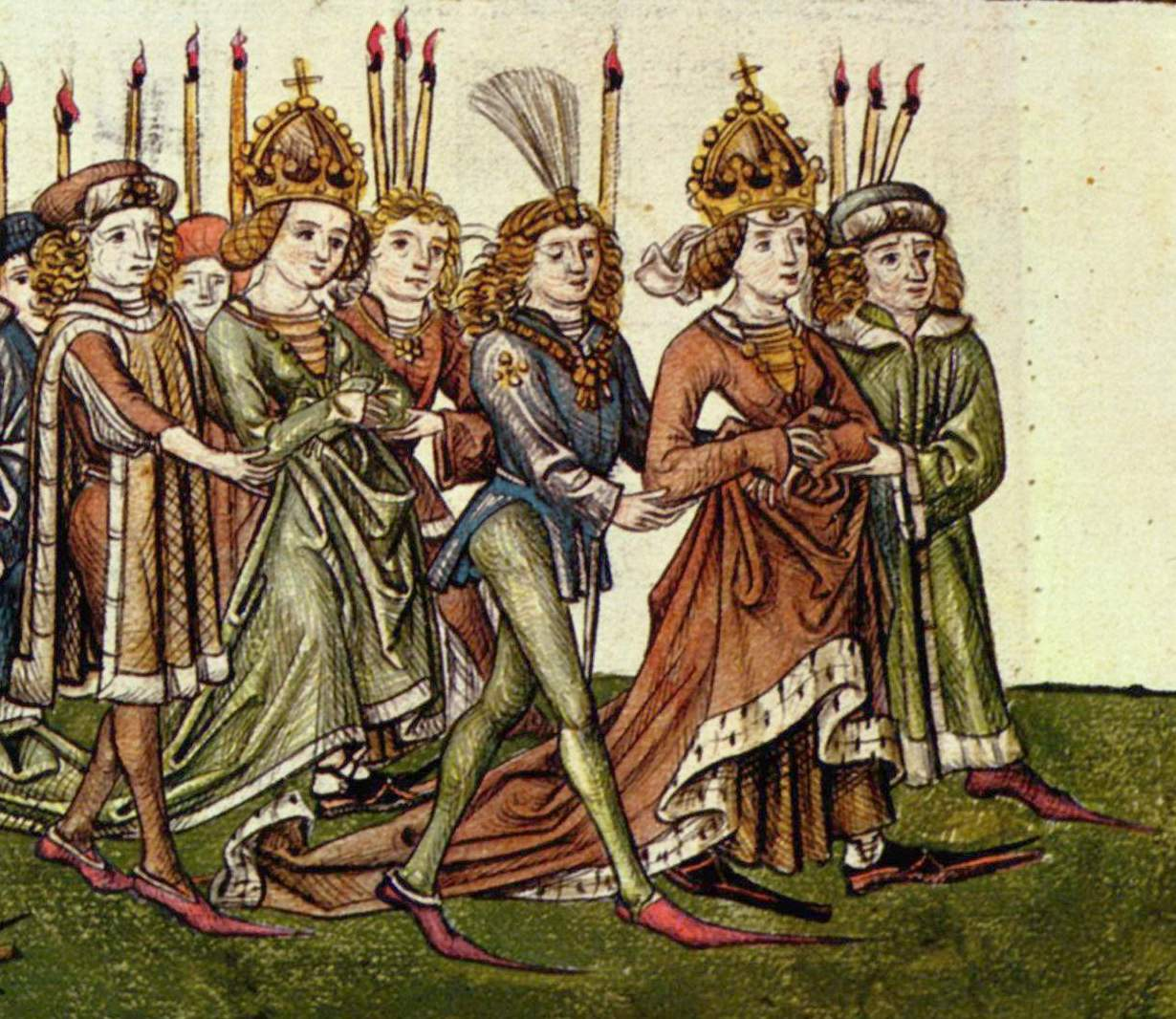
Elizabeth (left) and Barbara (right) in procession to Constance Cathedral, as illustrated in the Chronicle of the Council of Constance, c. 1440. Both mother and daughter are depicted wearing the Holy Crown of Hungary; in reality, Elizabeth was crowned two decades after the Council.

Elizabeth was born into the powerful House of Luxembourg. Her parents were the 41-year-old King Sigismund of Hungary and his second wife, the 17-year-old Barbara of Cilli. Hrvoje Vukčić Hrvatinić, the rebellious baron with whom Sigismund had recently come to terms, was the infant's godfather. The year after her birth, Elizabeth's father was elected King of the Romans.

As the king's only child, Elizabeth was seen as de facto heir presumptive to the throne, or at least as the princess whose eventual marriage would provide a king. In 1411, Sigismund managed to have the Hungarian estates promise that they would recognise Elizabeth's right to the Holy Crown of Hungary and elect her future husband as king, –an agreement that would have great consequences after Sigismund's death. Elizabeth's hereditary right was, in fact, rather slim, as her father had acquired it by marrying his first wife, Queen Mary, from whom Elizabeth was not descended. The same year, Sigismund betrothed Elizabeth to the Habsburg Duke Albert V of Austria, then aged 14.

Queen Barbara was very unpopular among the nobility, who resented her sympathy for the Hussites, the forerunners of the Protestant Reformation. In 1418, they accused her of having committed adultery while her husband was attending the Council of Constance. The resulting strain in the royal marriage led to the queen's banishment and confinement, first in Várad and subsequently in Szakolca, between 1418 and 1419. The fact that Elizabeth accompanied her mother into exile and presumably endured the same harsh treatment despite being recognised as heiress to the throne suggests that Sigismund may have doubted her paternity during that period. Nevertheless, Sigismund simultaneously negotiated her marriage to the Habsburg Albert II of Germany. The Habsburgs, Sigismund's longstanding friends and allies, evidently did not question Elizabeth's legitimacy or, at least, were not deterred by the accusations made against her mother. Sigismund reconciled with Barbara in 1419 and Elizabeth returned to his favour along with her mother. The same year, he inherited the Bohemian crown from his elder brother, Wenceslaus IV of Bohemia.

== Marriage ==
On 28 September 1421, the enduring friendship between King Sigismund and the House of Habsburg culminated in a marriage treaty signed in Vienna. The treaty confirmed Elizabeth's status as heiress presumptive of both Hungary and Bohemia but only for as long as she remained Sigismund's only child. It stipulated that the birth of another daughter would leave Elizabeth with the right to choose one of her father's kingdoms, and the younger sister would inherit the other. Should she gain a brother, however, she would be deprived of both crowns in his favour. The Margraviate of Moravia was ceded to Albert as Elizabeth's dowry. The treaty was controversial in both Hungary and Bohemia, as the nobility of both countries claimed the right to elect their monarch, even though their choice was normally the heir-in-blood.

Elizabeth formally married Albert in a splendid ceremony held on 19 April 1422 in Vienna. Elizabeth, now duchess of Austria, moved to the Viennese court of her husband. The papal dispensation for the marriage, necessary due to the couple's common descent from Wenceslaus II of Bohemia and Judith of Habsburg, was not sought until 1431, but was easily granted by Pope Eugene IV.

The couple's first child, a daughter named Anne, Duchess of Luxembourg, was born in 1432. The French travel writer Bertrandon de la Broquière noted that "the Duchess, a tall, handsome woman, daughter to the Emperor, and heiress after him to the kingdoms of Hungary and Bohemia and their dependencies", gave birth to a daughter, "which had occasioned festivals and tournaments that were the more numerously attended because hitherto she had not had any children." In 1435, Elizabeth delivered a son, George, who died within three hours. The next birth was that of another daughter, Elizabeth, in 1436.

== Queenship ==
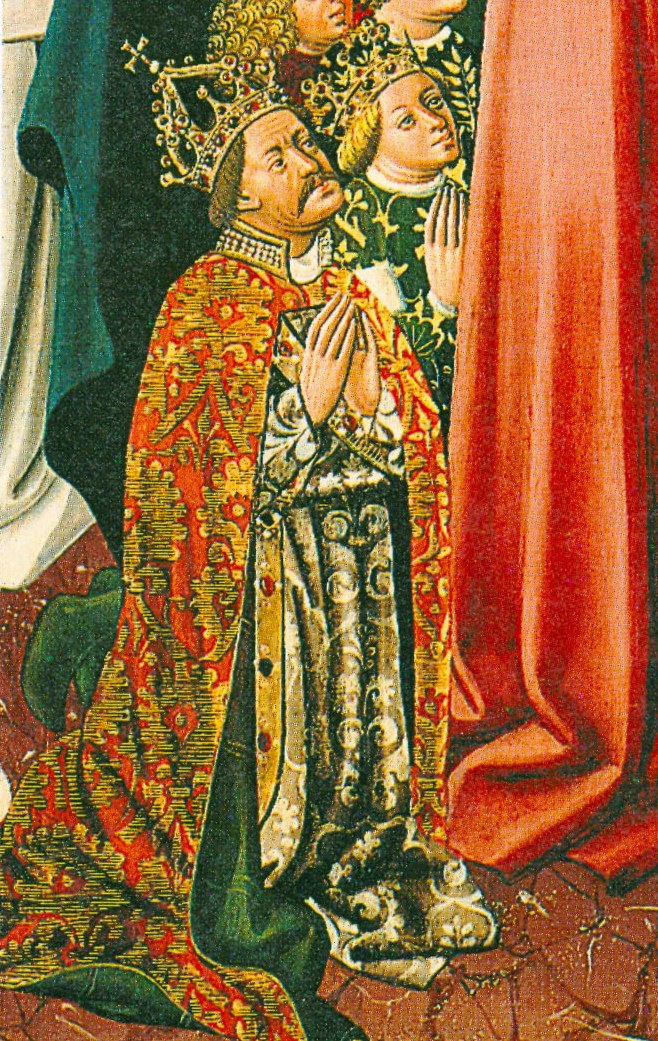
King Albert and Queen Elizabeth as depicted in the Albrechtsaltar in Klosterneuburg Monastery

By the end of 1437, Elizabeth's ageing father was gravely ill. Realising that his death was imminent, he summoned Elizabeth and Albert to Znojmo and convened a meeting of the Bohemian nobility, which accepted the couple as his heirs at his request but reserved the right of a formal election. He died on 9 December. After his burial, Elizabeth and Albert travelled to Pressburg to meet with the Hungarian magnates. They requested that the couple reside in Hungary and that the kingdom's border with Austria remain unaltered. Afterwards, the Diet resolved that Albert, who was elected due to being Elizabeth's husband, should govern only "with her consent and approval". The couple accepted the conditions on 18 December and were elected king and queen of Hungary. Elizabeth later asserted that her sovereignty derived not only from her father's will but also from the will of the people.

A dispute immediately arose as to who was entitled to crown Elizabeth; the bishop of Veszprém claimed the right to crown Hungarian queens consort, but the archbishop of Esztergom argued that Elizabeth was a queen regnant and that he should therefore crown both her and Albert. The archbishop, probably bribed, eventually yielded and signed a deed resigning the function to the bishop but only on that occasion. The couple's coronation took place at Székesfehérvár Basilica on 1 January 1438.

In March 1438, the Imperial Diet elected Albert as Sigismund's successor on the German throne and Elizabeth consequently became queen of the Romans. Despite the Hussite attempts to enthrone Casimir IV Jagiellon, the Bohemian election in May ended in the couple's favour. Albert was crowned in June, but Elizabeth did not travel to Prague to take part in the ritual and spent the following summer governing Hungary.

A law in 1439 recognised that the crown belonged to the queen, not the king, by right of her birth. Both Komjathy and Andrássy note that although her position as queen-ruler was not questioned, that would not prevent the nobles later from electing a new king because of the belief that a woman would not be strong enough.

== Regency and throne claims ==
At the death of her husband, she took control of Hungary as regent. She was pregnant, and she was convinced the child was a son. She prepared for the election of the next monarch of Hungary and formed a political party of followers. Among her followers were her mother's Cilli relatives, represented by Ulrich II, Count of Cilli, the greatest fief holder in Hungary, the Szécsis, the Garays and the cities, and appointed followers to the posts of arch bishop and governor of the royal castle.

By 1440, Elisabeth was the de facto ruling monarch of Hungary, and her orders were respected and carried out, though she had not yet been elected by the council and confirmed as such. On 1 January 1440, the Hungarian council gathered to elect a monarch. Its decision was that because of the threats from the Ottoman Empire, Elisabeth could not be elected as monarch, since a warlord and a military leader were needed. There were also suggestions that Elisabeth should marry the male elected to be monarch. In the end, Vladislaus of Poland was elected King of Hungary.

Elisabeth officially accepted the decision, but shortly afterwards, she left Buda with her followers. On 15 May, she had her son crowned King of Hungary in Székesfehérvár with the Holy Crown stolen by Helene Kottannerin from the castle of Visegrád. On 17 July, Władysław III of Poland was crowned King of Hungary in Székesfehérvár without the Holy Crown. Northern Hungary supported Elisabeth, and she attacked Buda with an army led by John Jiskra of Brandýs, but was defeated. Elisabeth left her two younger children in the care of Emperor Frederick III and financed the civil war in Austria. Near the end of the Civil War, Elizabeth consolidated her power and won most battles. She personally led her troops in battles and encouraged her people. In 1442, a negotiation was issued by Cardinal Cesarini in Győr. Elisabeth and Władysław met and exchanged gifts. Władysław gave Elisabeth fur. Shortly afterwards, Elisabeth died. She was rumoured to have been poisoned.

Her only son Ladislaus Posthumus (born 1440) died without issue, which left the remaining kingdoms of the family to be succeeded by elected rulers.

Her daughters Anne of Luxembourg (1432–1462), and Elizabeth of Austria (1436–1505), continued the family which afterwards regained some of these kingdoms.

== Family and claims to thrones ==
Elizabeth was not the daughter of her father's first wife Mary of Hungary, and thus not descended from the Angevin kings of Hungary. However, she in many ways is descended from the old Árpád kings of Hungary.

Her paternal grandparents were Charles IV, Holy Roman Emperor and Elisabeth of Pomerania. Her maternal grandfather was Hermann II, Count of Celje, whose parents were the Styrian magnate Hermann I of Celje and Catherine of Bosnia (sister of the Hungarian queen Elizabeth of Bosnia). In right of the paternal grandparents, she was, through Emperor Charles, an heiress to the throne of Bohemia, and through Elisabeth of Pomerania, an heiress to the throne of Poland, of its Kujavian Piast branch of kings. Thus, she was a leading claimant to numerous Slavic kingdoms and principalities and other realms of Central and Eastern Europe.

She was also a descendant of Árpád kings of Hungary, through her great-grandmother Elisabeth of Bohemia (1292–1330), who herself was granddaughter of Kunigunda of Halych, whose mother Anna of Hungary, Duchess of Macsó was a daughter of King Béla IV of Hungary. Admittedly, that was not a very close Hungarian connection, but all other extant descendants of Árpáds were then approximately as distant. Additionally, she descended from Ottokar I of Bohemia's second wife, Constance of Hungary, daughter of Béla III of Hungary. Another genealogical connection to the kings of Hungary of the Árpád dynasty is through her mother, Queen Barbara of Celli. Barbara's paternal grandmother was a great-great-granddaughter of King Stephen V of Hungary and his wife Elizabeth the Cuman.

== Bibliography ==
- Baranyai, Béla: Zsigmond király un. Sárkány-rendje (The so-called Order of the Dragon of King Sigismund), Századok (Periodical Centuries), 59–60, 561–591, 681–719, 1925/1926 = Zsigmond király úgynevezett Sárkányrendje (The so-called Order of the Dragon of King Sigismund), offprint, Budapest, 1926
- Mályusz, Elemér: Zsigmondkori oklevéltár (Collection of Charters of the Age of King Sigismund) II. (1400–1410), Második rész (Part Two) (1407–1410), Akadémiai Kiadó, Budapest, 1958. = Magyar Országos Levéltár Kiadványai (Publications of National Archives of Hungary) II., Forráskiadványok (Source publications) 4.
- Borsa, Iván (ed.): Zsigmondkori oklevéltár (Collection of Charters of the Age of King Sigismund) III. (1411–1412) (Based on the Manuscript of Elemér Mályusz), Akadémiai Kiadó, Budapest, 1993. = János Varga (ed.-in-chief): A Magyar Országos Levéltár Kiadványai (Publications of National Archives of Hungary) II., Forráskiadványok (Source publications) 22.
- Van Antwerp Fine, John (2007). The Bosnian Church: Its Place in State and Society from the Thirteenth to the Fifteenth Century. Saqi. ISBN 978-0863565038.
- Bak, János M. (1992). The Laws of the Medieval Kingdom of Hungary: 1301-1457. C. Schlacks.
- Hoensch, Jörg K. (2000). Die Luxemburger: Eine spätmittelalterliche Dynastie gesamteuropäischer Bedeutung 1308-1437 (in German). Verlag W. Kohlhammer.
- Setton, Kenneth M.; Hazard, Harry Williams; Zacour, Norman P. (1990). A History of the Crusades: The Impact of the Crusades on Europe. University of Wisconsin Press. ISBN 0299107442.

Royal titles
Preceded by Barbara of Cilli	List of German queens 1438 – 1439	Vacant Title next held by Eleanor of Portugal, Holy Roman Empress
Preceded by Barbara of Cilli	Queen consort of Bohemia; 1438 – 1439	Vacant Title next held by Joanna of Rožmitál
Preceded by Barbara of Cilli	Queen consort of Hungary; 1437 – 1439	Vacant Title next held by Catherine of Poděbrady
