= Anne of Austria, Landgravine of Thuringia =

Duchess of Luxembourg (1432 – 1462)

Anne of Austria
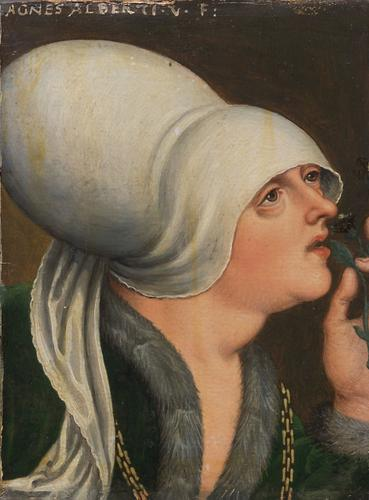
- Anne of Austria by Anton Boys
- Born: 12 April 1432; Vienna
- Died: 13 November 1462 (aged 30); Eckartsberga
- Spouse: William III of Thuringia, Duke of Luxemburg
- Issue: Margaret of Thuringia
- House: House of Habsburg
- Father: Albert II of Germany
- Mother: Elisabeth of Luxembourg

Anne of Austria (12 April 1432 – 13 November 1462) was a Duchess of Luxembourg in her own right and, as a consort, Landgravine of Thuringia and of Saxony.

== Life ==
Anne was the eldest daughter of Albert of Austria, the future Emperor-Elect and Elisabeth of Luxembourg, Queen of Bohemia, the sole descendant of Sigismund, Holy Roman Emperor. Her underage brother Ladislaus, Duke of Austria (1440–57) succeeded, as king of Bohemia and later also as king of Hungary. Anne also had a younger sister, Elisabeth, who later became Queen of Poland and Grand Duchess of Lithuania.

On 2 June 1446, at the age of 14, Anne was married to William "the Brave" of Saxony (1425–82), Landgrave of Thuringia, a younger son of Frederick I "the Warlike" of Saxony. In right of Anne, William became Duke of Luxembourg from 1457 when Anne's brother Ladislaus died childless. Though, their rights to the land were disputed by Philip III, Duke of Burgundy, and in 1469, William concluded that the possession's keeping was untenable against Burgundian attacks, and retreated to his Thuringian lands – that however took place when Anne was already dead.

Wilhelm rejected Anna after the death of her brother, since she was no longer useful to him in the power struggles. He instead turned to his lover Katharina von Brandenstein. Anna was kept until her death in the castle Eckartsburg. She once tried to go back to her husband, but he is said to have "welcomed" her by throwing a shoe in her face and to have immediately sent her back. Anna died at the age of 30 and was buried in the monastery Reinhardsbrunn. Wilhelm married Katharina shortly after.

== Marriage and issue ==
Anna and Wilhelm had two surviving daughters:

- Margaret of Thuringia (1449 – 13 July 1501), who married John II, Elector of Brandenburg
- Katharina of Thuringia (1453 – 10 July 1534), who married Duke Henry II of Münsterberg

== Sources ==
- Wilson, Peter H. (2016). Heart of Europe: A History of the Holy Roman Empire. The Belknap Press.
