= Felipe =

- Gender: Male

Other names
- Related names: Philip

Felipe is the Spanish variant of the name Philip, which derives from the Greek adjective Philippos "friend of horses". Felipe is also widely used in Portuguese-speaking Brazil alongside Filipe, the form commonly used in Portugal.

Notable people with this name include:

== Royalty ==
- Felipe I of Castile
- Felipe II of Spain
- Felipe III of Spain
- Felipe IV of Spain
- Felipe V of Spain
- Felipe VI of Spain
- Felipe de Marichalar y Borbón, nephew of the Spanish king

== Sports ==
=== Football ===
- Felipe (footballer, born 1977) (Felipe Jorge Loureiro), Brazilian footballer
- Felipe (footballer, born 1978) (Felipe Reinaldo da Silva), Brazilian footballer
- Felipe (footballer, born February 1984) (Luiz Felipe Ventura dos Santos), Brazilian footballer
- Felipe (footballer, born July 1984) (Felipe Dias da Silva dal Belo), Brazilian footballer
- Felipe (footballer, born 1988) (Felipe de Almeida Gomes), Brazilian footballer
- Felipe (footballer, born 1989) (Felipe Augusto de Almeida Monteiro), Brazilian footballer
- Felipe (footballer, born 1992) (Felipe de Sousa Silva), Brazilian footballer
- Felipe (footballer, born 1994) (Luiz Antonio Ferreira Rodrigues), Brazilian footballer
- Felipe (footballer, born 2000) (Felipe Ferreira da Cruz), Brazilian footballer
- Felipe Albuquerque, Brazilian footballer
- Felipe Alvarado (born 1999), Chilean footballer
- Felipe Banguero (born 1988), Colombian footballer
- Felipe Campos (Brazilian footballer), Brazilian footballer
- Felipe Caicedo, Ecuadorian footballer
- Felipe Espinoza (born 1999), Chilean footballer
- Felipe Félix, Brazilian footballer
- Felipe Fumaça (born 1993), known as Felipe, Brazilian footballer
- Felipe Guréndez (born 1975), known as Felipe, Spanish footballer
- Felipe Laurindo (born 2005), Brazilian footballer
- Felipe Mattioni (born 1988), Brazilian footballer
- Felipe Martins (footballer, born September 1990), commonly known as Felipe, Brazilian footballer
- Felipe Melo, Brazilian footballer
- Felipe Miñambres, Spanish footballer
- Felipe Ogaz (born 2003), Chilean footballer
- Felipe Peralta (born 1962), Paraguayan footballer
- Felipe Rodríguez-Gentile (born 2006), Argentine footballer

=== Other sports ===
- Felipe Alou (born 1935), Dominican baseball player and manager
- Felipe Conceição (born 1979), Brazilian footballer and manager
- Felipe Contepomi (born 1977), Argentine rugby union player
- Felipe Drugovich (born 2000), Brazilian racing driver
- Felipe Franco, Brazilian water polo player
- Felipe Kitadai (born 1989), Brazilian Olympic medalist judoka
- Felipe Massa (born 1981), Brazilian Formula E driver
- Felipe Muñoz, Mexican breaststroke swimmer
- Felipe Nasr, Brazilian former Formula One driver
- Felipe Paulino (born 1983), Dominican-Venezuelan baseball pitcher
- Felipe Reyes, Spanish basketball player
- Felipe Santos (disambiguation), multiple sportsmen
- Felipe Vázquez, Venezuelan baseball player

== Other occupations ==
- Felipe Becari (born 1987), Brazilian politician
- Felipe Calderón, former President of Mexico
- Felipe Espinosa (1836–1863), Mexican-American murderer
- Felipe Herrera, Chilean economist
- Felipe Pacheco, Costa Rican-born American sound editor
- Felipe Rivero Diaz, Cuban exile
- Felipe Sousa-Lazaballet (born 1986), Brazilian-American politician
- Felipe Vasques (born 1992), Brazilian politician
- Felipe Zúniga del Cid (born 1948), Honduran politician
- FELIPE may refer to the Popular Liberation Front in Spain

== Nickname ==
- André Felipe (born 1990), Brazilian former footballer
- Caio Felipe (footballer, born February 1999), Brazilian footballer
- Caio Felipe (footballer, born April 1999), Brazilian footballer
- Juan Felipe (born 1987), Brazilian footballer
- Marcos Felipe (born 1996), Brazilian footballer
- Pedro Felipe (footballer, born 1997), Brazilian footballer
- Pedro Felipe (footballer, born 2004), Brazilian footballer
- Zé Felipe (born 1998), Brazilian singer and songwriter

== Surname ==
- Alex Felipe (1993–2026), Brazilian futsal player
- Julián Felipe (1861–1944), Filipino composer
- León Felipe (1884–1968), Spanish anti-fascist poet and academic
- Luis Felipe (gang leader) (born 1962), Cuban former gang leader
- Sergio Felipe (born 1991), Uruguayan footballer

== See also ==
- Convento de San Felipe el Real (Madrid)
- Felipe López (disambiguation)
- Felipe (or Felipillo), a native Peruvian who accompanied Francisco Pizarro and Diego de Almagro on their various expeditions to Peru as an interpreter
