= List of Prussian monarchs =

Monarchy of Prussia
- König von Preußen
- Royal coat of arms

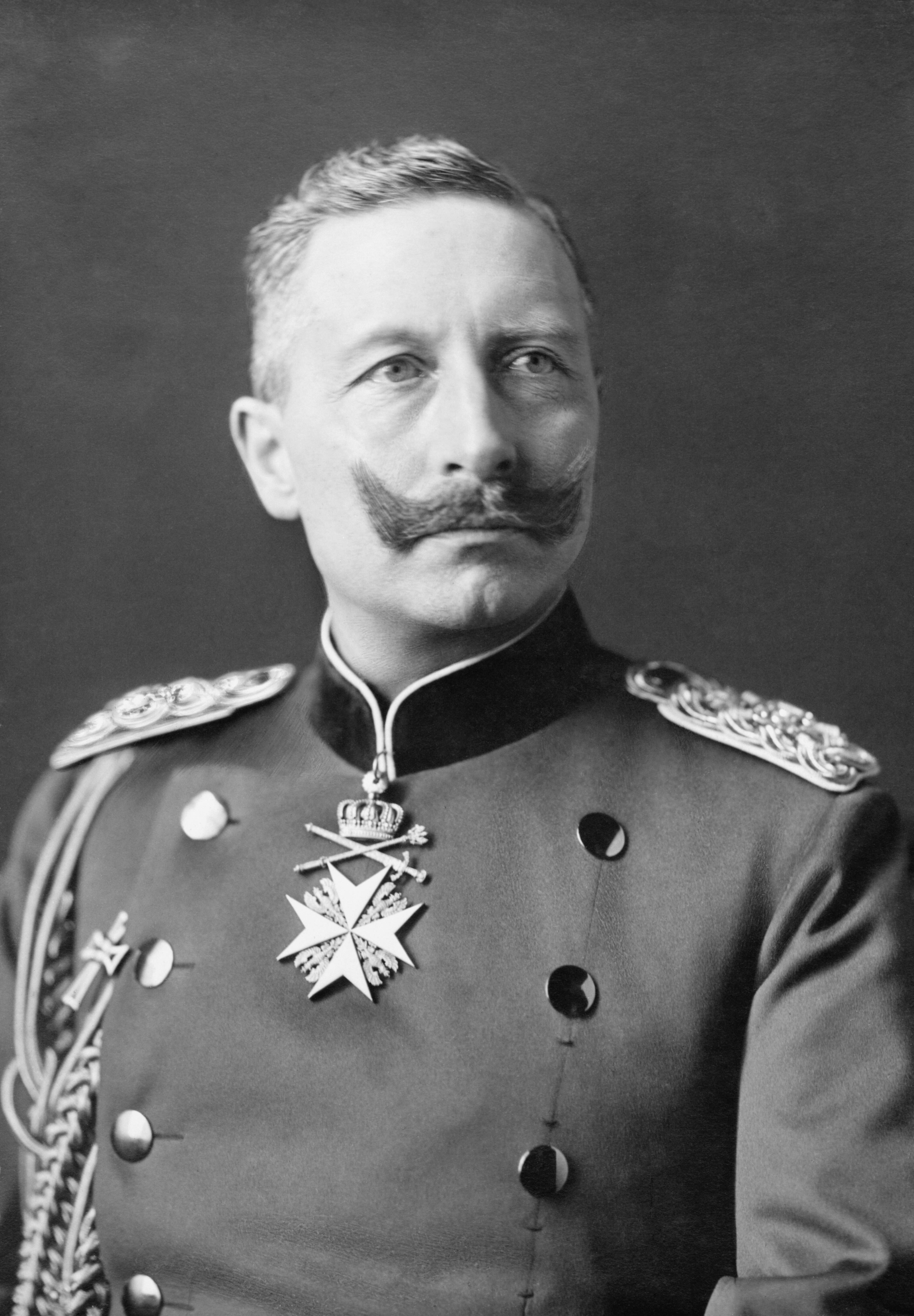
- Last to reign: Wilhelm II; 15 June 1888 – 9 November 1918

Details
- Style: His Majesty
- First monarch: Albert (as Duke)
- Last monarch: Wilhelm II
- Formed: 10 April 1525
- Abolished: 9 November 1918
- Residences: Königsberg Castle; Stadtschloss, Berlin (last)
- Appointer: Hereditary
- Pretender: Georg Friedrich

The monarchs of Prussia were members of the House of Hohenzollern who were the hereditary rulers of the former German state of Prussia from its founding in 1525 as the Duchy of Prussia. The Duchy had evolved out of the Teutonic Order, a Roman Catholic crusader state and theocracy located along the eastern coast of the Baltic Sea. The Teutonic Knights were under the leadership of a Grand Master, the last of whom, Albert, converted to Protestantism and secularized the lands, which then became the Duchy of Prussia.

The Duchy was initially a vassal of the Kingdom of Poland, as a result of the terms of the Prussian Homage whereby Albert was granted the Duchy as part of the terms of peace following the Prussian War. When the main line of Prussian Hohenzollerns died out in 1618, the Duchy passed to a different branch of the family, who also reigned as Electors of Brandenburg in the Holy Roman Empire. While still nominally two different territories, Prussia under the suzerainty of Poland and Brandenburg under the suzerainty of the Holy Roman Empire, the two states are known together historiographically as Brandenburg-Prussia.

Royal Standard of the King of Prussia (1871–1918)

Following the third Northern War, a series of treaties freed the Duchy of Prussia from vassalage to any other state, making it a fully sovereign Duchy in its own right. This complex situation (where the Hohenzollern ruler of the independent Duchy of Prussia was also a subject of the Holy Roman Emperor as Elector of Brandenburg) laid the eventual groundwork for the establishment of the Kingdom of Prussia in 1701. For diplomatic reasons, the rulers of Prussia called themselves King in Prussia from 1701 to 1772. They still nominally owed fealty to the Emperor as Electors of Brandenburg, so the "King in Prussia" title (as opposed to "King of Prussia") avoided offending the Emperor. Additionally, calling themselves "King of Prussia" implied sovereignty over the entire Prussian region, parts of which were still part of Poland.

As the Prussian state grew through several wars and diplomatic moves throughout the 18th century, it became apparent that Prussia had become a Great Power in its own right. By 1772, the pretense was dropped, and the style "King of Prussia" was adopted. The Prussian kings continued to use the title "Elector of Brandenburg" until the dissolution of the Holy Roman Empire in 1806, reflecting the legal fiction that their domains within the empire were still under the ultimate overlordship of the Emperor. Legally, the Hohenzollerns ruled Brandenburg in personal union with their Prussian kingdom, but in practice they treated their domains as a single unit. The Hohenzollerns gained de jure sovereignty over Brandenburg when the empire dissolved in 1806, and Brandenburg was formally merged into Prussia.

In 1871, in the aftermath of the Franco-Prussian War, the German Empire was formed, and the King of Prussia, Wilhelm I was crowned German Emperor. From that point forward, though the Kingdom of Prussia retained its status as a constituent state of the empire (by far the largest and most powerful), all subsequent Kings of Prussia also served as German Emperor, and that title took precedence.

== Duchy of Prussia (1525–1701) ==
Name	Lifespan	Reign start	Reign end	Notes	Family	Image
Albert	17 May 1490 – 20 March 1568 (aged 77)	10 April 1525	20 March 1568	Grand Master of Teutonic Knights, granted the title of Duke of Prussia	Hohenzollern	Albert, Duke of Prussia
Albert Frederick	7 May 1553 – 27 August 1618 (aged 65)	20 March 1568	27 August 1618	Son of Albert	Hohenzollern	Albert Frederick, Duke of Prussia
John Sigismund	8 November 1572 – 23 December 1619 (aged 47)	27 August 1618	23 December 1619	Son in law and second cousin thrice removed of Albert Frederick, also Elector of Brandenburg	Hohenzollern	John Sigismund, Duke of Prussia
George William	13 November 1595 – 1 December 1640 (aged 45)	23 December 1619	1 December 1640	Son of John Sigismund, also Elector of Brandenburg	Hohenzollern	George William, Duke of Prussia
Frederick William: the Great Elector	16 February 1620 – 29 April 1688 (aged 68)	1 December 1640	29 April 1688	Son of George William, also Elector of Brandenburg	Hohenzollern	Frederick William, Duke of Prussia
Frederick I	11 July 1657 – 25 February 1713 (aged 55)	29 April 1688	18 January 1701	Son of Frederick William, also Elector of Brandenburg	Hohenzollern	Frederick I, Duke of Prussia

== Kingdom of Prussia (1701–1918) ==
Name	Lifespan	Reign start	Reign end	Notes	Family	Image
Frederick I: the Mercenary King	11 July 1657 – 25 February 1713 (aged 55)	18 January 1701	25 February 1713	Son of Frederick William, also Elector of Brandenburg	Hohenzollern	Frederick I of Prussia
Frederick William I: the Soldier King	14 August 1688 – 31 May 1740 (aged 51)	25 February 1713	31 May 1740	Son of Frederick I	Hohenzollern	Frederick William I of Prussia
Frederick II: the Great	24 January 1712 – 17 August 1786 (aged 74)	31 May 1740	17 August 1786	Son of Frederick William I	Hohenzollern	Frederick II of Prussia
Frederick William II	25 September 1744 – 16 November 1797 (aged 53)	17 August 1786	16 November 1797	Nephew of Frederick II, grandson of Frederick William I	Hohenzollern	Frederick William II of Prussia
Frederick William III	3 August 1770 – 7 June 1840 (aged 69)	16 November 1797	7 June 1840	Son of Frederick William II	Hohenzollern	Frederick William III of Prussia
Frederick William IV	15 October 1795 – 2 January 1861 (aged 65)	7 June 1840	2 January 1861	Son of Frederick William III; also President of the Erfurt Union (1849–1850)	Hohenzollern	Frederick William IV of Prussia
William I	22 March 1797 – 9 March 1888 (aged 90)	2 January 1861	9 March 1888	Brother of Frederick William IV, son of Frederick William III; also President of the North German Confederation (1867–1871) and German Emperor (from 1871)	Hohenzollern	Wilhelm I of Prussia
Frederick III	18 October 1831 – 15 June 1888 (aged 56)	9 March 1888	15 June 1888	Son of William I; also German Emperor; only Prussian monarch to rule for less than one year	Hohenzollern	Frederick III of Prussia
William II	27 January 1859 – 4 June 1941 (aged 82)	15 June 1888	9 November 1918 (abdicated)	Son of Frederick III; also German Emperor; also last King of Prussia and last German Emperor	Hohenzollern	William II of Prussia

== Family tree ==
Frederick I, Elector of Brandenburg
Albrecht III Achilles, Elector of Brandenburg
John Cicero, Elector of Brandenburg
Joachim I Nestor, Elector of Brandenburg	Frederick I of Ansbach and Bayreuth; 1460–1536	Sophia; Jagiellon; 1464–1512
Albert; 1490-1525-1568	Anna Marie of Brunswick- Lüneburg; 1532–1568	Joachim II Hector, Elector of Brandenburg	Sophie of Brandenburg- Ansbach- Kulmbach; 1485–1537	Frederick II of Legnica; 1480–1547	Casimir of Brandenburg- Bayreuth; 1481–1527	Susanna of Bavaria; 1502–1543	Hedwig of Münsterberg and Oleśnica; 1508–1531	George of Brandenburg- Ansbach; 1484–1543	Emilie of Saxony; 1516–1591
Albert; Frederick; 1553-1568-1618	Marie Eleonore of Cleves; 1550–1608	John George of Brandenburg; 1525-1598	Sophie of Legnica; 1525–1546	Marie of Brandenburg- Kulmbach; 1519–1567	Frederick III, Elector; Palatine; 1515–1576	William I of Nassau- Dillenburg; 1487–1559	Anna Maria of Brandenburg- Ansbach; 1526–1589	George Frederick regent 1539-1577-1603
Anna Sophia of Prussia; 1527–1591	Eleanor of Prussia; 1583–1607	Joachim; Frederick of Brandenbrug regent 1546-1605-1608	Catherine of Brandenburg- Küstrin; 1549–1602	Louis VI, Elector; Palatine; 1539–1583	William I of the Netherlands; 1533–1584	Elisabeth of Nassau- Dillenburg; 1542–1603	Sabine of Württemberg; 1549–1581	John VI of Nassau- Dillenburg; 1536–1606
Magdalene of Brandenburg; 1582–1616	Anna of Prussia; 1576–1625	John Sigismund; 1572-1618-1619 regent 1611–1618	Anna Maria of the Palatinate; 1561–1589	Frederick IV, Elector; Palatine; 1574–1610	Louise Juliana of Nassau; 1576–1644	John Albert I of Solms- Braunfels	John VII of Nassau- Siegen; 1561–1623	John VII of Mecklenburg; 1558–1592
Anne Eleonore of Hesse- Darmstadt; 1601–1659	George; William; 1595-1619-1640	Elizabeth; Charlotte of the Palatinate; 1597–1660	Frederick V Elector; Palatine; 1596–1632	Frederick; Henry of Orange; 1584–1617	Amalia of Solms- Braunfels; 1602–1675	Maurice of Hesse-Kassel; 1572–1632	Juliane of Nassau- Siegen; 1587–1643
George William of Saxe- Lauenburg; 1624–1705	Ernest; Augustus of Hanover; 1629–1698	Sophia of the Palatinate; 1630–1714	Frederick; William; 1620-1640-1688	Louise; Henriette of Orange; 1627–1667	John Albert of Mecklenburg; 1590–1636
Sophia; Dorothea of Celle; 1666–1726	George I of Great; Britain; 1660–1727	Sophia; Charlotte of Hanover; 1688–1705	Frederick I 1657-1688-1713	Catherine of Sweden; 1584–1638	John Casimir of Kleeburg; 1589–1652
Caroline of Ansbach; 1683–1737	George II of Great Britain; 1683–1760	Sophia; Dorothea of Hanover; 1687–1757	Frederick; William I 1688–1713-1740	Louis IX of Hesse- Darmstadt; 1719–1790	Eleonora; Catherine of Zweibrücken; 1626–1692	Frederick of Hesse- Eschwege; 1617–1655	Elisabeth; Sophie of Mecklenburg; 1613–1676
Frederick, Prince of Wales; 1707–1751	Augusta of Saxe-Gotha; 1719–1772	Charles Louis; Frederick of Mecklenburg; 1708–1752	Elisabeth; Albertine of Saxe- Hildburghausen; 1713–1761	Christine of Hesse- Eschwege; 1648–1702	Ferdinand; Albert I of Brunswick- Wolfenbüttel; 1636–1687
George III of the United; Kingdom; 1738–1820	Charlotte of Mecklenburg- Strelitz; 1744–1818	Charles II of Mecklenburg- Strelitz; 1741–1816	Antoinette of Brunswick- Wolfenbüttel; 1696–1762	Ferdinand; Albert II of Brunswick- Wolfenbüttel; 1680–1735	Amalie of Hesse- Darmstadt; 1754–1832
Augustus; William of Prussia; 1722–1758	Luise of Brunswick- Wolfenbüttel; 1722–1780	Frederick II the Great; 1712-1740-1786	Elisabeth; Christine of Brunswick- Wolfenbüttel; 1715–1797	Philippine; Charlotte of Prussia; 1716–1801	Charles I of Brunswick- Wolfenbüttel; 1713–1780	Louise of Hesse- Darmstadt; 1757–1830	Caroline of Baden; 1776–1841
William IV of the United; Kingdom; 1765–1837	Sophie; Antoinette of Brunswick- Wolfenbüttel; 1724–1802	Frederica; Louisa of Hesse- Darmstadt; 1751–1805	Frederick; William II; 1744-1786-1797	Elizabeth; Christine of Brunswick- Woldenbüttel; 1746–1840
Augusta of Great; Britain; 1737–1813	Charles; William of Brunswick- Wolfenbüttel; 1735–1806	Francis of Saxe-Coburg- Saalfeld1750–1806	Frederick; William III; 1770-1797-1840	Louise of Mecklenburg- Strelitz; 1776–1810	Charles; Frederick of Saxe-Weimar- Eisenach; 1783–1853
Caroline of Brunswick- Wolfenbüttel; 1768–1821	George IV of the United; Kingdom; 1762–1830	Frederick of York and Albany; 1763–1827	Frederica; Charlotte of Prussia; 1767–1820
Edward of Kent and Strathearn; 1767–1820	Victoria of Saxe-Coburg- Saalfeld; 1786–1861	Emich Carl of Leiningen; 1763–1814	Ernerst I of Saxe-Coburg and Gotha; 1784–1844	Louise of Saxe-Gotha- Altenburg; 1800–1831	William I the Great; 1797-1861-1888	Augusta of Saxe- Weimar- Eisenach; 1811–1890	Caroline; Matilda of Great; Britain; 1751–1775	Frederick; William IV of Prussia; 1795-1840-1861	Elisabeth; Ludovika of Bavaria; 1801–1873
Victoria of the United; Kingdom; 1819–1901	Albert of Saxe-Coburg and Gotha; 1819–1861	Louise; Augusta of Denmark; 1771–1843	Frederick; Christian II of Schleswig- Holstein; 1765–1814
Feodora of Leiningen; 1807–1872	Ernest I of Hohenlohe- Langenburg; 1794–1860	Victoria of the United; Kingdom; 1840–1901	Frederick III; 1831-1888-1888	Louise; Sophie of Danneskiold- Samsøe; 1796–1867	Christian; August II of Augustenburg; 1798–1869
Adelheid of Hohenlohe- Langenburg; 1835–1900	Frederick VIII of Schleswig- Holstein; 1829–1880	Frederick; Francis II of Mecklenburg- Schwerin; 1823–1883	Augusta; Reuss of Köstritz; 1822–1862	Alexander II of Russia; 1818-1855-1881	Maria of Hesse and by Rhine; 1824–1880
Augusta; Victoria of Schleswig- Holstein; 1858–1921	William II; 1859-1888-1918-1941 in pretence 1918–1941	Frederick; Francis III of Mecklenburg; Schwerin; 1851–1897	Marie of Mecklenburg- Schwerin; 1854–1920	Vladimir; Alexandrovich of Russia; 1847–1909	Maria; Alexandrovna of Russia; 1853–1920	Alfred of Saxe-Coburg and Gotha; 1844–1900
Wilhelm in pretence 1882-1941-1951	Cecilie of Mecklenburg- Schwerin; 1886–1945	Kirill; Vladimirovich of Russia; 1876–1938	Victoria; Melita of Saxe-Coburg and Gotha; 1876–1936
Louis; Ferdinand in pretence 1907-1951-1994	Kira; Kirillovna of Russia; 1909–1967
Donata of Castell- Rüdenhausen; 1950–2015	Louis; Ferdinand of Prussia; 1944–1977
Georg; Friedrich in pretence 1976-1994-

== See also ==
- Constitution of Prussia (1850)
- Crown of Frederick I
- Crown of William II
- German Emperor
- History of Germany
- History of Prussia
- Hohenzollern Castle
- King in Prussia
- List of monarchs of Germany
- List of rulers of Brandenburg
- List of Prussian royal consorts
- Lückentheorie
- Minister President of Prussia
- Neuchâtel Crisis
- Year of the Three Emperors
