= Luis Filipe =

Luís Filipe
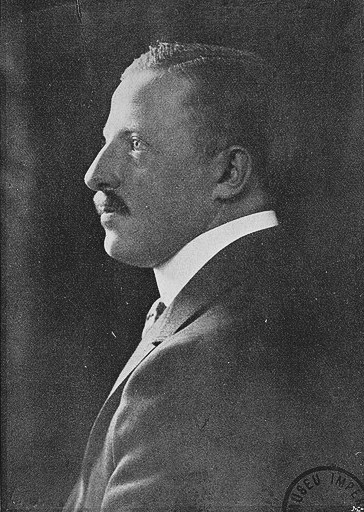
- Prince Luís Filipe of Orléans-Braganza

Other gender
- Feminine: Luísa Filipa

Other names
- Alternative spelling: Luis Filipe
- Anglicisation: Louis Philip
- Related names: Luis, Filipe
- See also: Luis Felipe, Luiz Felipe

Luís Filipe is a masculine double name, the Portuguese form of the English double name Louis Philip. The primary form of the name is Louis-Philippe in French, and it is now present in several languages, such as Luigi Filippo in Italian, Luis Felipe in Spanish, and Ludwig Philipp in German.

The spelling Luís is also written as Luiz due to the influence of archaic Portuguese, where names were written without standardized rules. Luis (without the accent) is incorrect and archaic, influenced by Castilian, as is the form Felipe, also of Castilian influence; Filipe is the correct form in Portuguese grammar.

== Personalities ==
- Luís Filipe, Prince Royal of Portugal (1887–1908), eldest son of King Dom Carlos I
- Luis Felipe Ramón y Rivera (1913–1993), Venezuelan composer, teacher, musician, folklorist and writer
- Luis Felipe Bravo Mena (born 1952), Mexican politician
- Luis Felipe Tovar (born 1961), Mexican performance teacher and actor
- Luis Felipe (gang leader) (born 1961), former leader of the Latin Kings
- Luis Felipe (footballer, born 2001), Brazilian footballer
- Luís Figo (born 1972), retired Portuguese football midfielder
- Luís Filipe (footballer, born 1979), Portuguese football defender/midfielder
- Luís Felipe (footballer, born 1991), Brazilian football defender
- Luís Felipe (footballer, born 2000), Brazilian football forward
- Luiz Felipe (footballer, born 1985), Brazilian football defender
- Luiz Felipe (footballer, born 1993), Brazilian football defender
- Luiz Felipe (footballer, born 1996), Brazilian football midfielder
- Luiz Felipe (footballer, born March 1997), Italian football defender
- Luiz Felipe (footballer, born April 1997), Brazilian football goalkeeper
- Luiz Felipe (footballer, born 2006), Brazilian football defender
- Luis Felipe Fernandes (born 1996), Brazilian-American football midfielder
- Luiz Filipe (footballer, born 2001), Brazilian football midfielder/forward

== See also ==
- Felipe (disambiguation) (Spanish)
- Filipe (Portuguese)
- Filipe Luís Kasmirski, Brazilian football defender
- Louis Philip (disambiguation)
- Philip (name) (English)
