= Marie Eleonore of Brandenburg, Countess Palatine of Simmern =

German Countess Palatine

Marie Eleonore von Brandenburg
- Countess Palatine

Regent of Palatinate-Simmern-Kaiserslautern
- Reign: 6 July 1655 - 1658
- Born: 1 April 1607; Cölln
- Died: 18 February 1675; Bad Kreuznach
- Burial: Stephen's Church, Simmern im Hunsrück
- Spouse: Louis Philip, Count Palatine of Simmern-Kaiserslautern
- Issue: Charles Frederick; Gustavus Louis; Charles Philip; Louis Casimir; Elizabeth Maria Charlotte; Louis Henry, Count Palatine of Simmern-Kaiserslautern; Louise Sophie Eleanore
- House: Hohenzollern
- Father: Joachim Frederick, Elector of Brandenburg
- Mother: Eleanor of Prussia

Marie Eleonore von Brandenburg (1607-1675) was a princess of Brandenburg, Countess Palatine and from 1655 to 1658, regent of Simmern.

== Biography ==
Marie Eleonore was the only child of Elector Joachim Frederick of Brandenburg from his second marriage to Eleanor of Prussia, daughter of Albert Frederick, Duke of Prussia. Orphaned as an infant, she grew up with her uncle Christian, Margrave of Brandenburg-Bayreuth.

On 4 December 1631 she married Count Palatine Ludwig Philipp von Simmern (1602–1655), a brother of the Bohemian Winter King Frederick V of the Palatinate, in Cölln.

In the spring of 1632, after the liberation by the Swedes, the couple was able to move to the Palatinate. Ludwig Philipp acted as the administrator of the Electoral Palatinate, but was expelled again in 1635 by imperial troops. Marie Eleonore and her husband lived in exile in Metz and Sedan for a few years.

After Ludwig Philipp's death in 1655, his nephew Karl Ludwig claimed guardianship of Palatinate-Simmern-Kaiserslautern. However, Marie Eleonore, described as energetic, resisted these efforts with the support of her grandnephew, Elector Friedrich Wilhelm von Brandenburg, and asserted her regency.

Holy Roman Emperor Ferdinand III confirmed her on 6 July 1655 as regent of the principality, pending the adulthood of her son. Marie Eleonore resided in Kaiserslautern.

In 1658, her child, Ludwig Heinrich, turned 18 and her regency ended. Ludwig Heinrich was the count till 1674.

== Issue ==
Louis Philip and Marie Eleonore had seven children, only two of whom survived to adulthood.

- Charles Frederick (6 January 1633 - 13 January 1635)
- Gustavus Louis (1 March 1634 - 5 August 1635)
- Charles Philip (20 April 1635 - 24 February 1636)
- Louis Casimir (27 September 1636 - 14 December 1652)
- Elizabeth Maria Charlotte (23/24 October 1638 - 10/22 May 1664), wife of George III of Brieg, had no issue
- Louis Henry (11 October 1640 - 3 January 1674), married Maria of Orange-Nassau (1642–1688), had no issue
- Louise Sophie Eleanore (27 June 1642 - 29 March 1643)

She survived all of her children, and her son, Louis Henry, had no children of his own. This ended the Palatinate-Simmern line.
