= Felipinho =

Felipinho is a nickname, a diminutive for Felipe. It may refer to:

- Felipinho (footballer, born 1992), Felipe Barreto da Silva, Brazilian football forward
- Felipinho (footballer, born January 1997), André Felipe de Almeida Santos, Brazilian football defender
- Felipinho (footballer, born 2001), Antonio Feliphe Costa Silva, Brazilian football midfielder
- Felipinho (footballer, born 2002), Felipe José Almeida da Rocha, Brazilian football forward
- Felipe Rodríguez-Gentile (born 2006), known as Felipinho, Brazilian-born, Argentine forward
