= Henry of Bavaria =

Henry of Bavaria may refer to:

- Henry I, Duke of Bavaria (919/921–955)
- Henry II, Duke of Bavaria (951–995)
- Henry III, Duke of Bavaria (940–989)
- Henry IV, Duke of Bavaria (972–1024), more commonly called Henry II, Holy Roman Emperor
- Henry V, Duke of Bavaria (died 1026)
- Henry VI, Duke of Bavaria (1017–1056), more commonly called Henry III, Holy Roman Emperor
- Henry VII, Duke of Bavaria (died 1047)
- Henry VIII, Duke of Bavaria (1050–1106), more commonly called Henry IV, Holy Roman Emperor
- Henry IX, Duke of Bavaria (1075–1126)
- Henry the Proud (Henry X) Duke of Bavaria (c. 1108–1139)
- Henry XI, Duke of Bavaria (1107–1177), more commonly called Henry II, Duke of Austria
- Henry XII, Duke of Bavaria (1129–1195), more commonly called Henry the Lion
- Henry XIII, Duke of Bavaria (1235–1290), ruler of Lower Bavaria
- Henry XIV, Duke of Bavaria (1305–1339), ruler of Lower Bavaria
- Henry XV, Duke of Bavaria (1312–1333), ruler of Lower Bavaria
- Henry XVI, Duke of Bavaria (1386–1450), ruler of Bavaria-Landshut and Bavaria-Ingolstadt
- Henry of the Palatinate (1487–1552)
- Maximilian Henry of Bavaria (1621–1688)
- Louis Henry, Count Palatine of Simmern-Kaiserslautern (1640-1674)
- Otto Henry, Count Palatine of Sulzbach (1556–1604)
- Otto Henry, Elector Palatine (1502–1559)
