= Augustiner-Chorfrauenstift (Kreuznach) =

Nunnery in Europe

Coordinates: 49°50′14″N 7°51′12″E

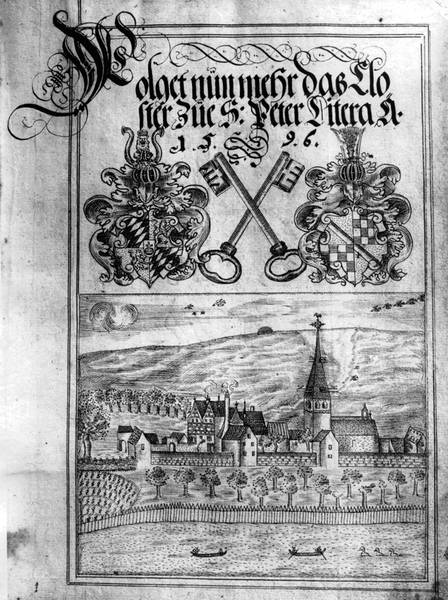
An engraving of the monastery by Jacob Lamb in 1596.

The Augustiner-Chorfrauenstift was an Augustinian nunnery in what is now Bad Kreuznach in Rhineland-Palatinate in Germany. It existed between 1140 and 1669. It was known in the Middle Ages as the Monasterium or coenobium S. Petri apud (or prope or iuxta) Crucenacum monialium ordinis S. Augustini. In 1669 parts of it were converted into the Schloss Oranienhof, which was destroyed in 1689 and partly rebuilt early in the 19th century. From 1834/42 to 1929 the site was also occupied by the Hotel Oranienhof.

A late Gothic picture of grace (Pietà) of "Our Lady of Sorrow", for whose worship Pope Alexander VI had promised a 40-day indulgence in 1502, was located in the monastery church of St. Peter. The sculpture was taken by the nuns on their flight and was for a long time worshipped in St. Agnes in Mainz, then from 1802 until its destruction in 1942 in the parish church St. Quintin's Church, Mainz.

== Bibliography ==
- Michael Kuen: S. Petri. In: ders.: Collectio Scriptorum Rerum Historico-Monastico-Ecclesiasticarum Variorum Religiosorum Ordinum, Bd. V/1. Wagegg / Wohler, Günzburg / Ulm 1765, S. 282f
