= Maria of Orange-Nassau =

Countess Palatine of Simmern-Kaiserslautern

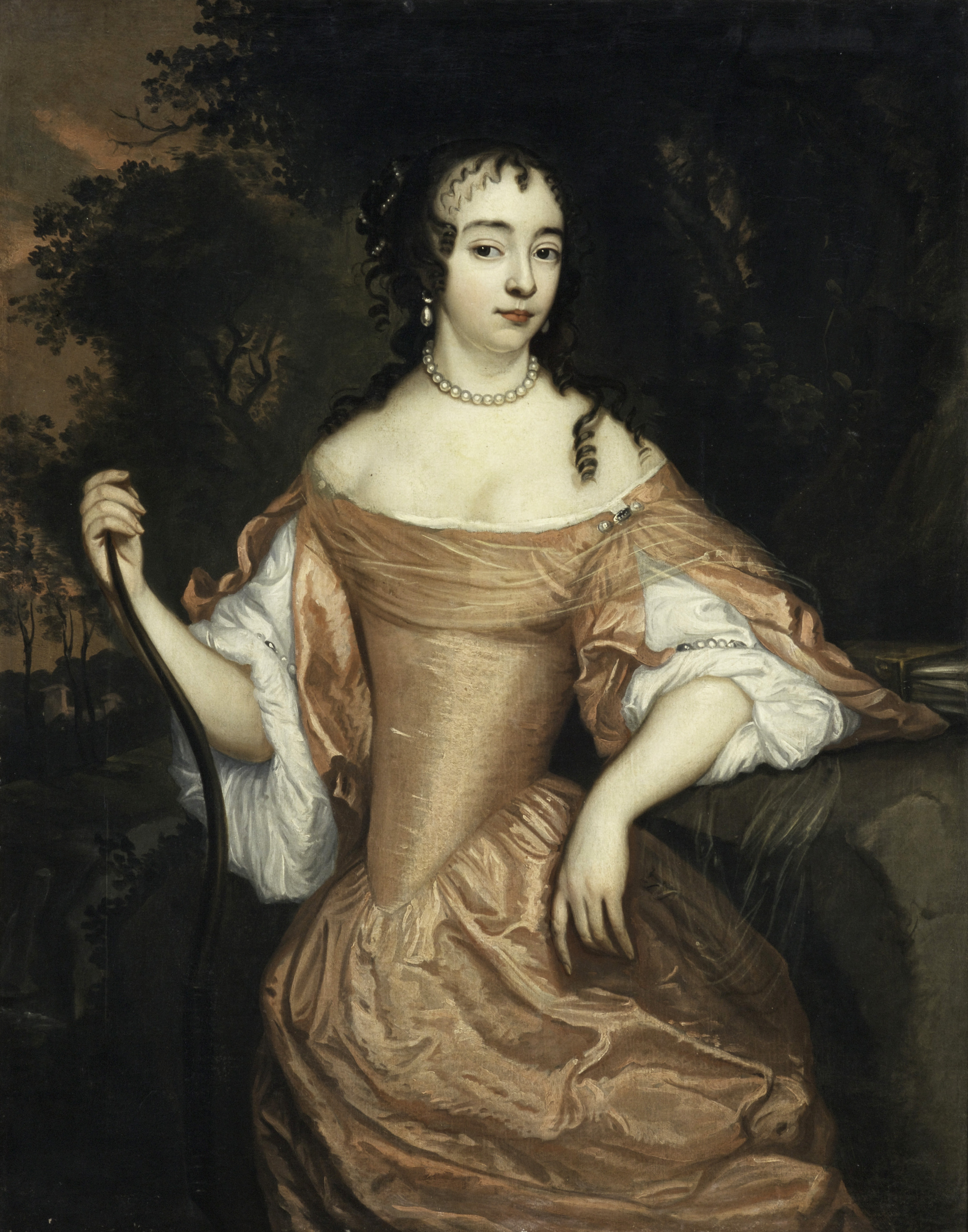
- Maria of Orange-Nassau by Johannes Mytens
- Born: 5 September 1642; The Hague, the Netherlands
- Died: 20 March 1688 (aged 45); Schloss Oranienhof, Germany
- Noble family: House of Nassau
- Spouse: Louis Henry, Count Palatine of Simmern-Kaiserslautern
- Father: Frederick Henry, Prince of Orange
- Mother: Amalia of Solms-Braunfels

Maria of Nassau or Maria of Orange-Nassau (5 September 1642 – 20 March 1688) was a Dutch princess of the house of Orange and by marriage pfalzgräfin or countess of Simmern-Kaiserslautern.

== Life ==
Maria was born in The Hague, the youngest daughter of Amalia of Solms-Braunfels and her husband Frederick Henry, Prince of Orange. Her father was already in his late fifties when she was born and died when she was only four. She was also the aunt of the future William III, via her older brother William II. Since Spain was at war with Portugal and wanted to avoid an Anglo-Portuguese alliance, the Spanish government proposed Princess Maria of Orange-Nassau as a bride for Charles II of England, instead of Catherine of Braganza. However, Charles II dismissed the proposal and chose to establish an anti-Spanish alliance with Portugal and, therefore, he decided to marry Catherine and not Maria. The Orange family also began negotiations for her to marry Charles II of England, but he also refused. A year later marriage negotiations with John Maurice, Prince of Nassau-Siegen began, but these also proved abortive.

On 23 September 1666 in Kleve she married Louis Henry, Count Palatine of Simmern-Kaiserslautern (1640-1674), son of Louis Philip and a grandson of Maria's aunt Countess Louise Juliana of Nassau. Like her sisters' marriages, Maria's marriage was intended to draw the network of Calvinist princes closer together. Maria and Louis Henry were married eight years but the marriage proved childless and on her husband's death the Simmern-Kaiserslautern line died out.

Maria kept up a correspondence with her two surviving sisters after her marriage. Like her sisters Louise Henriette with the Oranienburg, Albertine Agnes with the Oranienstein and Henriette Catherine with Oranienbaum, Maria built herself a new palace after her marriage - she completed hers in 1669 at Bad Kreuznach and named it Schloss Oranienhof. Maria died in 1688 at Kreuznach after six days of pneumonia and Schloss Oranienhof was destroyed by French troops in the Nine Years' War a year later.

== Ancestry ==
Ancestors of Maria of Orange-Nassau

8. William I, Count of Nassau-Siegen
4. William the Silent
9. Juliana of Stolberg
2. Frederick Henry, Prince of Orange
10. Gaspard II de Coligny
5. Louise de Coligny
11. Charlotte de Laval
1. Maria of Orange-Nassau
12. Conrad, Count of Solms-Braunfels
6. John Albert I of Solms-Braunfels
13. Elisabeth of Nassau-Dillenburg
3. Amalia of Solms-Braunfels
14. Louis I, Count of Sayn-Wittgenstein
7. Agnes of Sayn-Wittgenstein
15. Elisabeth of Solms-Laubach
