= Pedro Felipe =

Pedro Felipe may refer to:

- Pedro Felipe (footballer, born 1997), Brazilian footballer
- Pedro Felipe (footballer, born 2004), Brazilian footballer
