= La Raza Nation =

- Founded: 1973
- Founding location: Chicago, Illinois, United States
- Territory: Illinois; Wisconsin; Ohio; Florida; Georgia
- Ethnicity: Hispanic (Mexican or of Central American origin)
- Allies: Folk Nation; Crips; MS-13; Gangster Disciples; Black Disciples; Surenos
- Rivals: People Nation, Almighty Saints, Latin Kings, Maniac Latin Disciples

La Raza Nation is a street gang founded in Chicago in 1973. Their colors are green, white, and red (same as the Mexican flag). Their symbols include the Mexican flag, cross, and a six-point star.

== Relations with other gangs ==
Although La Raza Nation is affiliated with the Folk Nation, La Raza Nation has been to war with many Folk Nation gangs such as Gangster Disciples, and other Folks. Their main rivals are local gangs such as the Almighty Saints, Latin Kings, and Black P. Stones from the Back of the Yards area.

== Activities ==
Activity of La Raza has historically been centered in the Chicago area, but soon expanded to other areas. Immigration from Mexico to the United States saw an uptick in 1980. In 1985, La Raza opened up a noted chapter in West Humboldt Park, adding to the next era of gang culture in the neighborhood.

A 1996 police report noted La Raza as the rival of the Gran Familia Mexicana, a federation of Mexican gangs in the New York City area.

Between 2001 and 2003, La Raza was involved in a gang war with Vatos Locos. In the end, 12 Vatos Locos members were charged in the conspiracy to kill 4 rival gang leaders, including one leader who was sentenced to 151 years for his part in the plan.

In April 2005, 19 suspected members of La Raza were arrested in the Naples, Florida area by federal and local law enforcement. Officials estimated the group's membership at around 100 and noted they'd been in the area since at least 1996.

In July 2005, La Raza was listed by Immigration and Customs Enforcement (ICE) as one of the 54 violent street gangs targeted by ICE in a two-week nationwide enforcement action called Operation Community Shield.

Local officers in Gwinnett County, Georgia have noted the presence of La Raza members in their jurisdiction. ICE officials have arrested La Raza members in the Atlanta area.

A 2005 report produced by the United States Department of Justice noted the presence of La Raza in the western United States, but not at a high level of activity. A total of approximately 17 percent of the law enforcement agencies surveyed nationwide reported a presence of La Raza in their jurisdictions. Just over 6 percent of those agencies reported La Raza activity as moderate to high levels. In 2004 authorities arrested 89 known high ranking members in Naples, FL including the highest ranking Leonel Lopez aka Pitufo attempted murder and narcotics sales.

In 2008, La Raza was documented in Waukesha, Wisconsin.

As of 1985, La Raza has an active chapter in the area around N. Pulaski and Wabansia known as DK-Town. The gang originally claimed Cortland/Kedvale ave, but are now based on Harding/Wabansia. Bloomingdale to North ave, and Keystone to Avers, are within the La Raza chapter known as "DK Town1700".
