= Louis Philip =

Louis Philip may refer to:

- Louis Philip, Count Palatine of Simmern (1602–1655)
- Louis Philip, Count Palatine of Guttenberg (1577–1601)
- Louis Philip of Egmont (1622–1682)

== See also ==
- Louis Philippe (disambiguation)
- Luis Filipe (disambiguation)
