= Amalia of Solms-Braunfels =

Princess of Orange from 1625 to 1647

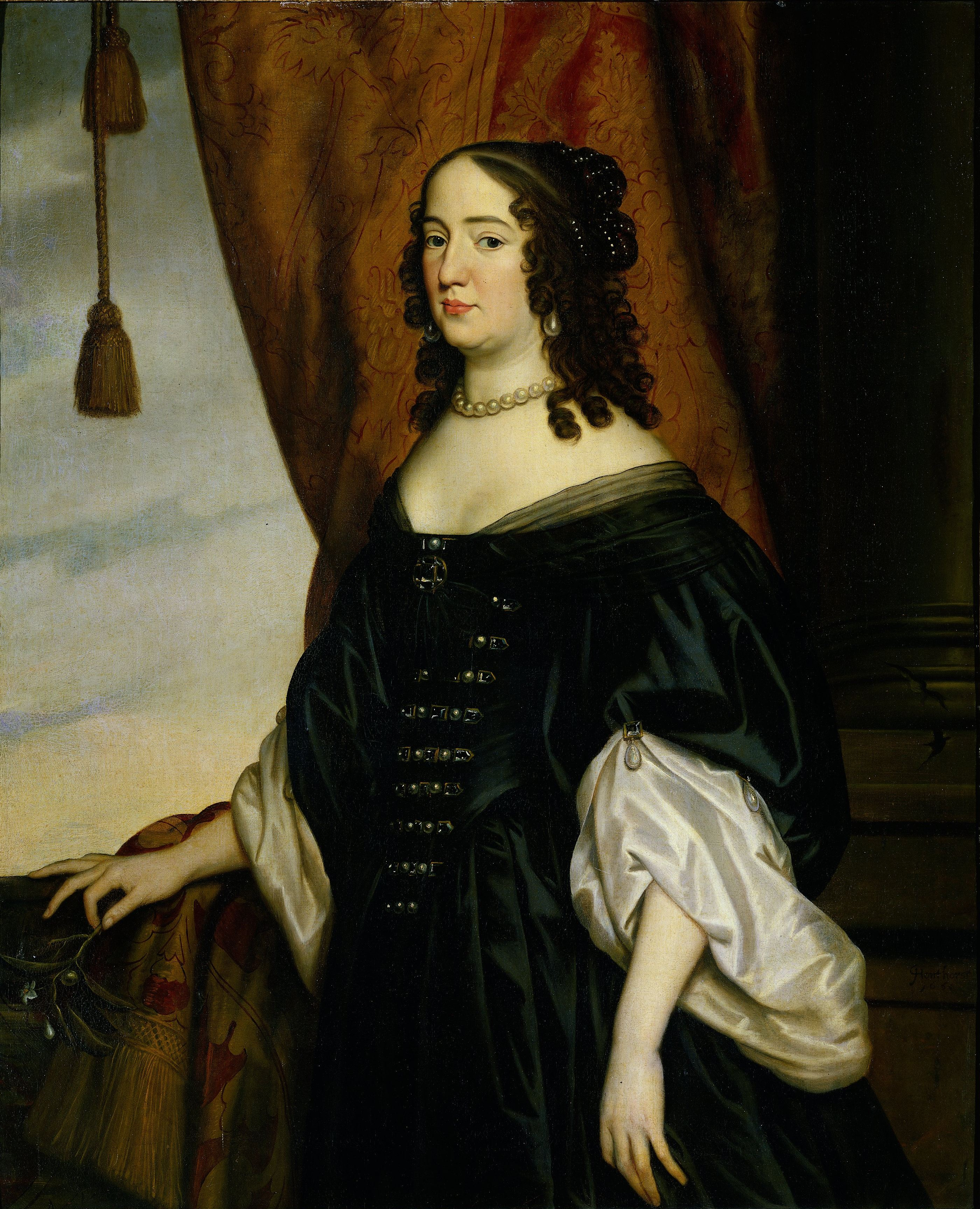
- Portrait by Gerard van Honthorst

Princess consort of Orange
- Tenure: 1625–1647
- Born: 31 August 1602; Braunfels Castle in Braunfels
- Died: 8 September 1675 (aged 73) the Hague
- Spouse: Frederick Henry, Prince of Orange (m. 1625; died 1647)
- Issue: William II, Prince of Orange; Louise Henriette, Duchess of Prussia; Henriette Amalia of Nassau; Elisabeth of Nassau; Isabella Charlotte of Nassau; Albertine Agnes, Countess of Nassau-Dietz; Henriette Catherine, Princess of Anhalt-Dessau; Henry Louis of Nassau; Maria, Countess Palatine of Simmern-Kaiserslautern
- House: Solms-Braunfels
- Father: John Albert I, Count of Solms-Braunfels
- Mother: Countess Agnes of Sayn-Wittgenstein

Amalia of Solms-Braunfels (31 August 1602 – 8 September 1675) was Princess of Orange by marriage to Frederick Henry, Prince of Orange. She acted as the political adviser of her husband during his reign, and acted as his de facto deputy and regent during his infirmity from 1640 to 1647. She also served as chair of the regency council during the minority of her grandson William III, Prince of Orange, from 1650 until 1672.

== Biography ==
=== Early life ===
Amalia was born in Braunfels as a fourth daughter of Imperial Count Johann Albrecht I of Solms-Braunfels (1563-1623) and his wife, Countess Agnes of Sayn-Wittgenstein (1568-1617). She was a member of the House of Solms, a ruling family with Imperial immediacy, and spent her childhood at Braunfels Castle.

She became part of the court of Elizabeth Stuart, Queen of Bohemia, wife of Frederick V of the Palatine, the "Winter King" of Bohemia. After imperial forces defeated Frederick V, she fled from Prague with the pregnant queen to the west. Shelter was denied to them along the way because the emperor forbade it as Frederick had been placed under an Imperial ban. Elizabeth went into labour during their flight and Amalia helped her with her delivery of Prince Maurice at Küstrin castle.

The end of their journey was The Hague, where stadtholder Maurice, Prince of Orange, uncle of the elector gave them asylum in 1621. They often appeared at his court, where Maurice's younger half-brother Frederick Henry, Prince of Orange became infatuated with Amalia in 1622. She refused to become his lover and held out for marriage. The two were closely related, in particular, first cousins once removed.

When Maurice of Nassau died, he made his half-brother Frederick Henry promise to wed. Frederick married Amalia on 4 April 1625.

=== Wife to the Stadtholder ===
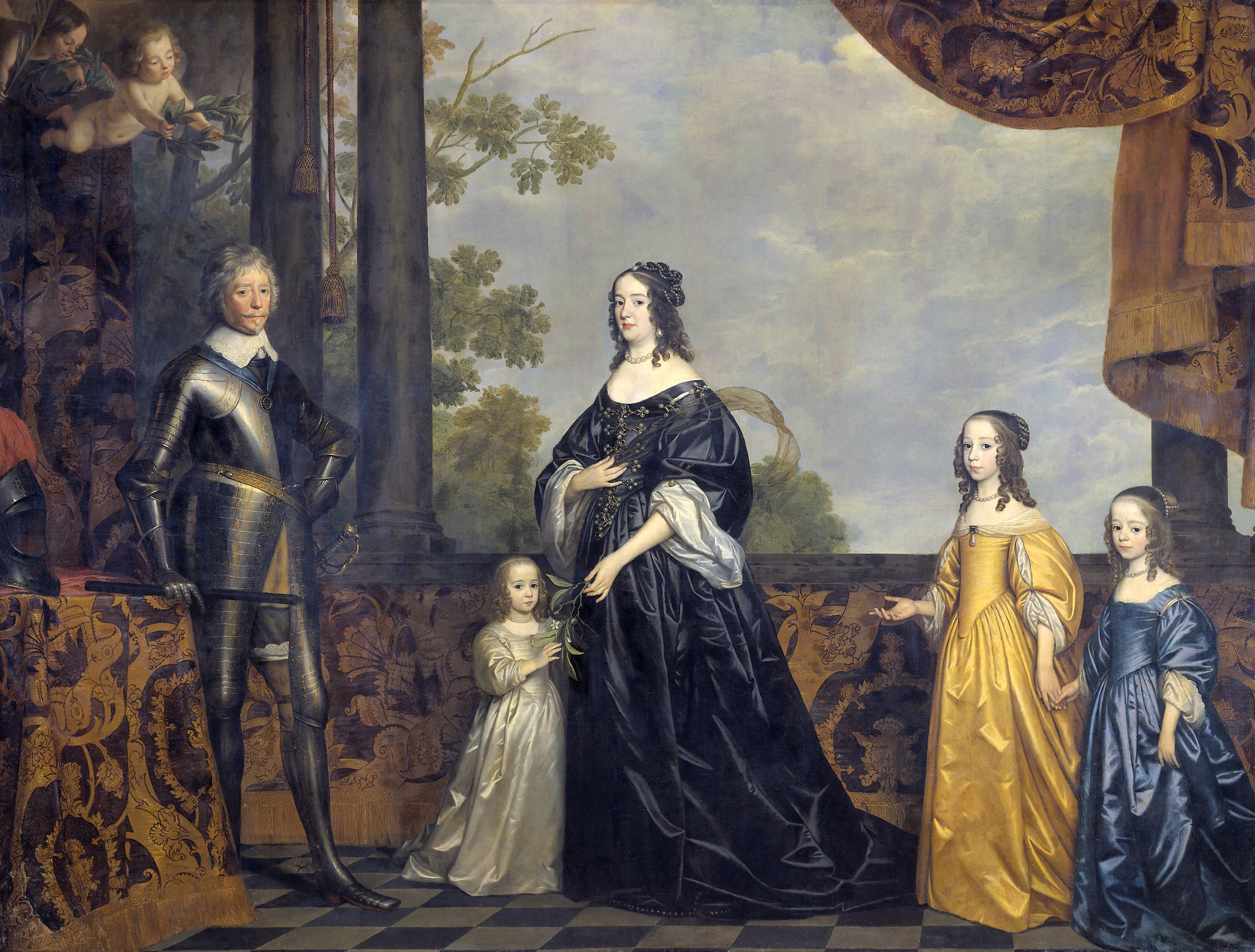
Family portrait by Gerrit van Honthorst, 1647

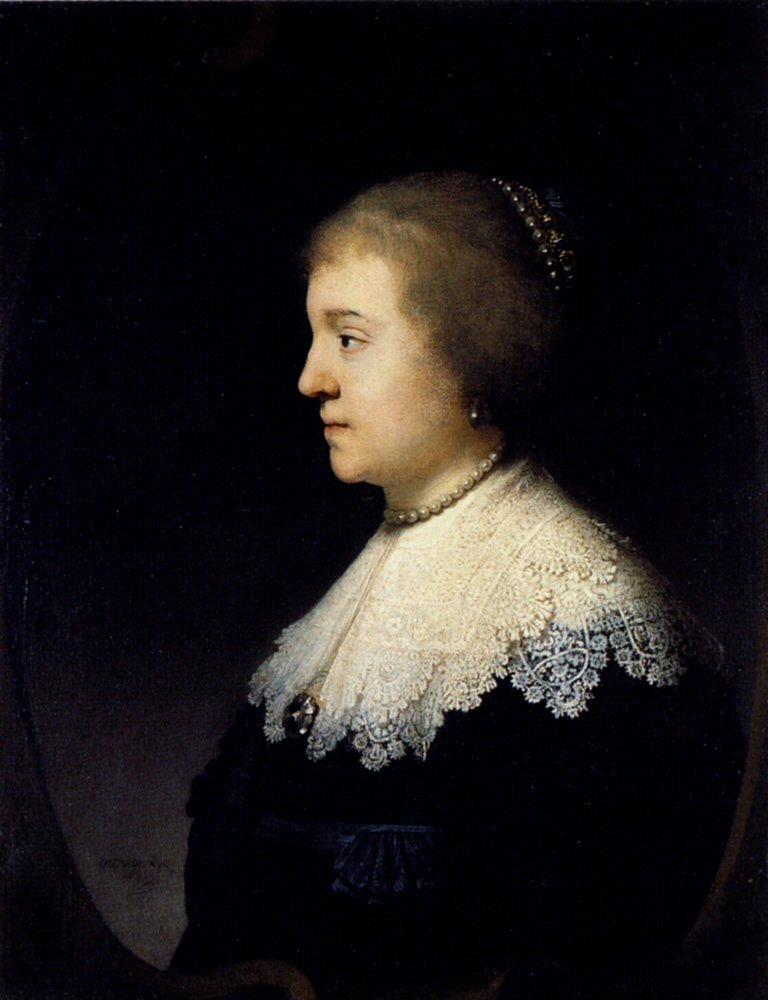
Portrait by Rembrandt van Rijn, 1632

When Frederick Henry became stadtholder after the death of his half-brother Prince Maurice, his influence grew substantially, as did Amalia's. Together Frederick Henry and Amalia succeeded in expanding court life in The Hague. They had several palaces built, including Huis ten Bosch. Amalia was a great collector of art and amassed many jewels, which were inherited by her four surviving daughters. She was described as intelligent, arrogant and ambitious, not beautiful but with a fresh and appealing appearance.

Amalia was the prime mover of several royal marriages, including that of her son William II to Mary, Princess Royal and Princess of Orange (daughter of King Charles I of England) and of their daughters with several German princes.

The relationship between Amalia and Frederik Hendrik was described as happy, and Amalia is acknowledged to have acted as his political adviser. From 1640 until his death in 1647, Frederik Hendrik's health (he suffered from gout and probably also from a form of Alzheimer's) made it increasingly difficult for him to participate in politics, and during these seven years, Amalia therefore effectively functioned as regent and stadtholder, maintaining diplomatic contacts and making political decisions on his behalf. Her de facto political position was acknowledged and diplomats, aware of this, tried to influence her decisions by costly presents. It was reportedly Amalia who was behind Frederik Hendrik's participation in the negotiations which was eventually to result in the Peace of Münster of 1648. As a recognition, King Philip IV of Spain granted her the seigniory and castle of Turnhout in 1649.

In 1647, her spouse died and was succeeded as stadtholder and Prince of Orange by their son William II, Prince of Orange.

=== Regency ===
After the death of her son William II in 1650, her grandson William III (Prince William III of Orange and later also King William III of England) became prince of Orange. A regency council was appointed during his minority, and Amalia and her former daughter-in-law Mary Stuart fought over guardianship and thereby chairmanship of the regency council; the High Court of Holland and Zeeland finally granted both Mary and Amalia shared guardianship, and thereby shared part in the regency council of Orange.

Amalia was supported against Mary by her son-in-law, the Elector of Brandenburg, and she was on good terms with the Grand Pensionary Johan de Witt, a relationship which did not change with the Act of Seclusion of 1654, barring the prince from all ancestral offices. When Mary died in 1660, Amalia in practice took sole control of the regency of her grandson. She maintained good relations to De Witt even by the passing of the 1667 Eternal Edict, which abolished the office of stadholder entirely. During this time she lived in the Oude Hof on the Noordeinde, maintaining her court and diplomatic contacts with royalty.

In 1672, her grandson was declared an adult and his regency council thereby dismissed. Amalia retired and witnessed him becoming stadholder of Holland, Zeeland, Utrecht, Gelderland and Overijssel and captain-general of the Union. She died at her home in The Hague, aged 73.

== Tributes ==
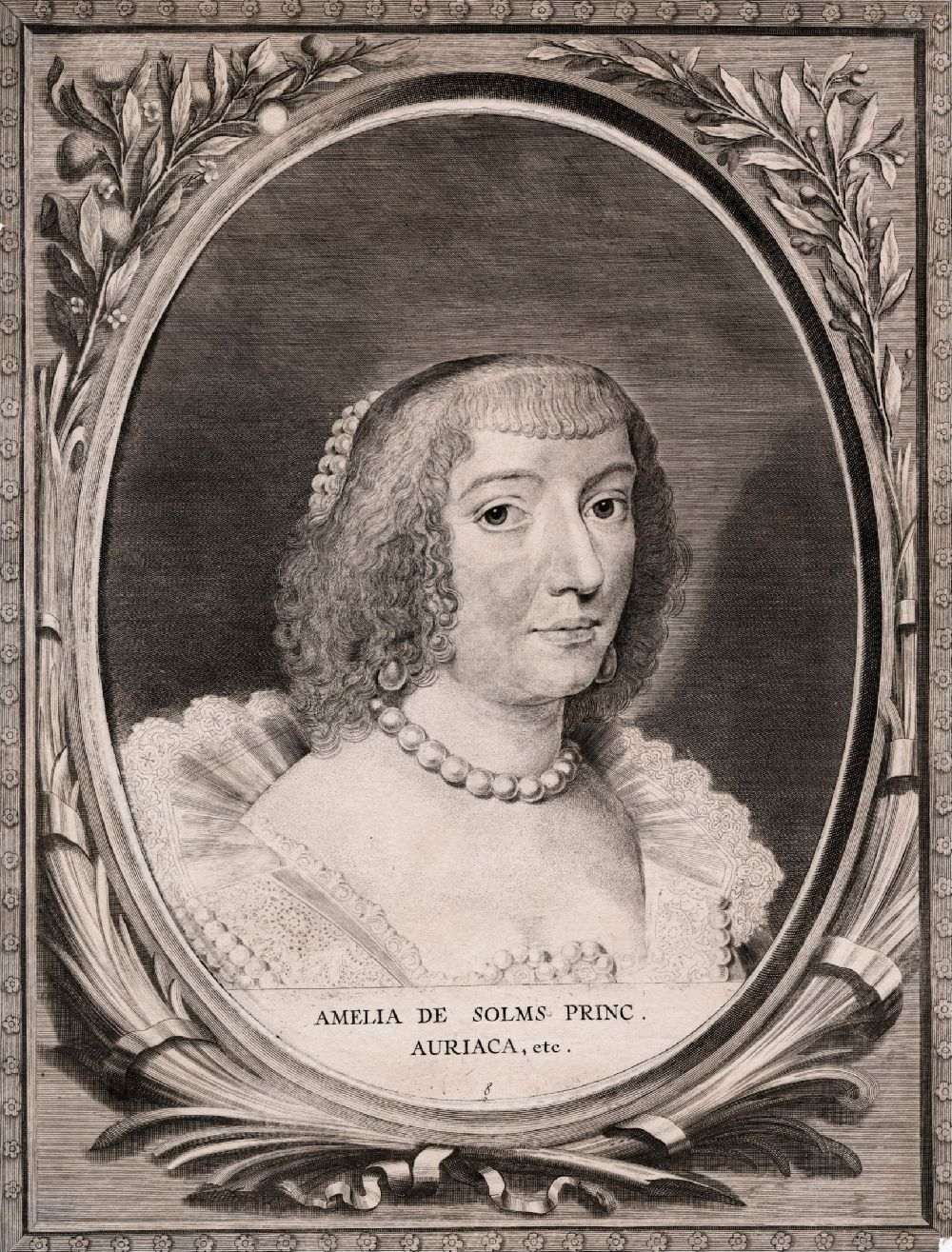
Engraved after Gerrit van Honthorst, Portrait of Amelia de Solms, Princess of Orange, mid 17th century, engraving

A wine from wine estate Solms-Delta in Franschhoek (South Africa) is named after Amalia of Solms-Braunfels. The wine honours the role played by her in Dutch political life. Her grandson, William III, King of England, provided refuge and support to thousands of French Huguenots after the revocation of the Edict of Nantes in 1685. Some 180 of these refugees, fleeing religious persecution, were relocated to the Cape and granted farms in Franschhoek. Here they laid the foundations of the modern South African wine industry.

== Issue ==
- Stadtholder William II (1626–1650), married Mary of England
- Luise Henriette of Nassau (1627–1667), married Frederick William, Elector of Brandenburg
- Henriette Amalia of Nassau (1628), died in infancy
- Elisabeth of Nassau (1630), died shortly after birth
- Isabella Charlotte of Nassau (1632–1642), died in childhood
- Albertine Agnes of Nassau (1634–1696), married William Frederick, Count of Nassau-Dietz
- Henriette Catherine of Nassau (1637–1708), married John George II, Prince of Anhalt-Dessau
- Henry Louis of Nassau (1639), died in infancy
- Maria of Nassau (1642–1688), married Louis Henry Maurice, son of Louis Philip of Palatine-Simmern-Kaiserslautern
