= History of gangs in Humboldt Park =

The Chicago neighborhood of Humboldt Park is the founding grounds for several major gangs, including the Latin Kings, Simon City Royals, and Maniac Latin Disciples, among a number of other gangs with active chapters in the area as of 2023. With its roots dating back to the 1950s, the continuous presence and activity of gangs around the neighborhood has caused it to be a frequent subject of law enforcement, media, and residents over the years.

Several pivotal moments occurred in the neighborhood throughout the 20th century, largely deriving from racial change and resulting tension. Notably, the formation of the Latin Kings in 1954 and the Simon City Royals in 1956, demographic shifts and homeowner fears exacerbated by blockbusting in 1962, the Division Street riots in 1966, and finally the arrival of La Raza Nation in 1985; All in part serving as the impetus for the formation of subsequent gangs and a broader culture that would continue to foster around the neighborhood.

Gang involvement, particularly among youth, has carried on successively down generations, with the 1970s through early 1990s marking an apex of drug dealing and violent crime in Humboldt Park, largely stemming from gang activity. Gentrification in Humboldt Park, particularly on the east side of the neighborhood, began in the 1990s. Around the same time, Chicago Police modified its approach to gang related crime. Gradually, crime began decreasing around the area, with the 2010s experiencing notably diminished violent crime levels, particularly on the east side. However, gangs continue to be active in the area maintaining various chapters, especially on the west side, and will publicly engage in activities such as drilling and tagging. Evidence of present gang activities in the neighborhood is widely available in-person and online.

== History ==
Gangs in Humboldt Park originated in the 1950s, and quickly cascaded across nearly all racial groups in the area over the proceeding years as gang related violence also increased, with a surge in the late 1970s. By the late 1980s/early 1990s, approximately 49 of the 139 gangs active in Chicago operated out of the 14th district, Humboldt Park.

=== Early neighborhood demographic shifts, formation of gangs ===
Humboldt Park had originally been inhabited predominantly by Danish, Swedish, and Norwegians. In the 1920s/1930s, Russians, Polish, Jewish, and Italian residents began moving in as many of the Scandinavians left. In the early 1950s, some of the first Puerto Ricans families began settling in the neighborhood, mostly in West Humboldt Park and areas south of Chicago Avenue including East Garfield Park. These properties had recently become more affordable due to a large influx of black residents in the surrounding area, causing the city and banks to disinvest in the community, in turn diminishing property values. Impoverished Puerto Rican families now had the prospect of being able to move into the neighborhood and live an idyllic middle class life, as had traditionally been the characterization of Humboldt Park since the 1880s. From 1950 to 1960, the Puerto Rican population of Chicago jumped from 255 to 32,371.

==== Latin Kings ====
In 1954, Ramon Santo along with two other boys formed the Latin Kings, which they coined after the Imperials. The group was formed in response to rising discrimination, both from Irish, Italian and Greek groups in the area that harbored "deep anti-Puerto Rican sentiments', as well as stronger Black gangs such as the Clovers, Imperial Chaplins, and the Egyptian Cobras.

Puerto Rican youths here continued to face bullying and harassment from greaser gangs throughout the 1950s and 1960s. They would often be accosted for simply walking through their neighborhood, such as to school. In 1964, through diplomacy spearheaded by King Papo, the Latin Kings merged with the Imperials, among numerous others gangs throughout the city, including the Jokers, 23rd Street Boys, Supreme Cliques, MarKings, and Skulls, to defend their community from discrimination and its right to life. Several of these gangs were white, including the 23rd Street Boys, 26th Street Jokers and Supreme Clique, as well as the Latin Kings of Little Village, which was mostly a white neighborhood at the time.

On Friday May 15th, 1964, the now expanded and more powerful Latin Kings "Officially assembled" in the park itself - "On a sunny Friday afternoon several Puerto Rican gang members and a few full Puerto Rican gangs like the Imperials, Skulls and some others met in Humboldt Park in the actual park." The tenets of the Latin Kings were established to:

1. Protect our families
2. Protect our neighborhoods
3. Protect each other

Division Street, south of the park, soon became a hub for these communities. In 1966, the Division Street riots occurred in protest of continuous discrimination against the Puerto Rican community, most of whom lived on the outer rim of a city they felt took them only for their cheap labor. The widely reported riots prompted the rise of further organizations around the area.

==== Simon City Royals ====
In 1956, a group of mostly fourteen year-old Greasers banded together in response to racial changes taking place around the neighborhood, forming the Simon City Royals. They took their name after Almira Simons Park located at 1640 N. Drake Avenue, where they tended to post up. The original founder and much of the first generation members were said to be Italian, though the gang was not exclusively Italian.

Soon after the inception of the Simon City Royals, other greaser gangs began cropping up around the neighborhood, such as the Jokers and Hirsh Street, causing friction between the groups. For the remainder of the 1950s and very early 1960s, the various greaser groups in this area often competed and fought amongst themselves. The Simon City Royals would ultimately establish themselves as the toughest gang among these groups in the neighborhood in the early 1960s.

In 1962, Simon City opened up recruitment and other white greaser gangs continued to spawn along Chicago avenue, including the Harding Drakers, as Puerto Rican families and gangs moved into the area at an increasing rate. The gang was able to expand rapidly due to anti-Puerto Rican and anti-Latin King sentiment being fairly spread among some of the white youth here. This second generation of Simon City members fought significantly more than the preceding, founding generation, as a result of accelerating changes to the neighborhood, and their opposition to them.

As many of these blocks around West Humboldt Park became increasingly settled by non-white families, realtors quickly capitalized on fear and sentiments of some middle-class white families by employing the use of blockbusting. To much success, fear mongering of depleting home values and redlining had spread considerably causing the exit of many homeowners, as sudden and dramatic changes to the neighborhood further incensed white gangs.

In 1971, white gangs around Chicago formed an alliance or "truce" known as the White Power Organization, in response to continued changes undergone by the "old white neighborhoods, and the increasingly more powerful and growing gangs such as the Latin Disciples, Imperial Gagsters, and Spanish Cobras.

==== Maniac Latin Disciples ====
In 1966, the same year as the Division Street Riots, Albert "Hitler" Hernandez, along with other adolescents around Rockwell/Potomac ave. formed the 'Latin Disciples', under the larger umbrella of the Black Disciples Nation. The Black Disciples Nation was the result of a unification that took place that year involving mostly African American gangs from the South Side.

These founding members of the Latin Disciples did not desire to become Latin Kings, though they had family members who were. Persistent harassment from greaser gangs motivated them to open the group, and to gain entry into the Disciple Nation. In 1968, the Latin Disciples began recruiting all races. They had been known for defending residents, particularly youth, against bullying from other local gangs, such as the Latin Kings, Warlords, and Spanish Lords, causing strife between them and these other gangs. That previous winter, eleven members, including Albert Hernandez, had been pictured in the paper during a fierce blizzard in 1967 after voluntarily shoveling the neighborhood for residents.

In 1972, the founder, Albert Hernandez, was hanging out on their usual longtime corner of Rockwell/Potomac ave, when two Latin Kings strolled through the area. Hernandez asked them to remove their colors as they were in MLD territory, and a conflict ensued. Hernandez would ultimately end up getting stabbed to death. He was 18 years old. The incident launched gang warfare between the gangs, and the Latin King who killed the popular Hernandez quickly became known to the street, and his death would be quickly avenged as the killer would soon be shot and murdered, in part by aid of the Milwaukee Kings.

In 1976, the gang opened a chapter in West Humboldt Park at the corner of Division & Avers, and quickly spread from there to Washtenaw/Hirsch and Talman/Wabansia (T-Dubb). Around this time in the mid-late 1970s, the Latin Disciples came to dominate the drug trade, specifically relating to heroin. This allowed the gang to expand exponentially, thanks in part to their newfound allegiance with other powerful gangs like the Spanish Cobras, and entry into the Folk Nation in 1978. In 1979, numerous members between the Disciples and Cobras were busted at various street corners including Washtenaw/Hirsch, Evergreen/Wastenaw, and the infamous Rockwell/Potomac intersection, where police said "you could buy any drug". Once released from jail following their arrests, members would simply set operations back up at the same locations.

=== 1980s–1990s ===
Several continuous decades of gang activity in the neighborhood led to membership becoming nearly a mandate, or basic way of life for many of the youth here by the 1980s/1990s. For some, it helped fill certain voids as many lacked resources at home and a support network. Gangs were also a means of protection. Widespread and stark division lines drawn by gangs throughout Humboldt would prevent kids from walking through or going to various public locations. Many of these youth came from parents who had also been members of gangs when they grew up in the neighborhood.

In the mid-late 1980s, the neighborhood continued to evolve. It had also collected a reputation taken note of by Chicago Police; By this point, 49 of the 139 gangs running in Chicago were out of the 14th district, Humboldt Park.

In the early 1990s, gang-related violence in the neighborhood spiked, some of which stemmed from an ongoing two-year long deadly feud between the Latin Disciples and Imperial Gangsters. A nine-day gang war occurred in the neighborhood between the groups in October–November 1992, which resulted in 25 shootings catching the attention of media. The Chicago Tribune ran an article on the matter interviewing various CPD officials, professors from the University of Chicago, and community members. It also included interviews with gang experts from UChicago and the author of a study by the Illinois Criminal Justice Information Authority, which analyzed gang-related crimes in Chicago from 1987 to 1990, discussing differences between the various gangs - "Higher rates of violence and more lethal violence in Latino gangs" contrasting from "Black gangs tended to commit more of what researchers call ''instrumental'' violence, where the motive is money or property. They said Hispanic gangs commit more ''expressive'' violence, where the violence is the motive". CPD Police Commander, Robert Dart, denoted that "many Hispanic groups are much smaller, newer and less structured than the black gangs" and concluded that ultimately, gang involvement and related activities were an issue of adolescence: "The gang problem is a young adolescent problem...The black community is aging, while there are more Hispanic young people and more Hispanic people overall.''

==== Entrance of La Raza nation ====
In 1980, an influx of Mexican migration into the United States occurred, with many immigrants making their way to Chicago. In 1985, La Raza expanded considerably around the city opening up several new chapters. The chapter established in West Humboldt Park had once been described as being one of the most "legendary" in the nation.

The gang originally claimed Cortland/Kedvale ave, but are now based on Harding/Wabansia. Bloomingdale to North Ave, and Keystone to Avers, are within the La Raza chapter known as "DK Town1700".

==== Law enforcement activities ====
Undercover narcotics units heavily targeted Humboldt Park in the 1980s, making 180 drug buys during a single one-year investigation alone, which concluded in 1986.

===== Operation Pot-Rock =====
In the 1980s, the corner of Potomac Avenue and Rockwell Street, east of Humboldt Park, had become a "notorious drug-peddling location" known colloquially as the 'Twilight Zone'. Chicago Police had known about it for at least six years. In July 1980, CPD arrested 46 on charges of selling drugs at several locations, including Potomac and Rockwell. At the time, it was the "largest roundup of suspected drug peddlers in the city`s history".

Between 1985 and 1986, Chicago police pursued an undercover narcotics investigation of the street corner, coined "Operation Pot-Rock". Where the investigation got its name is two-fold; Pot was short for Potomac ave, while Roc was short for Rockwell st. - The investigation focused on pot and crack (rock), among other drugs.

In total, the one-year long investigation yielded 94 indictments, 34 being the subject of gang members charged with selling drugs on Potomac between Rockwell and California Avenue. During the investigation, undercover agents described having to frequently wait in line behind other customers to purchase narcotics:

"...undercover agents often had to wait in line behind other customers to make the buys. Agents once found their car was the 13th in a line of autos waiting for curbside service"

== See also ==
- Gangs in Chicago
