= Filipe =

- Gender: Male

Origin
- Origin: Greek

Filipe is a common first name in Portuguese-speaking countries. It is a Portuguese and Galician spelling of the name Philip (aka Phillip) (the name is spelled Felipe in Spanish and in archaic Portuguese orthography).

== Famous Filipes ==
=== Royalty ===
There are several Spanish kings who were named Felipe. The three Felipes that also ruled over Portugal were known in Portugal as Filipe (with an "i"):

- Filipe I of Portugal (II of Spain)
- Filipe II of Portugal (III of Spain)
- Filipe III of Portugal (IV of Spain)

=== Sports ===
- Filipe Luís (born 1985), Brazilian footballer
- Filipe Andrade Félix (born 1985), Brazilian-Polish footballer
- Filipe Gomes Ribeiro (born 1987), Brazilian footballer
- Filipe Gonçalves dos Santos (born 1998), Brazilian footballer
- Filipe Marques (born 1998), Portuguese paratriathlete

=== Other ===
- Filipe Nery Xavier (1801–1875), Goan-Português administrator and historian
- Elder Filipe (born 1982), Namibian politician
