= Eleanor of Prussia =

Princess of the Duch of Prussia (1583–1607)

- Born: 21 August 1583; Königsberg
- Died: 9 April 1607 (aged 23); Cölln
- Buried: Berlin Cathedral
- Noble family: House of Hohenzollern
- Spouse: Joachim Frederick, Elector of Brandenburg (m. 1603)
- Issue: Marie Eleonore of Brandenburg
- Father: Albert Frederick, Duke of Prussia
- Mother: Marie Eleonore of Cleves

Eleanor of Prussia (German: Eleonore von Preußen; 21 August 1583 – 9 April 1607) was a princess of the Duchy of Prussia by birth and Electress of Brandenburg by marriage.

== Life ==
Eleanor was the fourth daughter of Albert Frederick of Prussia (1553–1618), from his marriage to Marie Eleonore (1550–1608), daughter of Duke William "the Rich" of Jülich-Cleves-Berg. The princess grew up with her sisters in Königsberg Castle.

She married Joachim Frederick, Elector of Brandenburg (1546–1608), in Berlin on 2 November 1603 as his second wife. They married for political reasons: on the one hand, Joachim Frederick hoped to strengthen his influence on Prussia, where he acted as regent for Eleanor's insane father; on the other hand, he hoped to gain control of Jülich-Cleves-Berg, Eleanor's maternal inheritance.

Eleanor died at the age of 23 shortly after giving birth to her only child. She was buried on 26 April 1607 in the family crypt of the House of Hohenzollern in the Berlin Cathedral.

== Children ==
From her marriage Eleanor had one daughter, Marie Eleonore, who married Count Palatine Louis Philip, Count Palatine of Simmern-Kaiserslautern in 1631.

== References and sources ==
- Friederike Bornhak: Eleonora von Preussen: Kurfürstin von Brandenburg, zweite Gemahlin des kurfürsten Joachim Friedrich von Brandenburg, geboren 1583, gestorben 1607, S. Geibel, 1889
- Brozat, Dieter: Der Berliner Dom, Berlin, 1985, ISBN 3-7759-0271-6
- Ernst Daniel Martin Kirchner: Die Kurfürstinnen und Königinnen auf dem Throne der Hohenzollern, part 2: Die letzten acht Kurfürstinnen, Berlin, 1867, pp. 107-130 (with a portrait of Eleanor of Prussia).

Eleanor of Prussia House of Hohenzollern Born: 21 August 1583 Died: 9 April 1607
German nobility
| Vacant Title last held by Catherine of Brandenburg-Küstrin | Electress consort of Brandenburg; 23 October 1603 – 9 April 1607 | Vacant Title next held by Anna of Prussia |
