= Felipe López =

Felipe López may refer to:

- Felipe Molas López (1901–1954), former president of Paraguay
- Felipe López (cyclist) (born 1969), Guatemalan Olympic cyclist
- Felipe López (basketball) (born 1974), retired Dominican basketball player
- Felipe López (archer) (born 1977), Spanish archer
- Felipe López (baseball) (born 1980), Puerto Rican baseball infielder
- Felipe López (footballer) (born 1995), Mexican footballer
- Felipe López (author) (fl. 2017-present), Mexican Zapotec-language poet and scholar
