= My Bloody Life =

Autobiography by Reymundo Sanchez

My Bloody Life: The Making of a Latin King is an autobiography by Reymundo Sanchez (a pseudonym) about his life as a teenage street gang member in Chicago.

The author of the book, Reymundo Sanchez, was a lost boy - disowned by physically abusive step-fathers who could not care less about him or his mother. He soon learned that street survival for himself depended on whom he counted on among his friends and to which gang he belonged in the Humboldt Park community.

Living in the first floor of a slum apartment on the corner intersection streets of Kedzie and Armitage, Reymundo's neighborhood was a stronghold of the Almighty Latin Kings Queens Nation. Initiated into the Latin Kings by performing his first hit at the age of 12, he earned a reputation for violence, armed robbery, burglary, attempted murder, drug dealing, and gangbanging.

A 30-block area of Chicago defined his reality of the world as a child, a minor, then a seasoned gang leader who aligned himself with fellow gang leaders from the Spanish Lords and Insane Unknowns to form an alliance against the Folks Nation that included the Maniac Latin Disciples, Insane Spanish Cobras and Orchestra Albany.

Raymundo was inducted into his gang by a timed "beat down", and once inducted, any perceived breach of the gang's ever-changing laws resulted in a "violation", or punishment by the gang. Following numerous arrests, jail time in Cook County Corrections, and attempted murders against him, Raymundo would walk away from gang life and escape Chicago leaving his bloody life behind.

My Bloody Life is the story of Raymundo’s odyssey through the ranks of the Latin Kings, one of America's largest and most violent Latino gangs, and the insanity, and the heartache that came with it.

Sanchez followed My Bloody Life with Once A King, Always A King, which narrated his life after leaving the Latin Kings.
