= Schloss Oranienhof =

Coordinates: 49.8373°N 7.8533°E

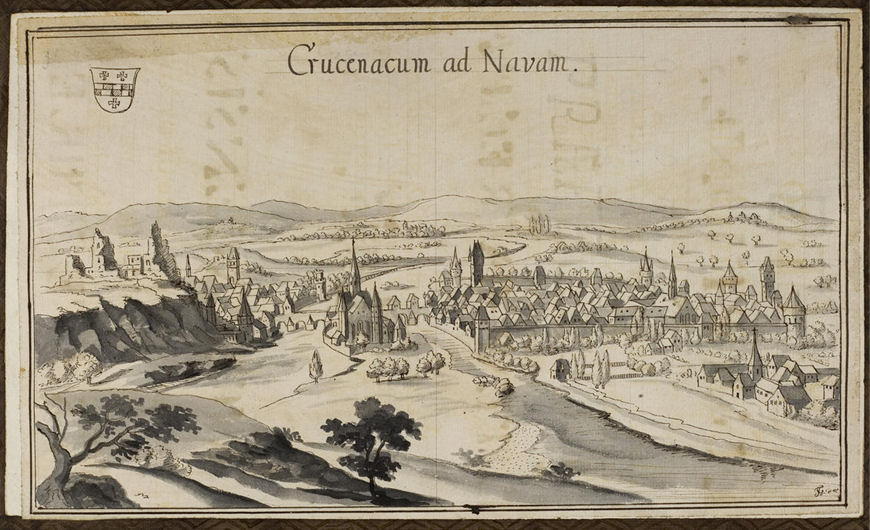
St Peter's Church and the Oranienhof in the foreground of Crucenacum ad Navam, a 1747 drawing by Theodor Gottfried Thum after earlier sketches and engravings.

Schloss Oranienhof was a baroque schloss or palace in what is now Bad Kreuznach in the Rhineland-Palatinate. It was built in 1669 by Maria of Orange-Nassau (1642–1688) as a summer residence on the site of the abandoned Augustiner-Chorfrauenstift. The palace was destroyed by French troops twenty years later during the Nine Years' War, rebuilt in the 18th century and partly demolished in the early 19th century. It was occupied by the house of Orange-Nassau.

== Bibliography ==
- Gotthelf Huyssen: Die Heidenmauer und das christliche Kreuznach. In: ders.: Zur christlichen Alterthumskunde in ihrem Verhältniß zur heidnischen. Vorträge und Studien. J. H. Maurer / Fr. Wohlleben, Kreuznach 1870, S. 317–356
