= St. Quintin's Church, Mainz =

Church in Mainz, Germany

Coordinates: 50°00′03″N 8°16′20″E

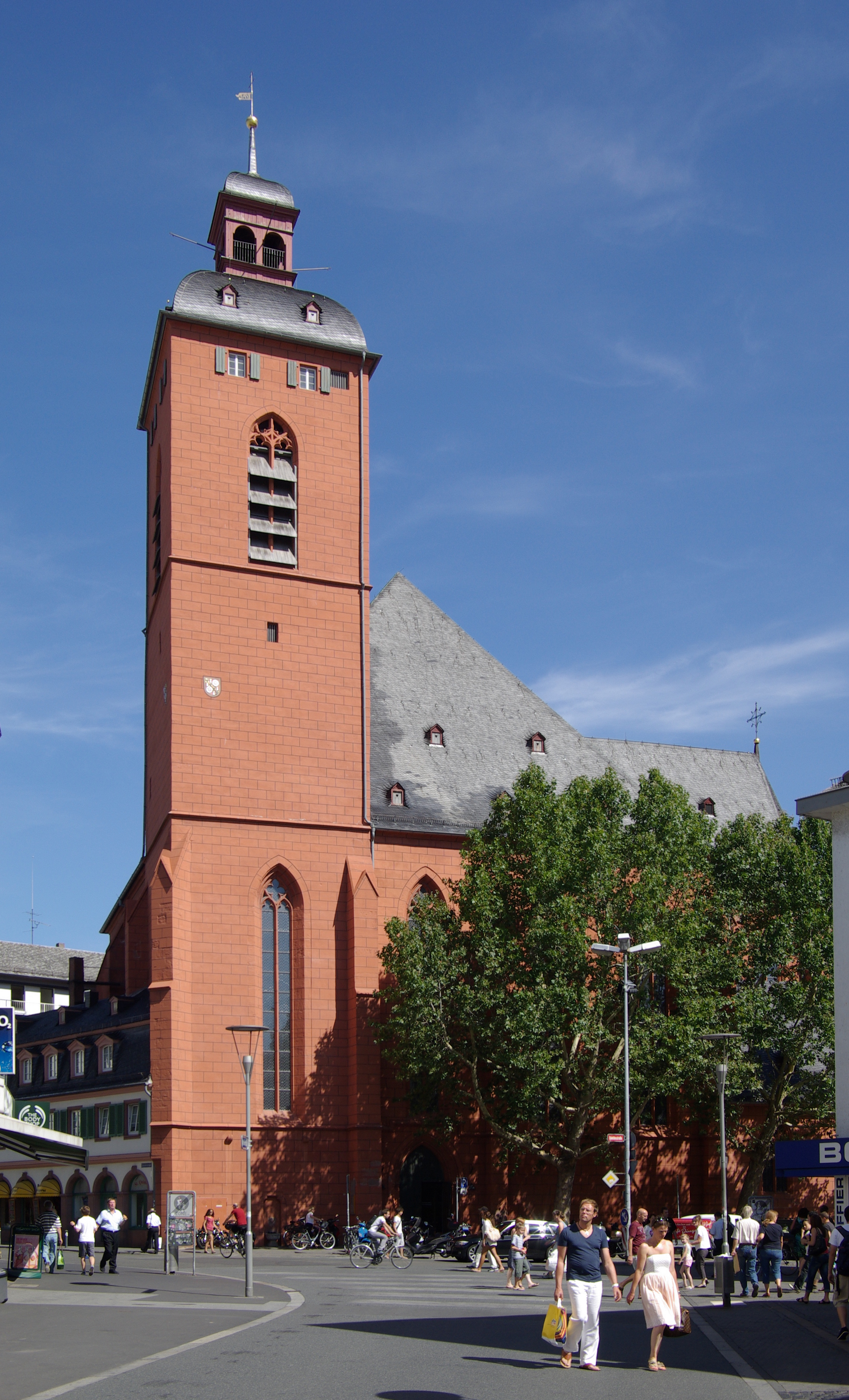
St. Quintin from the south

The Catholic church of St. Quintin is the parish church of the oldest proven parish in the city of Mainz. Today, St. Quintin together with the cathedral community of St. Martin forms the parish of St. Martin's Cathedral and St. Quintin. Thus the cathedral priest is therefore always the priest of St. Quintin as well.

== History ==
The origins of the parish probably date back to the time of the Merovingian dynasty, as evidenced by the patronage of Saint Quintin, which was later almost forgotten. The second patron saint of the church is Saint Blaise, of whom St. Quintin had a head reliquary. St. Quintin was first mentioned in a document in 774. Later, the first inner-city parish cemetery was located near the church (first mention in sources around 1100). It is regarded as certain that St. Quintin already existed in the 8th century; in the 7th and 8th centuries an extensive church building activity had begun in Mainz. Today's construction began around 1288 and was completed around 1330 in Gothic art. As early as 1348, this building suffered severe damage when a fire, set during a plague pogrom, spread from the nearby Jewish quarter to the church, which destroyed the windows of the nave and melted down the city bell in the tower. Starting 1425 the damage could be repaired. The chapel extension south of the choir with the old sacristy (today's storeroom) was built as well. During the Thirty Years' War the church served as a barracks for the Swedish troops. At times evangelical church services were held there. In 1721 the church was completely redesigned baroque and re-equipped. In 1813 the church served again as barracks, this time for the French troops after the Battle of Leipzig. The church underwent a fundamental renovation and repair from 1869 to 1888, after it had been rescued by master builder Eduard Kreyßig from imminent demolition due to dilapidation. The church was furnished in neo-Gothic style. Only the neo-Gothic choir barriers on both sides of the nave have survived from this phase. During the Second World War, the church was severely damaged during the air raids on Mainz in 1942, but the walls were preserved. The valuable arm relic of Saint Quintin was burnt, as were other precious pieces of equipment. The reconstruction and renovation began immediately. A provisional roof was put on during the war and already in 1948 the church could be used again. After the war, it served as a church room for the French garrison. A new relic of Quintin could be worshipped again since 4 November 1950 at the mediation of the bishop of Soisson Pierre Auguste Marie Joseph Douillard. At the end of the 1960s, work was carried out on the exterior and on the bell tower, whereby the church building was given its medieval colouring again in 1970 on the basis of original findings. However, the tower continued to have a provisional roof. It was not until 1995, that the Renaissance tower helmet, reconstructed by hand true to the original, was reattached.

== Architecture ==
The Gothic new building of St. Quintin was built in place of a predecessor, whose shape is unknown and of which no visible remains of construction have survived. The present church consists of an almost square three-nave hall longhouse (see also Hall Church) with three bays. The southwesternmost bay carries the massive bell tower of the church. To create an almost square ground plan for the tower, the southern side aisle is only about half as wide as the central nave. In the tower there is a tower apartment, which was built in 1489 under Elector Berthold von Henneberg. From here, practically the entire city area of the old "wooden" Mainz could be overlooked. Until the 20th century it served as a fire observation station for the city. The windows of the apartment of the tower watch guard are fitted with green shutters. The oldest part of the building, as can be seen from the tracery figures, is the single-nave choir, on the south side of which there is the sacristy. On the north side there is a two-bay Chapel of the Holy Cross. The entrance portal is also on the south side. The building on the west wall of the church, which emerged from medieval booths, is of great urban significance. The exterior is brick-red with painted joints.

== Cemetery ==
The former churchyard, today part of the grounds of the municipal old people's home, can no longer be experienced as such. On the north wall of the church there are several gravestones which were discovered in 1883 in the floor of the church and placed there, leading to severe weathering damage. Until the Second World War, a baroque cemetery portal adorned the entrance link to Schusterstraße. The sandstone portal with the both patrons and Maria together was destroyed by a direct bomb hit.

== Organ ==
Since 2012, the gallery has housed an English-romantic organ from the renowned Nelson organ workshop in Northwest England. Built in Durham, England, in 1906 for the now suspended Wooley Terrace Chapel at Stanley Crook and restored and expanded by the organ builder Elmar Krawinkel & Sohn, the organ now has 23 stops, divided into two manuals and pedal. With its simple neo-Gothic oak facade, the historic instrument manages with a small footprint on the newly erected wooden gallery from 2003. During the restoration, the Nelson organ was extended by seven stops in two new side prospectuses, whereby historical English pipes (formerly in St George's Hanover Square Church) were used and no historical substance was destroyed on the organ. The organ has the following disposition:

I Manual, Great Organ C–c^{4}
| Open diapason | 8′ |
| Dulciana | 8′ |
| Hohl flute | 8′ |
| Principal | 4′ |
| Piccolo | 2′ |
| Twelfth* | 3′ |
| Mixtur 2rangs* | 4′ |
| Trumpet* | 16′ |
| Trumpet | 8′ |

II. Manual, Swell Organ C–c^{4}
| Violin diapason | 8′ |
| Voix celeste | 8′ |
| Viol d'orchestra | 8′ |
| Lieblich gedact | 8′ |
| Gemshorn | 4′ |
| Trumpet | 8′ |
| Oboe | 8′ |
Tremulant

Pedal C–f^{1}
| Accustic Bass* | 32′ |
| Open diapason* | 16′ |
| Bordun | 16′ |
| Open Bass* | 8′ |
| Bass Flute | 8′ |
| Trumpet* | 16′ |
| Trumpet* | 8′ |

Couplers

Swell to Great
Swell sub octave
Swell super octave
Swell to Pedal
Great to Pedal

*new stop

== Bibliography ==
- J. Baum: Drei Mainzer Hallenkirchen. Freiburg, 1906
- August Schuchert: Die Mainzer Kirchen und Kapellen. Verlag Johann Falk 3. Söhne, Mainz 1931
