= Sophia of Legnica =

Sophie of Legnica
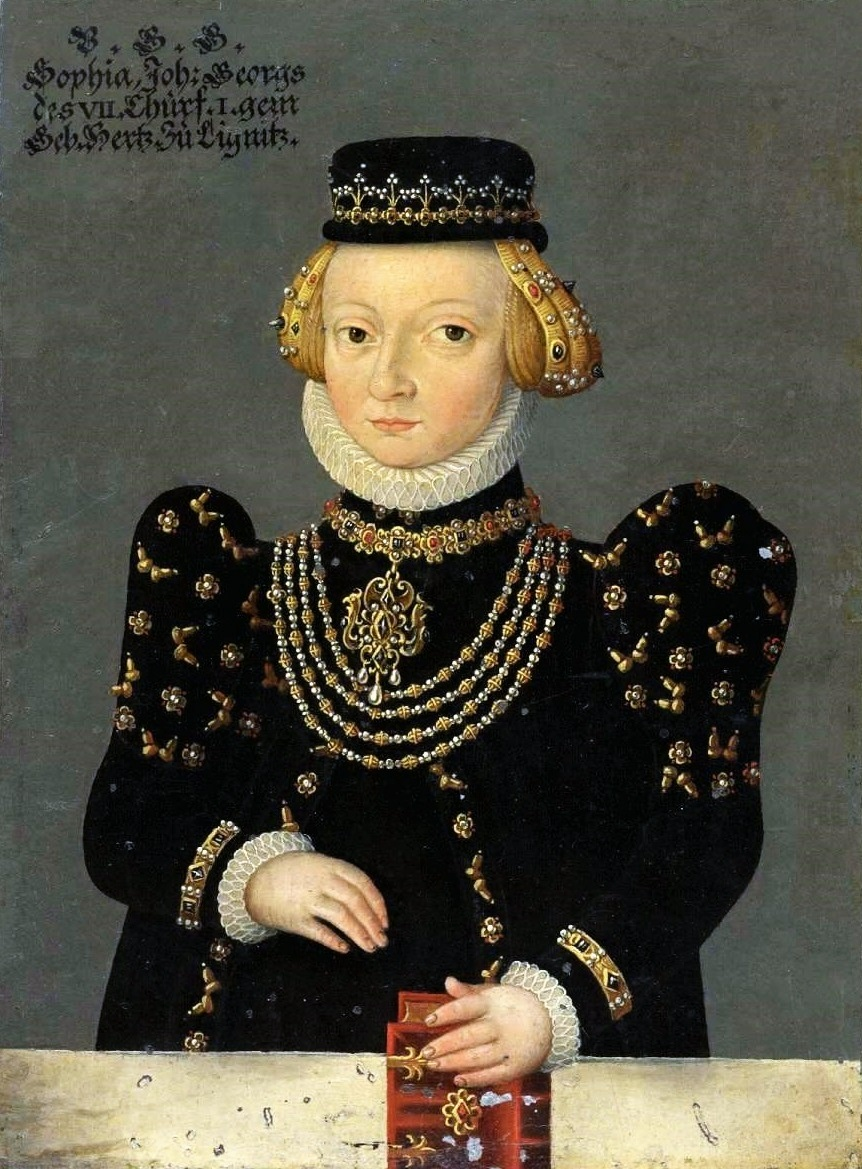
- Born: 1525
- Died: 6 February 1546 (aged 20–21)
- Spouse: John George, Elector of Brandenburg
- Issue: Joachim Frederick, Elector of Brandenburg
- House: Silesian Piast
- Father: Frederick II of Legnica
- Mother: Sophie of Brandenburg-Ansbach-Kulmbach

Princess Sophie of Legnica (1525 – 6 February 1546) was the wife and consort of the Elector of Brandenburg.

== Early life ==
Born into the House of Schlesien-Piast, she was the daughter of Frederick II, Duke of Legnica, Brzeg, and Wohlau, and his second wife, Sophie of Brandenburg-Ansbach-Kulmbach (1485 – 1537).

== Biography ==
Sophie, who was brought up as a Protestant, married the future Elector John George of Brandenburg on 15 February 1545. She died before he acceded to the Electorate and never reigned as Electress of Brandenburg. Her son (and only child) Joachim Frederick did, however, accede to the Electorate in 1598.
