= Felipinho (footballer, born 2002) =

Brazilian footballer

Personal information
- Full name: Felipe José Almeida da Rocha
- Date of birth: 18 July 2002 (age 24)
- Place of birth: Volta Redonda, Brazil
- Position: Forward

Team information
- Current team: Avaí
- Number: 38

Youth career
- 2018–2020: Flamengo
- 2020: → Avaí (loan)
- 2020–2022: Avaí

Senior career*
Years	Team	Apps	(Gls)
2022–	Avaí	7	(0)
- * Club domestic league appearances and goals as of 18:48, 7 February 2023 (UTC)

Felipe José Almeida da Rocha (born 18 July 2002), commonly known as Felipinho, is a Brazilian footballer who plays as a forward for Avaí.

== Club career ==
Born in Volta Redonda, Rio de Janeiro, Felipinho joined Flamengo's youth setup in 2018. In 2020, he was loaned to Avaí, later signing a permanent deal with the club.

On 23 May 2022, Felipinho renewed with Avaí until July 2024. He made his first team – and Série A – debut on 5 November, coming on as a second-half substitute for Marcinho in a 1–1 away draw against Santos.

== Career statistics ==
As of 7 February 2023

Club	Season	League			State League		Cup		Continental		Other		Total	
Club	Season	Division	Apps	Goals	Apps	Goals	Apps	Goals	Apps	Goals	Apps	Goals	Apps	Goals
Avaí	2022	Série A	2	0	—		0	0	—		—		2	0
Avaí	2023	Série B	0	0	5	0	0	0	—		—		5	0
Career total			2	0	5	0	0	0	0	0	0	0	7	0
