= Felipe Vasques =

Brazilian politician (born 1992)

Member of the Legislative Assembly of Ceará
- Incumbent
- Assumed office 1 February 2027

Personal details
- Born: 31 May 1992 (age 34)
- Party: Brazilian Social Democracy Party

Felipe Mikael Vasques Monteiro (born 31 May 1992) is a Brazilian politician who was elected member of the Legislative Assembly of Ceará in 2026. He has served as speaker of the Municipal Chamber of Juazeiro do Norte since 2025.
