= Felipe Banguero =

Colombian footballer (born 1988)

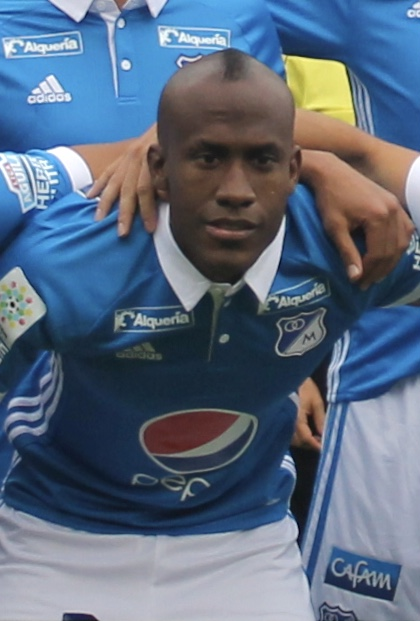

Personal information
- Full name: Felipe Banguero Millán
- Date of birth: 31 December 1988 (age 37)
- Place of birth: Medellín, Colombia
- Height: 1.80 m (5 ft 11 in)
- Position: Defender

Senior career*
Years	Team	Apps	(Gls)
2012–2015	Deportivo Rionegro	97	(1)
2015	→ Alianza Petrolera (loan)	38	(0)
2016	Deportivo Cali	22	(0)
2017–2021	Millonarios	103	(0)
2022	Once Caldas	6	(0)
2022	Águilas Doradas	3	(0)
- * Club domestic league appearances and goals

Felipe Banguero Millán (born 31 December 1988) is a Colombian former professional footballer who played as defender.
