= Filipe (footballer, born 1985) =

Brazilian footballer

Personal information
- Full name: Filipe Andrade Félix
- Date of birth: 7 February 1985 (age 41)
- Place of birth: Ipatinga, Brazil
- Height: 1.79 m (5 ft 10 in)
- Position: Defender

Youth career
- Vasco da Gama
- –2003: Brescia

Senior career*
Years	Team	Apps	(Gls)
2003–2005	Górnik Zabrze	46	(1)
2006–2007	Zagłębie Lubin	21	(0)
2008–2009	Odra Opole	40	(0)
2009	Polonia Słubice	15	(0)
2010	GKS Jastrzębie	14	(0)
2010–2012	Czarni Żagań	47	(1)
2013–2014	LZS Piotrówka	38	(2)
2014–2015	Górnik Wałbrzych	14	(0)
2015	Swornica Czarnowąsy	17	(1)
2015–2016	Brandenburger SC Süd	18	(1)
2016	Śląsk Łubniany	5	(0)
2021–2022	LZS Starowice	0	(0)
Total		285	(6)
- * Club domestic league appearances and goals

Filipe Andrade Félix (born 7 February 1985), commonly known as Filipe, is a Brazilian former professional footballer who played as a defender.

== Club career ==
Filipe spent most of his footballing career in Poland, representing Górnik Zabrze in the Ekstraklasa, before moving on to lower division sides.

In February 2015, Filipe left Górnik Wałbrzych. Later the same month, he signed with Swornica Czarnowąsy.

== Honours ==
Zagłębie Lubin

- Ekstraklasa: 2006–07
