= Joachim Frederick, Elector of Brandenburg =

Elector of Brandenburg from 1598 to 1608

Joachim Frederick
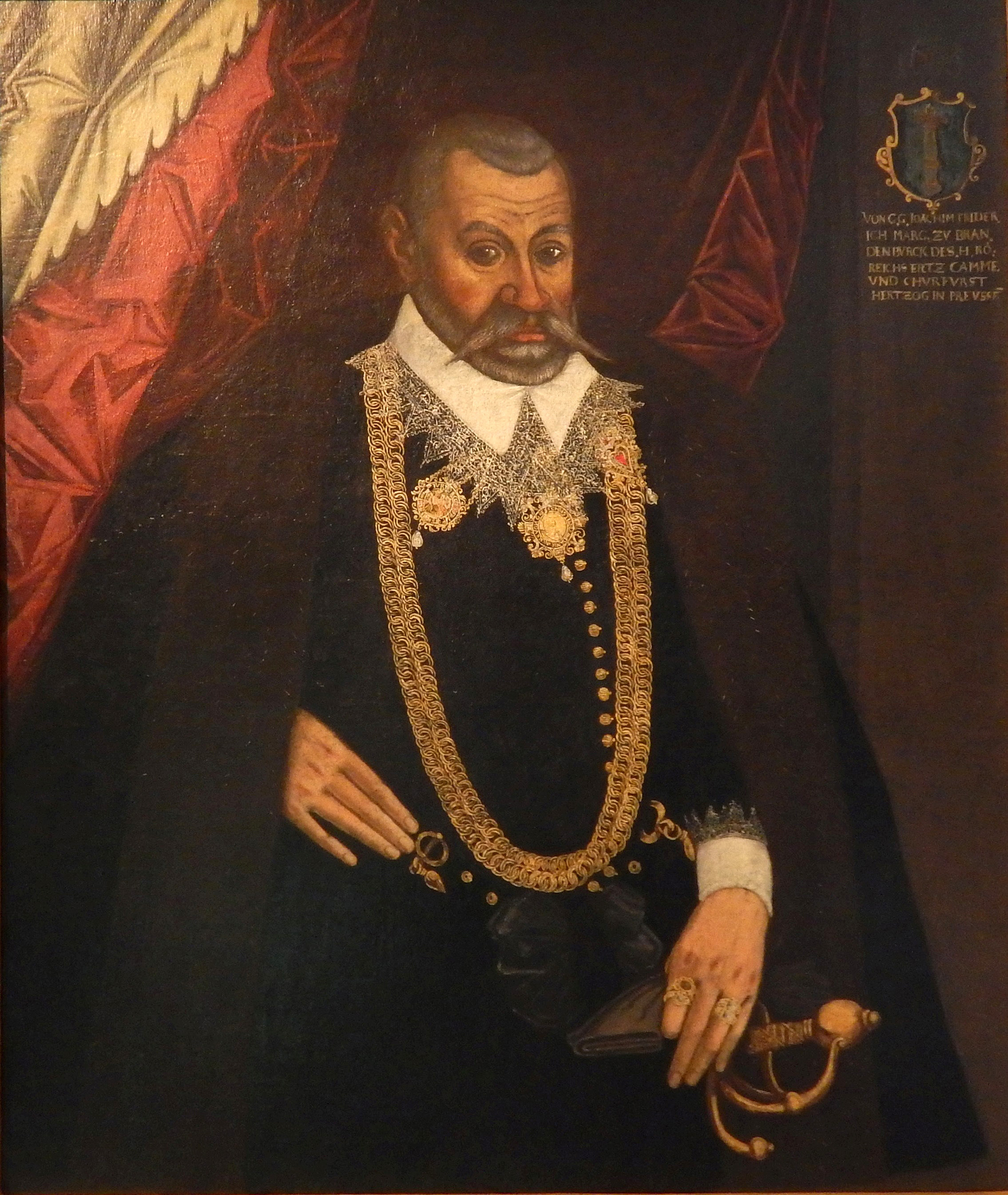

Elector of Brandenburg
- Reign: 8 January 1598 – 18 July 1608
- Predecessor: John George
- Successor: John Sigismund
- Born: 27 January 1546; Cölln, Berlin, Margraviate of Brandenburg, Holy Roman Empire
- Died: 18 July 1608 (aged 62); Cöpenick, Berlin, Margraviate of Brandenburg, Holy Roman Empire
- Burial: Berlin Cathedral
- Spouse: Catherine of Brandenburg-Küstrin (m. 1570; died 1602) Eleanor of Prussia (m. 1603; died 1607)
- Issue: John Sigismund, Elector of Brandenburg; Anne Catherine, Queen of Denmark and Norway; Johann Georg of Brandenburg; August of Brandenburg; Albert Frederick of Brandenburg; Joachim of Brandenburg; Ernest of Brandenburg; Barbara Sophie, Duchess of Württemberg; Christian William of Brandenburg; Marie Eleonore, Countess Palatine of Simmern-Kaiserslautern
- House: Hohenzollern
- Father: John George, Elector of Brandenburg
- Mother: Sophie of Legnica
- Religion: Lutheran

Joachim Frederick (27 January 1546 – 18 July 1608), of the House of Hohenzollern, was Prince-elector of the Margraviate of Brandenburg from 1598 until his death in 1608.

== Biography ==
Joachim Frederick was born in Cölln to John George, Elector of Brandenburg, and Sophie of Legnica. He served as administrator of the Archbishopric of Magdeburg from 1566 to 1598, then succeeded his father as Elector of Brandenburg in 1598. Joachim Frederick was succeeded at his death by his son John Sigismund. Joachim Frederick's first marriage on 7 March 1570 was to Catherine of Brandenburg-Küstrin, daughter of John, Margrave of Brandenburg-Küstrin, and Catherine of Brunswick-Wolfenbüttel.

Joachim Frederick and Catherine of Brandenburg-Küstrin had children:

- John Sigismund, Elector of Brandenburg (8 November 1572 – 23 December 1619)
- Anne Catherine (26 June 1575 – 29 March 1612), married King Christian IV of Denmark
- Girl [1576]
- John George, Duke of Jägerndorf (16 December 1577 – 2 March 1624) married Eva Christina of Württemberg (1590 - 1657), daughter of Frederick I, Duke of Württemberg and Sibylla of Anhalt. Elected Bishop of Strasbourg 1592; resigned 1604. Herrenmeister (Grand Master) of the Order of Saint John from 1616 until his death.
- August Frederick (16 February 1580 – 23 April 1601)
- Albert Frederick (29 April 1582 – 3 December 1600)
- Joachim (13 April 1583 – 10 June 1600)
- Ernest (13 April 1583 – 18 September 1613)
- Barbara Sophie (16 November 1584 – 13 February 1636), married John Frederick, Duke of Württemberg
- Girl [1585/6]
- Christian William (28 August 1587 – 1 January 1665)

Joachim Frederick's second marriage, on 23 October 1603, was to Eleanor of Prussia, born 21 August 1583, daughter of Albert Frederick and Marie Eleonore of Cleves.

Joachim Frederick and Eleanor of Prussia had one child:

- Marie Eleonore (22 March 1607 – 18 February 1675), married Louis Philip, Count Palatine of Simmern-Kaiserslautern

He became regent of the Duchy of Prussia in 1605. His titles also included "duke (Dux) of Stettin, Pomerania, Cassubia, Vandalorum and Crossen", according to the terms of the Treaty of Grimnitz, although the Pomeranian titles were only nominal.

== Legacy ==
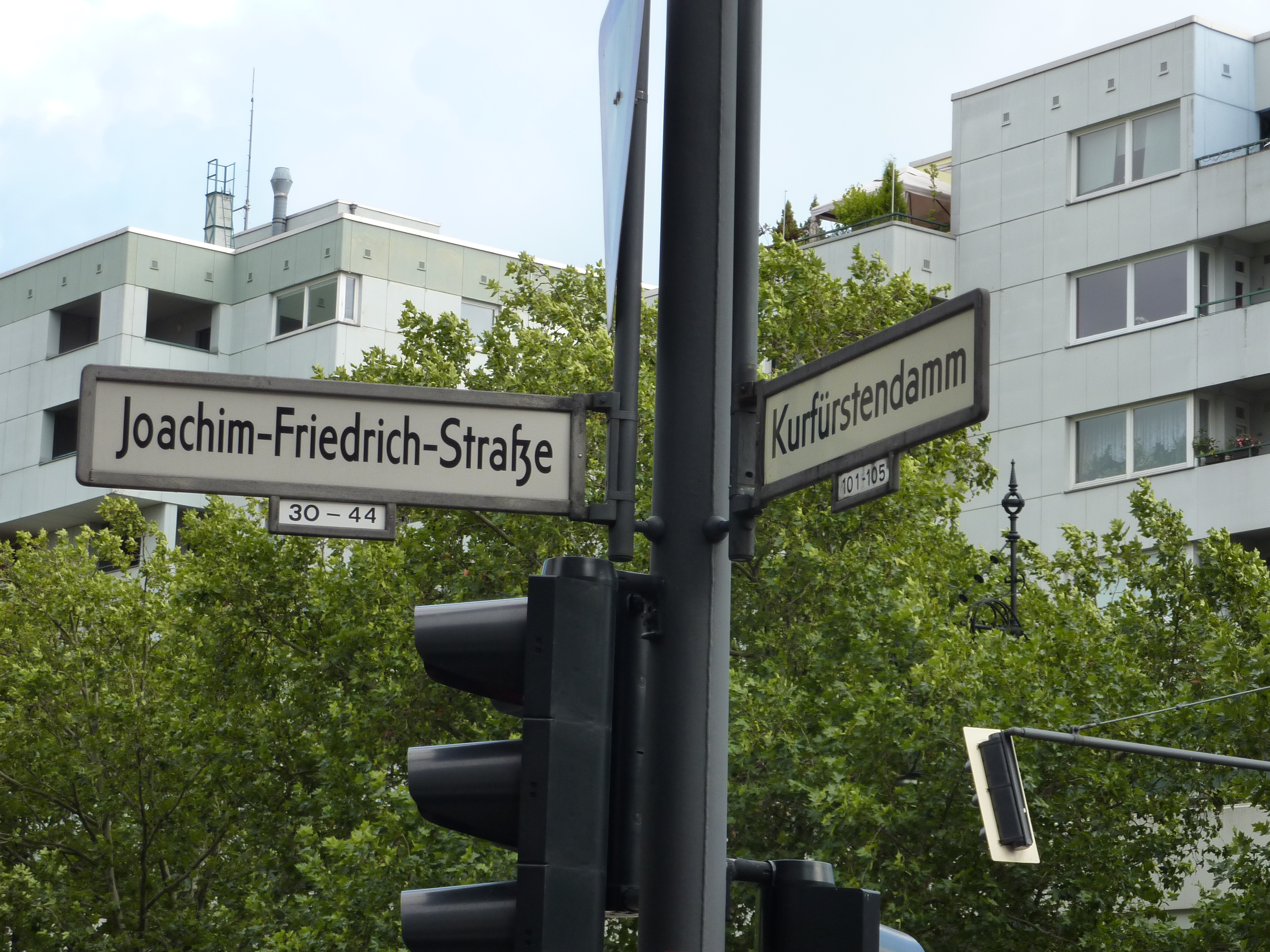
Joachim-Friedrich Strasse street sign, Berlin

Joachim-Friedrich Strasse in Berlin is named after him.

== Ancestry ==
Ancestors of Joachim Frederick, Elector of Brandenburg

8. Joachim I Nestor, Elector of Brandenburg
4. Joachim II Hector, Elector of Brandenburg
9. Elizabeth of Denmark
2. John George, Elector of Brandenburg
10. George, Duke of Saxony
5. Magdalena of Saxony
11. Barbara Jagiellon
1. Joachim Frederick, Elector of Brandenburg
12. Frederick I of Legnica
6. Frederick II of Legnica
13. Ludmila of Poděbrady
3. Sophie of Legnica
14. Frederick I, Margrave of Brandenburg-Ansbach
7. Sophie of Brandenburg-Ansbach-Kulmbach
15. Sophia of Poland

Joachim Frederick, Elector of Brandenburg House of Hohenzollern Born: 27 January 1546 Died: 18 July 1608
Regnal titles
Preceded by John George	Elector of Brandenburg; 1598–1608	Succeeded by John Sigismund
Preceded by Sigismund of Brandenburg	Administrator of Magdeburg; 1566–1598	Succeeded by Christian William of Brandenburg
