= Latin Kings =

Hispanic and Latino gang from Chicago, Illinois

- Latin Kings flag
- Founded: 1954; 72 years ago
- Founder: Ramon Santos
- Founding location: Humboldt Park, Chicago, Illinois, United States
- Years active: 1954–present
- Territory: The KMC faction is active in 31 U.S. states, and the Bloodline faction is active in 5 U.S. states. Presence also in Canada, Ecuador, Italy and Spain
- Ethnicity: Predominantly Hispanic and Latino: Puerto Ricans, Cuban Americans, Dominican Americans
- Membership (est.): 20,000–35,000 (KMC); 2,000–7,500 (Bloodline)
- Activities: Drug trafficking, assault, burglary, homicide, identity theft and money laundering

The Almighty Latin King and Queen Nation (ALKQN, ALKN, or LKN, also known as simply the Latin Kings) is a gang active primarily in the United States. The gang was founded by Puerto Ricans in Chicago, Illinois, in 1954.

In the United States, the Latin Kings operate under two umbrella factions—the King Motherland Chicago (KMC) faction, headquartered in Chicago, and the Bloodline faction, based in New York. The KMC faction consists of 60 structured chapters operating in 158 cities in 31 U.S. states, with an estimated membership of between 20,000 and 35,000. The Bloodline Latin Kings have an estimated membership of 2,200 to 7,500 and operate several dozen chapters in 15 cities across five states. The gang also has a significant presence in the prison system. The Latin Kings are involved in a wide variety of criminal activities, including drug dealing, assault, burglary, homicide, identity theft, and money laundering, with the gang's primary source of income derived from the street-level distribution of narcotics.

== History ==
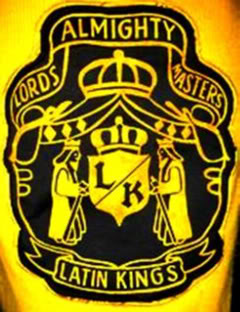
Latin Kings sweater patch

=== King Motherland Chicago faction ===
The Latin Kings were founded in the Humboldt Park area of Chicago in 1954 by Ramon Santos as the Imperials, a Puerto Rican progress movement with the goal of overcoming racial discrimination. With the Latino community facing constant violence from Greek and Italian greaser gangs, the Imperials merged with various other Puerto Rican and Mexican street gangs to form the Latin Kings, a key development in the history of gangs in Humboldt Park. Initially focused on resisting discrimination, the gang later became a criminal enterprise operating throughout the United States. There are two umbrella factions: the King Motherland Chicago (KMC)—also known as King Manifesto and Constitution—and Bloodline, formed in New York City in 1986. All members of the gang identify themselves as Latin Kings.

Latin Kings associated with the Motherland faction also identify themselves as the "Almighty Latin King Nation" (ALKN).

The Chicago faction of the Latin Kings is one of the largest street gangs based in Chicago.

=== Bloodline faction ===
The Bloodline Manifesto was founded by Luis "King Blood" Felipe in 1986 in the New York State Collins Correctional Facility. Latin Kings associated with the New York State Bloodline chapter also identify themselves as the "Almighty Latin King and Queen Nation" (ALKQN). Membership is estimated to be as large as 7,500, divided among several dozen tribes operating in 15 cities across five states.

From 1986 to 1994, the ALKQN solidified its status as a gang through crimes such as murder, racketeering, and other offenses covered under the RICO Act. In 1991, Felipe was returned to prison after a short release for parole violations, but continued to guide ALKQN members, who then numbered about 2,000.

In 1994, an internal power struggle led to violence within the organization. Between June 1993 and February 1994, seven Latin Kings were murdered. Felipe and 19 others were charged with murder and racketeering; by 1995, 39 Latin Kings and one Latin Queen had been indicted under the RICO Act.

Following Felipe's 1996 conviction, Antonio Fernandez became the Inca and Supreme Crown of New York State. The ALKQN subsequently began a transformation, with Latin Kings and Queens appearing at political demonstrations in support of the Latino community and holding monthly meetings at St. Mary's Episcopal Church in West Harlem. Fernandez amended the ALKQN manifesto to include parliamentary elections and new procedures for handling inter-organizational grievances, and to replace death as a possible punishment with banishment from the movement.

In 1997, Felipe was sentenced to 250 years in prison, with the first 45 to be spent in solitary confinement. Following Fernandez's release in 1998, a joint law-enforcement operation known as Operation Crown concluded with the arrests of 92 suspected ALKQN members.

During this period, the Latin Kings gained some legitimacy within the Puerto Rican Nationalist movement after Lolita Lebrón, a member of the Puerto Rican Nationalist Party, enlisted the New York State ALKQN to provide protection during a demonstration in front of the United Nations headquarters. In 1998, Fernandez pleaded guilty to conspiracy to sell and distribute heroin; in 1999, he was sentenced to 13 years in prison.

== Organizational structure ==
The Latin Kings have a hierarchical organizational structure. They have numerous "chapters" or "tribes" around the country that adhere to a regional, state, and national system. Officers are supported by a five-member "Crown Council". The Council sets rules and regulations and holds disciplinary hearings.

The hierarchy rises to regional officers and ultimately to two supreme regional "Incas" based in Chicago. The heads of the organization are known as "coronas".

=== Markings ===
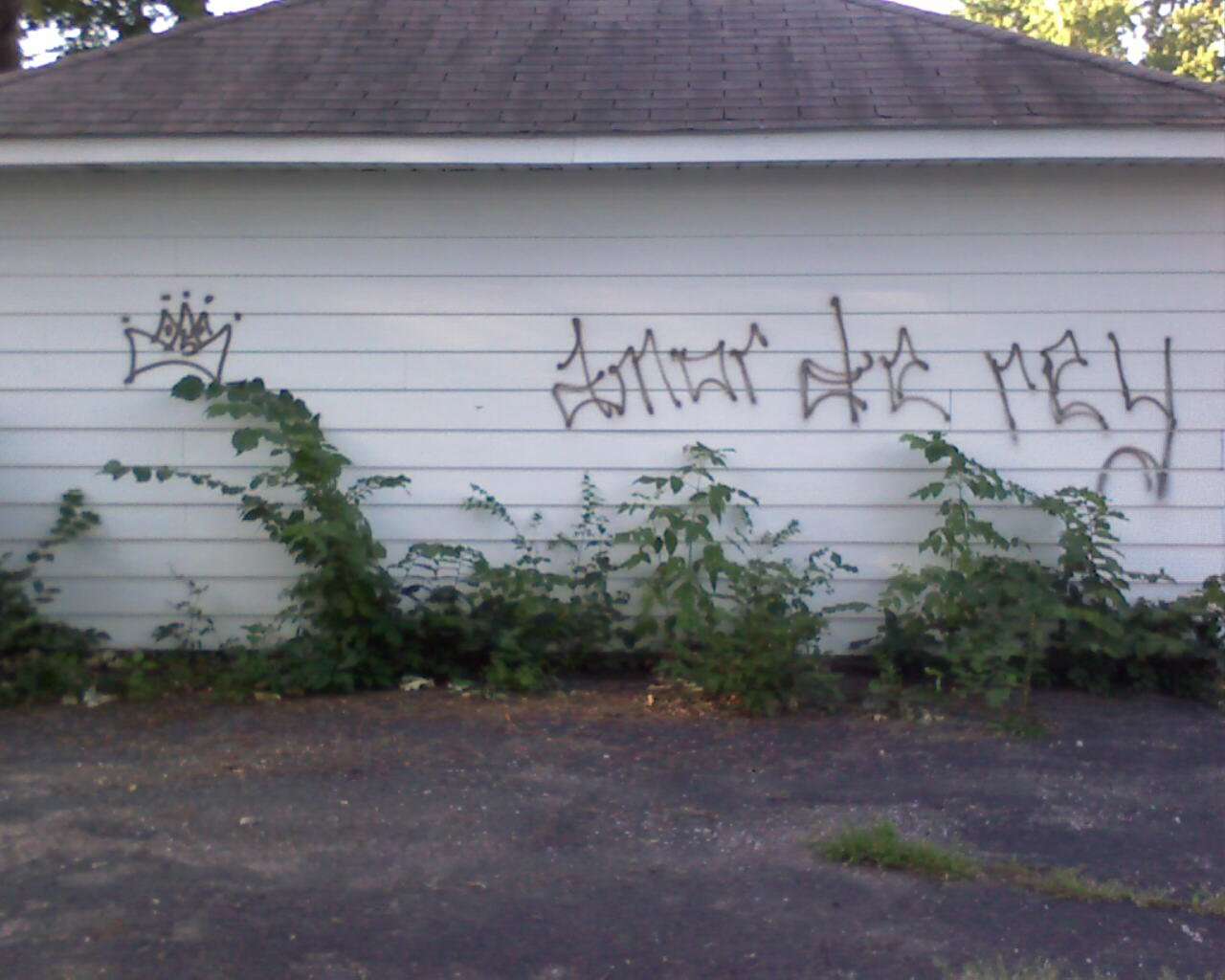
Latin Kings graffiti

The Latin King colors are black and gold. Gang markings include a five- or three-point "sacred crown", the abbreviations LK, ALK, ALKN, and ALKQN (or the full names), and drawings of the Lion or the King Master. Latin King symbolism is usually accompanied by the name and number of the tribe, region, or city. The Latin Kings are members of the People Nation alliance of gangs and are therefore opposed to the rival Folk Nation gang alliance.

== "Kingism" ideology ==
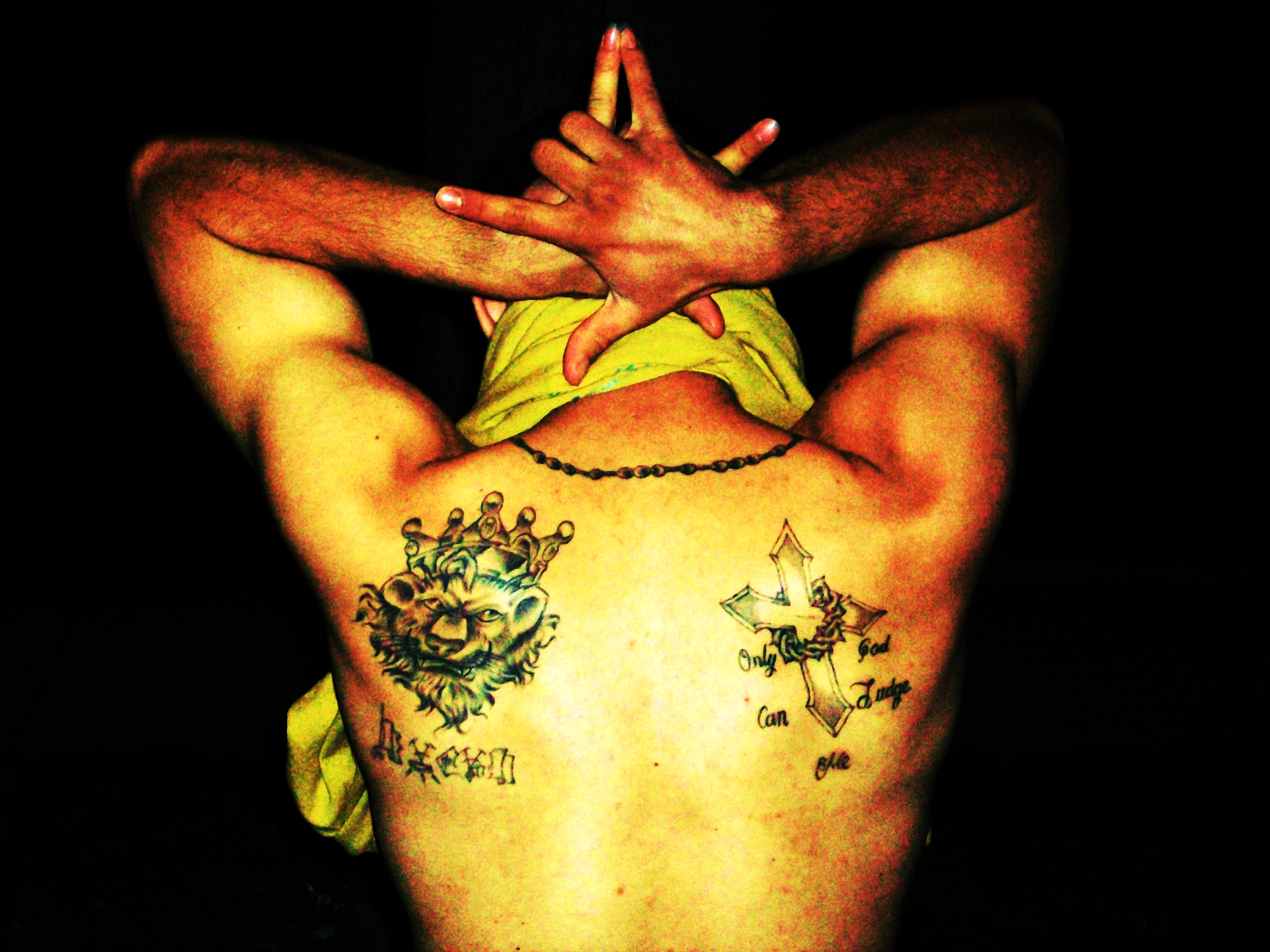
A gang member showing his Latin King tattoo – a lion with a crown – and signifying the five point star with his hands

John H. Richardson wrote in the February 1997 issue of New York magazine that the Kings had a "unique mixture of intense discipline, revolutionary politics and a homemade religion called 'Kingism'." Kingism is a blend of tribal gang rhetoric and religious mysticism. As one member put it, the Manifesto is "considered our Bible", and reading it is to go "from the darkness to the light".

The Latin Kings operate under strict codes and guidelines conveyed in a lengthy constitution, and they follow the teachings of the King Manifesto.

== Latin Queens ==
The Latin Queens included Queen Anubis and Queen Maat of the ALKQN.

The Latin Queen agenda includes self-respect, independence, family support, ethnic identity, and self-empowerment. These goals have attracted women who had experienced drug addiction, victimization, and neglect by families, spouses, or partners. Sociologists studying the Latin Kings and Queens have observed differences in how the two groups attempt to "reclaim and regulate" their environments. The Latin Queens are believed to focus more on private-space issues, such as home life and the protection and nurturing of their bodies, while the Latin Kings are more concerned with the loss of public spaces in their communities.

== See also ==
- Gang culture in Humboldt Park
- Gangs in Chicago
- Timeline of organized crime in Chicago
- My Bloody Life
