= Felipe López (footballer) =

Mexican footballer (born 1995)

Personal information
- Full name: Felipe López Gutiérrez
- Date of birth: 30 December 1995 (age 30)
- Place of birth: Guadalajara, Jalisco, Mexico
- Height: 1.78 m (5 ft 10 in)
- Position: Goalkeeper

Youth career
- 2010–2011: Oro
- 2011–2013: Instituto Once México
- 2013–2015: UdeG

Senior career*
Years	Team	Apps	(Gls)
2015–2026	UdeG	163	(0)
2020	→ Juarez (loan)	0	(0)
- * Club domestic league appearances and goals as of 212 April 2025

Felipe López Gutiérrez (born 30 December 1995) is a Mexican footballer who plays as a goalkeeper.
