= Felipe (footballer, born 1988) =

Brazilian footballer

Personal information
- Full name: Felipe de Almeida Gomes
- Date of birth: January 5, 1988 (age 38)
- Place of birth: Rio de Janeiro, Brazil
- Height: 1.73 m (5 ft 8 in)
- Position: Striker

Senior career*
Years	Team	Apps	(Gls)
2003–2007	America-RJ		
2007	→Vegalta Sendai (loan)		
2007	→FC Perada Fukushima (loan)		
- * Club domestic league appearances and goals

Felipe de Almeida Gomes (born January 5, 1988), known as just Felipe, is a Brazilian football player.
