= Felipe Santos =

Felipe dos Santos or Felipe Santos may refer to:

- Felipe dos Santos (decathlete) (Felipe Vinícius dos Santos, born 1994), Brazilian decathlete
- Felipe Bardi dos Santos (born 1998), Brazilian sprinter
- Filipe dos Santos (1896–1941), Portuguese footballer
- Felipe (footballer, born February 1984) (Felipe Ventura dos Santos), Brazilian football goalkeeper
- Felipe Azevedo dos Santos (born 1987), Brazilian football player
- Filipe Francisco dos Santos (born 1987), Brazilian footballer
- Felipe Santos (missing person) (born 1979), Mexico-born person who disappeared in 2003
- Felipe Santos (water polo) (Felipe Santos da Costa e Silva, born 1984), Brazilian water polo player
- Felipe Santos (footballer) (born 1997), Beninese footballer
