= Felipe Fumaça =

Brazilian footballer (born 1993)

Personal information
- Full name: Felipe Henrique Jose dos Santos
- Date of birth: 8 July 1993 (age 33)
- Place of birth: Araraquara, Brazil
- Height: 1.83 m (6 ft 0 in)
- Position: Forward

Team information
- Current team: Olímpia SP

Senior career*
Years	Team	Apps	(Gls)
2012–2014	Monte Azul	26	(3)
2014	Olímpia SP		
2015	Comercial MS		
2015	Luch-Energiya	6	(0)
2015	Monte Azul		
2016	Spartaks Jūrmala	6	(0)
2016	Inter de Bebedouro		
2017	Cascavel	0	(0)
2017–	Olímpia SP	0	(0)
2019	→ São Bernardo (loan)	0	(0)
2019	→ Anápolis (loan)		
- * Club domestic league appearances and goals as of 22:51, 2 January 2020 (UTC)

Felipe Henrique Jose dos Santos (born 8 July 1993, in Araraquara), known as Felipe Fumaça or simply Felipe, is a Brazilian footballer who plays as a forward for Olímpia SP.

He made his debut in the Russian Football National League for FC Luch-Energiya Vladivostok on 14 March 2015 in a game against FC Tyumen.
