= Palatinate-Simmern-Kaiserslautern =

Palatinate-Simmern-Kaiserslautern; Pfalz-Simmern-Kaiserslautern
1610 – 1674
Capital; Circle; Bench	Simmern; Upper Rhenish; Council of Princes
Partitioned from the Palatinate	1610
To the Palatinate	1673
Extinct	1674

Palatinate-Simmern-Kaiserslautern was a state of the Holy Roman Empire based in the Counties Palatine of Simmern and Kaiserslautern, and the Palatinian portion of the County of Sponheim in modern Rhineland-Palatinate, Germany.

Palatinate-Simmern-Kaiserslautern was created in 1610 from the partition of the Palatinate after the death of Frederick IV for his son Louis Philip. In 1673 Louis Philip's son and successor Louis Henry abandoned rulership of his territories to the Palatinate, and died heirless the next year.

Name	Notes
Louis Philip	1610–1655
Louis Henry	1655–1674
