= Pedro Felipe (footballer, born 1997) =

Brazilian footballer (born 1997)

Personal information
- Full name: Pedro Felipe dos Santos Santana
- Date of birth: 14 February 1997 (age 29)
- Place of birth: Salvador, Brazil
- Height: 1.87 m (6 ft 2 in)
- Position: Forward

Team information
- Current team: Portuguesa (on loan from Noroeste)
- Number: 7

Youth career
- Vitória da Conquista

Senior career*
Years	Team	Apps	(Gls)
2018	Osvaldo Cruz	20	(3)
2019–2020	Noroeste	31	(5)
2020–2023	Mirassol	4	(0)
2021	→ Noroeste (loan)	11	(4)
2021–2022	→ Grazer AK (loan)	28	(3)
2023	→ Portuguesa Santista (loan)	9	(0)
2024–	Noroeste	46	(8)
2024	→ ABC (loan)	15	(0)
2025	→ São Bernardo (loan)	23	(3)
2026	→ Confiança (loan)	4	(0)
2027–	→ Portuguesa (loan)	0	(0)
- * Club domestic league appearances and goals as of 22:47, 9 November 2026 (UTC)

Pedro Felipe dos Santos Santana (born 14 February 1997), known as Pedro Felipe, is a Brazilian professional footballer who plays as a forward for Portuguesa, on loan from Noroeste.

== Career ==
Born in Salvador, Bahia, Pedro Felipe played for local side Vitória da Conquista's youth sides before joining Osvaldo Cruz in 2018, after a trial period. On 27 December, he moved to Noroeste.

On 16 November 2020, Pedro Felipe was announced at Mirassol. After helping the side to win the 2020 Série D, he returned to Norusca on loan on 17 February 2021.

On 18 June 2021, Pedro Felipe moved abroad and joined Austrian 2. Liga side Grazer AK also on loan. He left the side on 8 June 2022, and featured rarely for Mirassol before moving to Portuguesa Santista on 28 November.

On 16 May 2023, Pedro Felipe returned to Noroeste for a third spell. The following 17 April, he moved to ABC on loan, and returned to his parent club on 14 November 2024.

On 8 April 2025, Pedro Felipe was loaned to Série C side São Bernardo until the end of the year. Back to Norusca for the 2026 season, he joined Confiança on loan on 10 July of that year, but returned to his parent club in September.

On 17 November 2026, Pedro Felipe was announced at Portuguesa for one year.

== Career statistics ==
As of 9 November 2026

Club	Season	League			State League		Cup		Continental		Other		Total	
Club	Season	Division	Apps	Goals	Apps	Goals	Apps	Goals	Apps	Goals	Apps	Goals	Apps	Goals
Osvaldo Cruz	2018	Paulista 2ª Divisão	—		20	3	—		—		—		20	3
Noroeste	2019	Paulista A3	—		13	1	—		—		9 (Note: Appearance(s) in Copa Paulista)	2	22	3
Noroeste	2020	Paulista A3	—		18	4	—		—		—		18	4
Noroeste	Total		—		31	5	—		—		9	2	40	7
Mirassol	2020	Série D	3	0	—		—		—		—		3	0
Mirassol	2021	Série C	1	0	—		—		—		—		1	0
Mirassol	2022	Série C	1	0	—		—		—		—		1	0
Mirassol	Total		5	0	—		—		—		—		5	0
Noroeste (loan)	2021	Paulista A3	—		11	4	—		—		—		11	4
Grazer AK (loan)	2021–22	2. Liga	28	3	—		0	0	—		—		28	3
Portuguesa Santista (loan)	2023	Paulista A2	—		9	0	—		—		—		9	0
Noroeste	2023	Paulista A2	—		—		—		—		11	4	11	4
Noroeste	2024	Paulista A2	—		20	3	—		—		—		20	3
Noroeste	2025	Paulista	—		10	3	—		—		—		10	3
Noroeste	2026	Série D	9	1	7	1	—		—		3	0	19	2
Noroeste	Total		9	1	37	7	—		—		14	4	60	12
ABC (loan)	2024	Série C	15	0	—		—		—		—		15	0
São Bernardo (loan)	2025	Série C	23	3	—		—		—		—		23	3
Confiança (loan)	2026	Série C	4	0	—		—		—		—		4	0
Portuguesa (loan)	2027	Série D	0	0	0	0	0	0	—		—		0	0
Career total			84	7	88	16	0	0	0	0	23	6	195	29

== Honours ==
Mirassol

- Campeonato Brasileiro Série D: 2020
- Campeonato Brasileiro Série C: 2022
