= Luis Felipe (gang leader) =

Former gang leader incarcerated in a US federal prison

- Felipe in an interview
- Born: May 6, 1962 (age 64); Havana, Cuba
- Other name: King Blood
- Occupation: Former street gang leader
- Status: Imprisoned at ADX Florence supermax prison in Fremont County, Colorado
- Convictions: New York; Second-degree manslaughter Possession of stolen property Federal; First-degree murder (3 counts); Attempted murder (3 counts); Conspiracy to commit murder 11 other counts
- Penalty: New York; Nine years Federal; Life imprisonment plus 45 years without parole

Luis Felipe, also known as "King Blood", is a Cuban-American former gang leader and is the founder of the New York chapter of the Latin Kings (ALKN) street gang.

Born in Havana, Cuba, Felipe emigrated to the United States in the Mariel Boatlift in 1980. Six years later, in 1986, after fleeing Chicago, he founded the New York chapter of the Latin Kings.

In 1995, he was convicted of ordering multiple murders from prison by writing to members of the Latin Kings on the outside. Judge John S. Martin Jr. sentenced him to life imprisonment plus 45 years. Furthermore, the judge added extraordinary conditions, surprising even prosecutors. Judge Martin said Felipe must serve the sentence in solitary confinement. He forbade him to write or be visited by anyone except his lawyer and close relatives, of whom Felipe has none. Finally, the judge said that he himself, rather than the Federal Bureau of Prisons, would control the case. However, the appellate court recognized that federal statutes generally allow only the attorney general, through the Bureau of Prisons (BOP) to determine the conditions of confinement imposed on federal prisoners, but that other statutes, allow district courts to set special conditions of confinement on defendants convicted of racketeering.

Felipe was convicted of 18 total federal charges which included three murders, three attempted murders and one conspiracy to commit murder in which a victim was injured. The murdered victims were William Cartegena, Victor Hirschman and Ismael Rios, who were killed in September 1993, October 1993 and January 1994 respectively. The surviving victims were Margie Carderon, Rafael Gonzalez, Ronnie Gonzalez and Pedro Rosario, who were attacked within the same time period as the murdered victims. Prior to the 1990's murder spree, Felipe was convicted of second degree manslaughter for shooting his girlfriend in 1981 and was sentenced to nine years. He was paroled in 1989, but went back to prison two years later for possessing stolen property.

Felipe is currently incarcerated at ADX Florence.
