= Louis Henry, Count Palatine of Simmern =

Louis Henry
- Born: 11 October 1640
- Died: 3 January 1674 (aged 33)
- Occupation: Count Palatine
- Spouse: Maria of Orange-Nassau (m. 1666)

Louis Henry (German: Ludwig Heinrich) (11 October 1640 - 3 January 1674) was the Count Palatine of Simmern-Kaiserslautern from 1653 until 1673.

== Life ==
Louis Henry was born in 1640 as the only surviving son of Louis Philip, Count Palatine of Simmern-Kaiserslautern. He succeeded his father in 1655, and was under the regency of his mother, Marie Eleonore von Brandenburg, till 1658. He retired from ruling in 1673. He died less than a year later, and was buried in the St-Stephan's Church in Simmern.

== Marriage ==
Louis Henry married Maria of Orange-Nassau (5 September 1642 - 20 March 1688) in 1666, daughter of the Dutch prince Frederick Henry. The marriage remained childless.

== Literature ==
- Felix Joseph Lipowsky: Karl Ludwig Churfürst von der Pfalz. Seidel, 1824, S. 53
- Heinrich August Pierer: Universal-lexikon der gegenwart und vergangenheit: oder, Neuestes encyclopädisches wörterbuch der wissenschaften, künste und gewerbe, bearb von mehr als 220 gelehrten, Band 18, H. A. Pierer, 1843, S. 148 Digital version

Louis Henry, Count Palatine of Simmern House of Palatinate-Simmern Cadet branch of the House of Wittelsbach Born: 11 October 1640 Died: 3 January 1674
Regnal titles
Preceded by Louis Philip	Duke of Simmern-Kaiserslautern; 1655 - 1674	Succeeded by Charles I Louis of the Electorate of the Palatinate
