= Louis Philip, Count Palatine of Simmern =

German noble of the Electoral Palatinate (1602–1655)

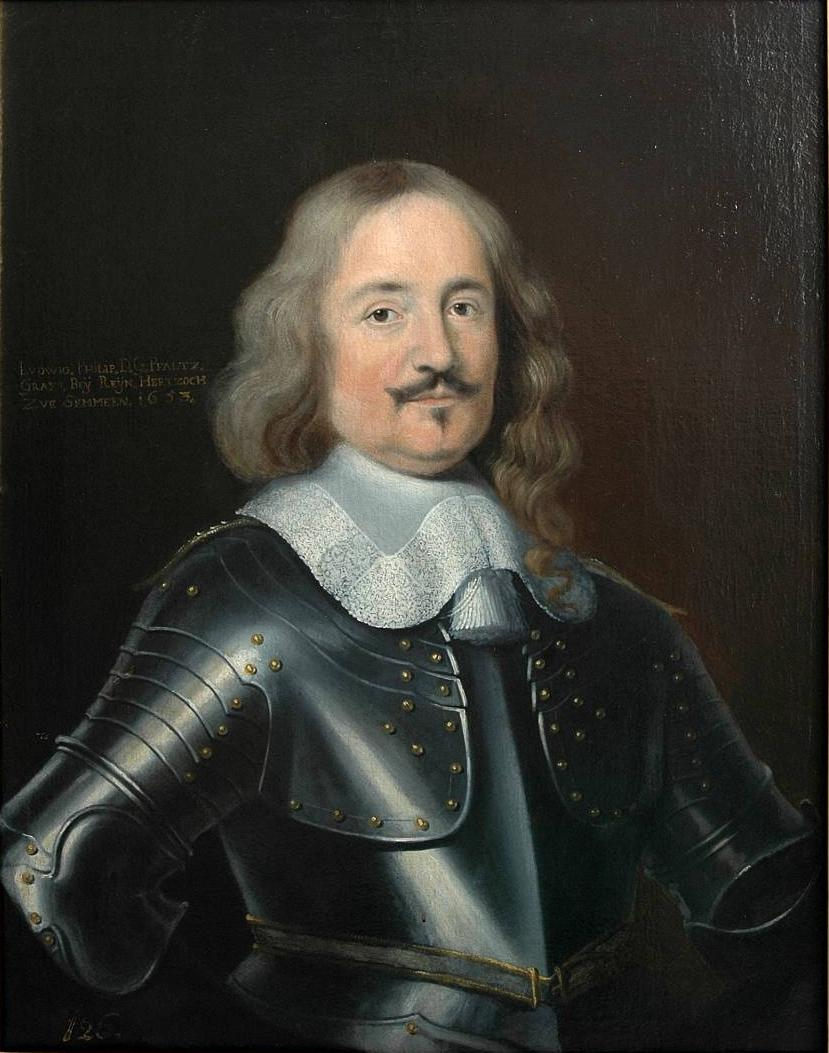
Louis Philip

Louis Philip (German: Ludwig Philipp) (23 November 1602 – 6 January 1655) was the Count Palatine of Simmern-Kaiserslautern from 1610 until 1655. Philip acted as Administrator of the Electoral Palatinate between 1632 and 1648.

Philip was born in Heidelberg, as the youngest son of Frederick IV, Elector Palatine and Countess Louise Juliana of Nassau, herself the eldest daughter of William the Silent and his third spouse Charlotte de Bourbon-Montpensier. After his father's death in 1610, Louis Philip inherited his territories around Simmern, Kaiserslautern and Sponheim.

Philip was appointed as Administrator (Regent) of the Electoral Palatinate after the 1632 death of the Elector Frederick, and held that post until the restoration of Frederick's son Charles in 1648.

Philip died in Krossen and was buried in Simmern.

== Marriage ==
Louis Philip married Marie Eleonore von Brandenburg (1 April 1607 - 18 February 1675), daughter of Elector Joachim Frederick, on 4 December 1631 and had the following children:

1. Charles Frederick (6 January 1633 - 13 January 1635)
2. Gustavus Louis (1 March 1634 - 5 August 1635)
3. Charles Philip (20 April 1635 - 24 February 1636)
4. Louis Casimir (27 September 1636 - 14 December 1652)
5. Elizabeth Maria Charlotte (23/24 October 1638 - 10/22 May 1664), wife of George III of Brieg
6. Louis Henry (11 October 1640 - 3 January 1674)
7. Louise Sophie Eleanore (27 June 1642 - 29 March 1643)

Regnal titles
Preceded by Frederick IV	Duke of Simmern-Kaiserslautern; 1610 – 1655	Succeeded by Louis Henry
