= Elisabeth of Anhalt-Zerbst =

Electress of Brandenburg (1563–1607)

- Electress of Brandenburg
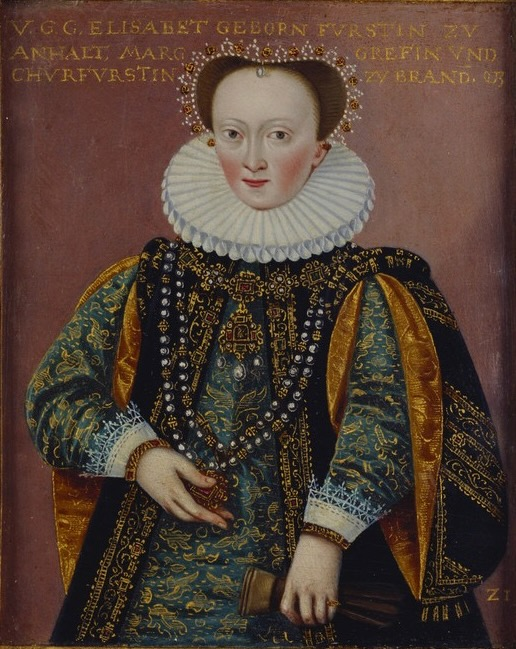
- Born: 15 September 1563; Zerbst
- Died: 8 November 1607 (aged 44); Crossen
- Buried: Cathedral in Berlin
- Noble family: Ascania
- Spouse: John George, Elector of Brandenburg (m. 1577; died 1598)
- Issue: See: Christian, Margrave of Brandenburg-Bayreuth; Magdalena, Landgravine of Hesse-Darmstadt; Joachim Ernst, Margrave of Brandenburg-Ansbach; Agnes, Duchess of Pomerania and Saxe-Lauenburg; Frederick IX, Margrave of Brandenburg; Elisabeth Sophia, Duchess of Saxe-Lauenburg; Dorothea Sibylle, Duchess of Brieg; George Albert II, Margrave of Brandenburg; Sigismund; John, Bishop of Havelberg; John George
- Father: Joachim Ernest, Prince of Anhalt
- Mother: Agnes of Barby

Elisabeth of Anhalt-Zerbst (15 September 1563 – 8 November 1607) was Electress of Brandenburg by marriage to John George, Elector of Brandenburg.

== Early life ==
Elizabeth was a daughter of Joachim Ernest, Prince of Anhalt (1536–1585), from his first marriage to Countess Agnes of Barby-Mühlingen (1540–1569). After her mothers death, her father remarried to Eleonore of Württemberg.

== Biography ==
On 6 October 1577 she married John George (1525–1598), in Jagdschloss Letzlingen. Her husband was almost 40 years older than she was. Elisabeth was his third wife, and was 16 years younger than her stepson Joachim Frederick. The marriage was celebrated without many festivities, and Elizabeth was promised 400 guilders annually as her dower. Elizabeth brought as a dowry into the marriage 15 000 thalers and received as jointure, besides a considerable pension, the city of Crossen, including Crossen Palace, plus the district and city of Züllichau and the lordship of Bobrowice (German: Bobersberg).

Elisabeth was a patron of the scholar Leonhard Thurneysser. After her husband's death, weakened by child-bearing, she retired with her younger children to her widow seat of Crossen Palace. She is buried in the crypt of the Hohenzollerns in the Berliner Dom.

== Issue ==
Her marriage to John George of Brandenburg produced the following children:

1. Christian (30 January 1581 – 30 May 1655)
2. Magdalena (7 January 1582 – 4 May 1616), married in 1598 to Louis V, Landgrave of Hesse-Darmstadt
3. Joachim Ernest (22 June 1583 – 7 March 1625)
4. Agnes (17 July 1584 – 26 March 1629), married:
  1. in 1604 Duke Philipp Julius of Pomerania;
  2. in 1628 Duke Francis Charles of Saxe-Lauenburg
5. Frederick (22 March 1588 – 19 May 1611)
6. Elisabeth Sophia (13 July 1589 – 24 December 1629), married:
  1. in 1613 to Reichsfürst (Prince) Janusz Radziwiłł;
  2. in 1628 to Duke Julius Henry of Saxe-Lauenburg
7. Dorothea Sibylle (19 October 1590 – 9 March 1625), married in 1610 to Duke John Christian of Brieg
8. George Albert (20 November 1591 – 29 November 1615)
9. Sigismund (20 November 1592 – 30 April 1640)
10. John (13 July 1597 – 23 September 1627), Bishop of Havelberg
11. John George (4 August 1598 – 27 January 1637)

== References and sources ==
- Friederike Bornhak: Elisabeth von Anhalt: Kurfürstin von Brandenburg, dritte Gemahlin des Kurfürsten Johann Georg von Brandenburg, geboren 1563, gestorben 1607, S. Geibel, 1889
- Ernst Daniel Martin Kirchner: Die Kurfürstinnen und Königinnen auf dem Throne der Hohhenzollern, part 2l: Die letzten acht Kurfürstinnen, Berlin, 1867, p. 34 ff. (digitized)

Elisabeth of Anhalt-Zerbst House of Ascania Born: 15 September 1563 Died: 8 November 1607
German nobility
Vacant Title last held by Sabina of Brandenburg-Ansbach	Electress consort of Brandenburg; 6 October 1577 – 8 January 1598	Succeeded by Catherine of Brandenburg-Küstrin
