= Doberschütz (surname) =

Doberschütz or von Doberschütz is a German language habitational surname. Notable people with the name include:

- Elizabeth of Doberschütz (died 1591), victim of witch hunts in Neustettin
- Gerlinde Doberschütz (born 1964), German rower
- Jens Doberschütz (born 1957), German rower
- Melchior of Doberschütz (16th-century), member of the Silesian noble family of Doberschütz
