= Francis Erdmann, Duke of Saxe-Lauenburg =

Francis Erdmann

Duke of Saxe-Lauenburg
- Reign: 1665–1666
- Predecessor: Julius Henry
- Successor: Julius Francis
- Born: 25 February 1629; Theusing
- Died: 30 July 1666 (aged 37); Schwarzenbek
- Consort: Sibylle Hedwig of Saxe-Lauenburg
- House: House of Ascania
- Father: Julius Henry, Duke of Saxe-Lauenburg
- Mother: Elisabeth Sophia of Brandenburg
- Religion: Lutheran

Francis Erdmann of Saxe-Lauenburg (Theusing, 25 February 1629 – 30 July 1666, Schwarzenbek), was duke of Saxe-Lauenburg between 1665 and 1666. When he married in 1651, he was given title to Groß Grönau where he built a church.

== Family and marriage ==
He was the eldest son of Duke Julius Henry and his second wife Elisabeth Sophia of Brandenburg, daughter of John George, Elector of Brandenburg.

In 1651 Francis Erdmann married his half-cousin Sibylle Hedwig of Saxe-Lauenburg (30 July 1625 – 1 August 1703, Ratzeburg), daughter of Duke Augustus. Because his marriage produced no heirs, Francis Erdmann was succeeded by his half-brother, Julius Francis.

== Ancestry ==
Ancestors of Francis Erdmann, Duke of Saxe-Lauenburg

16. Magnus I, Duke of Saxe-Lauenburg
8. Francis I, Duke of Saxe-Lauenburg
17. Catherine of Brunswick-Lüneburg
4. Francis II, Duke of Saxe-Lauenburg
18. Henry IV, Duke of Saxony
9. Sybille of Saxony
19. Catherine of Mecklenburg-Schwerin
2. Julius Henry, Duke of Saxe-Lauenburg
20. Henry V, Duke of Brunswick-Lüneburg
10. Julius, Duke of Brunswick-Wolfenbüttel
21. Maria of Württemberg
5. Maria of Brunswick-Lüneburg
22. Joachim II Hector, Elector of Brandenburg (=#12)
11. Hedwig of Brandenburg
23. Hedwig Jagiellon
1. Francis Erdmann, Duke of Saxe-Lauenburg
24. Joachim I Nestor, Elector of Brandenburg
12. Joachim II Hector, Elector of Brandenburg (=#22)
25. Elizabeth of Denmark
6. John George, Elector of Brandenburg
26. George, Duke of Saxony
13. Magdalena of Saxony
27. Barbara Jagiellon
3. Elisabeth Sophia of Brandenburg
28. John V, Prince of Anhalt-Zerbst
14. Joachim Ernest, Prince of Anhalt-Zerbst
29. Margaret of Brandenburg
7. Elisabeth of Anhalt-Zerbst
30. Wolfgang I, Count of Barby-Mühlingen
15. Agnes of Barby-Mühlingen
31. Agnes of Mansfeld zu Mittel-Ort

Francis Erdmann, Duke of Saxe-Lauenburg House of Ascania Born: 25 February 1629 in Theusing Died: 30 July 1666 in Schwarzenbek
Regnal titles
| Preceded by Julius Henry | Duke of Saxe-Lauenburg; 1665–1666 | Succeeded by Julius Francis |
