= Melchior of Doberschütz =

Pomeranian town chief and governor of Neustettin (fl. late 16th century)

- Noble family: von Doberschütz
- Spouses: Elizabeth of Doberschütz; Anna of Löben
- Father: Andreas von Doberschütz

Melchior of Doberschütz (also spelled Dobschütz), mentioned from 1572 to 1600, was a member of the Silesian noble family of Doberschütz and was a city captain of Neustettin (Szczecinek) in the Duchy of Pomerania and a landlord holding vast possessions in Pomerania and Brandenburg. His wife, Elizabeth of Doberschütz, was accused of witchcraft for political reasons, and ultimately to hurt him, and was executed in 1591 in Stettin (Szczecin).

== Life ==
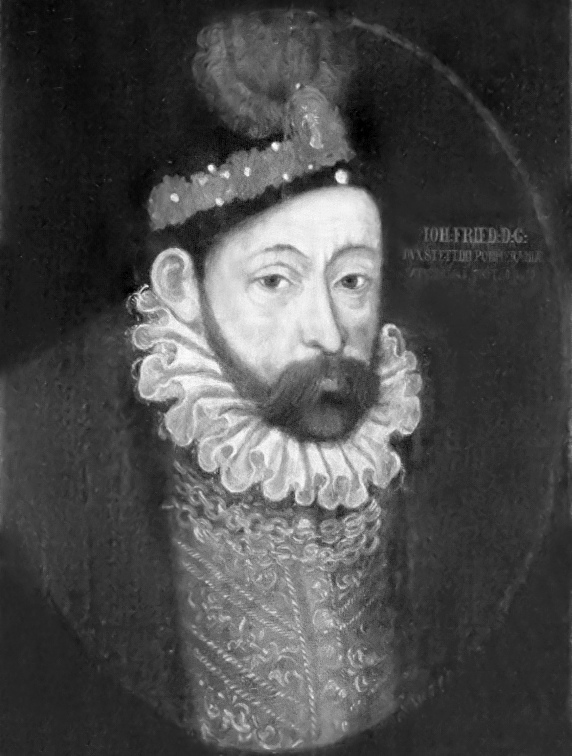
Duke John Frederick of Pomerania

Doberschütz was one of at least five sons of Andreas of Doberschütz (died 1572), landlord of a portion of Plau (1530–1565) in the Landkreis Crossen in Brandenburg. Around the year 1575 Doberschütz was the owner of a small unprofitable portion of the family estate of Plau. The estate had splintered into many small fragments, due to being subdivided each time a Lord died leaving multiple sons. He had to look for other income opportunities and went into the service of the Duke of Pomerania.

Initially, Doberschütz served as ducal Hunt Master at Ihnaburg (today part of Goleniów) in Altdamm (Dąbie) County, because of his excellent hunting skills. Later, he was city captain of Neustettin. On 26 July 1579, he received the field mark Zamborst (Samborsko) from Duke John Frederick as a fief, under the condition that he would build a village in the area. During these years, Doberschütz had acquired the favor of his Duke, who had been married with the Princess Erdmuthe of Brandenburg since 1577. His appointment aroused the envy of some courtiers, especially the then powerful favorite of Peter von Kameke. It was said that Peter von Kameke and Jakob von Kleist began the intrigues and slanders about Doberschütz's wife Elizabeth being a witch, to push Doberschütz out of office. They succeeded and in 1584, von Kleist succeeded Doberschütz as city captain of Szczecinek.

On 28 September 1583 Doberschütz sold Zamborst for 1000 taler to von Kleist, who was acknowledged as a vassal by the Duke. In 1586, Doberschütz bought all the fragments of the family estate of Plau. He paid homage to Elector John George of Brandenburg.

Despite his expulsion from office, Doberschütz could still enjoy his wealth. It was said that von Kleist was still jealous and tried to completely ruin Doberschütz by slander against him and his wife Elizabeth. It was rumoured that she was a witch. When von Kleist attempted to brew beer and failed, this was attributed to a witch's curse. The insinuations and intrigues of the courtiers gradually succeeded in bringing Doberschütz completely into the Duke's disgrace. He had been ousted from office long ago, and around 1590 he had to leave Pomerania. His assets were confiscated.

Doberschütz turned for help to Elector John George of Brandenburg, to whom he had personal contacts. In 1591, while his wife sat in jail in Stettin, Doberschütz served in the Commandery of the Knights Hospitallers in Crossen an der Oder.

Around 15 January 1600, Doberschütz married his second wife, Anna of Löben.

== Noble family ==
Melchior von Doberschütz is sometimes called Melchior von Dobschütz in the literature. This is incorrect: Melchior was not a member of the Dobschütz family. There are two clues for this:

- In a document dated 7 April 1590, in which the sale of the field mark Zamborst is confirmed again, he is called Melchior Dobbersitz. This is closer to Doberschütz than to Dobschütz.
- In addition, he is known as a princely hunter champion at Plew, by which presumably his estate at Plau is meant, that has been demonstrated to have been owned by the Doberschütz family at least from 1490 to 1660.
