= Tauchlitz =

- Ortsteil of Crossen an der Elster
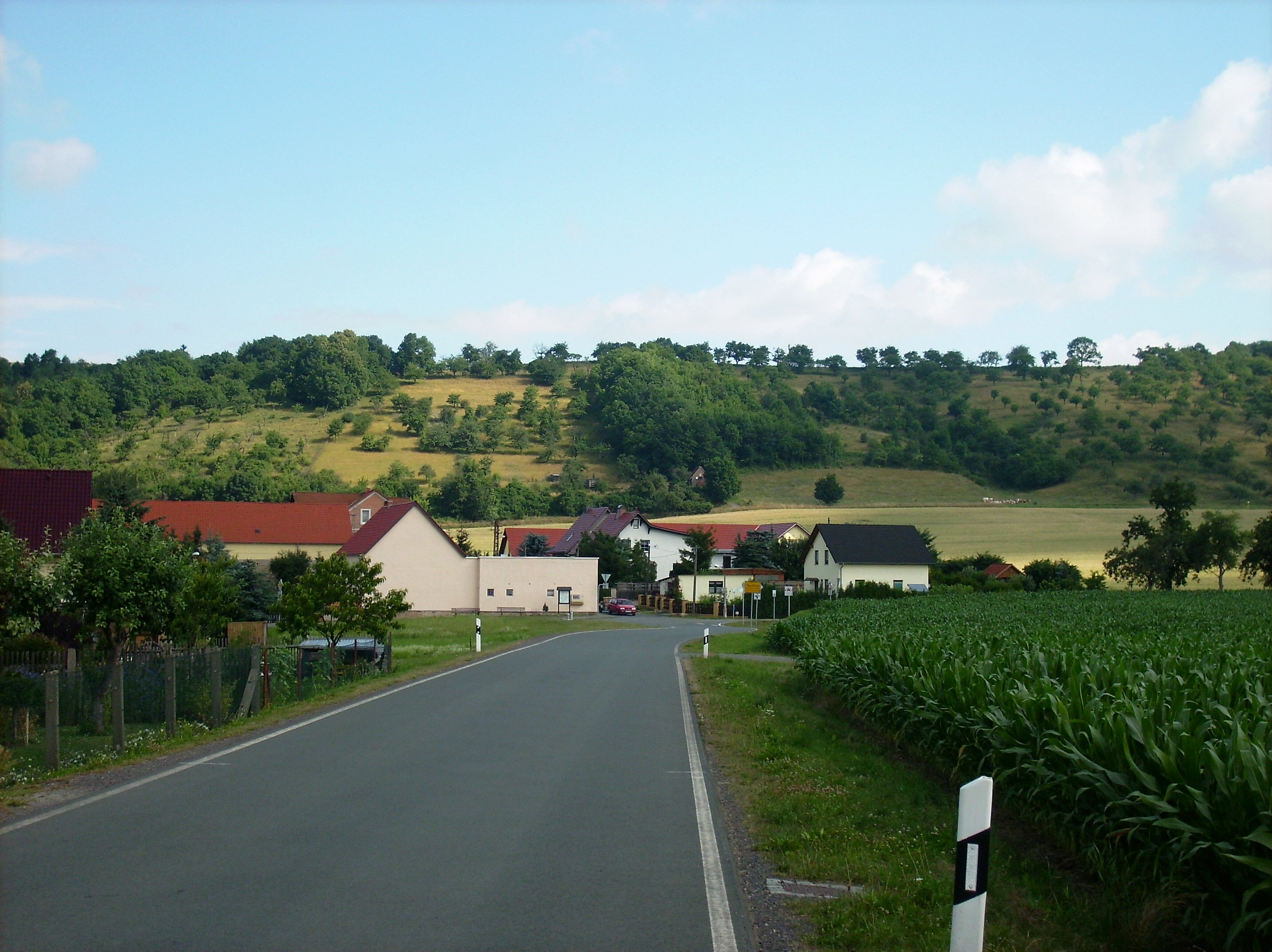
- Tauchlitz from the South
- Interactive map of Tauchlitz
- Location within Germany Location within Thuringia
- Coordinates: 50°58′08″N 11°59′43″E
- Country: Germany
- State: Thuringia
- Municipality: Crossen an der Elster
- Elevation: 175 m (574 ft)
- Time zone: UTC+01:00 (CET)
  - Summer (DST): UTC+02:00 (CEST)
- Postal codes: 07613
- Dialling codes: 036693

Tauchlitz is a village within the municipality of Crossen an der Elster in Saale-Holzland-Kreis in Thuringia.

== Geography ==
Tauchlitz lies east of Crossen an der Elster and even east of the river Elster in the floodplain. The place is connected to the main road. 7 In the valley the railway Saalfeld / Saale-Gera-Leipzig leads past the Elster stopping in Crossen.

== History ==
On September 20, 1271 the documentary dated document has been archived. The place was and is dominated by agriculture.
