= George Albert II of Brandenburg =

Markgraf von Brandenburg (1591–1615)

George Albert II
- Margrave of Brandenburg
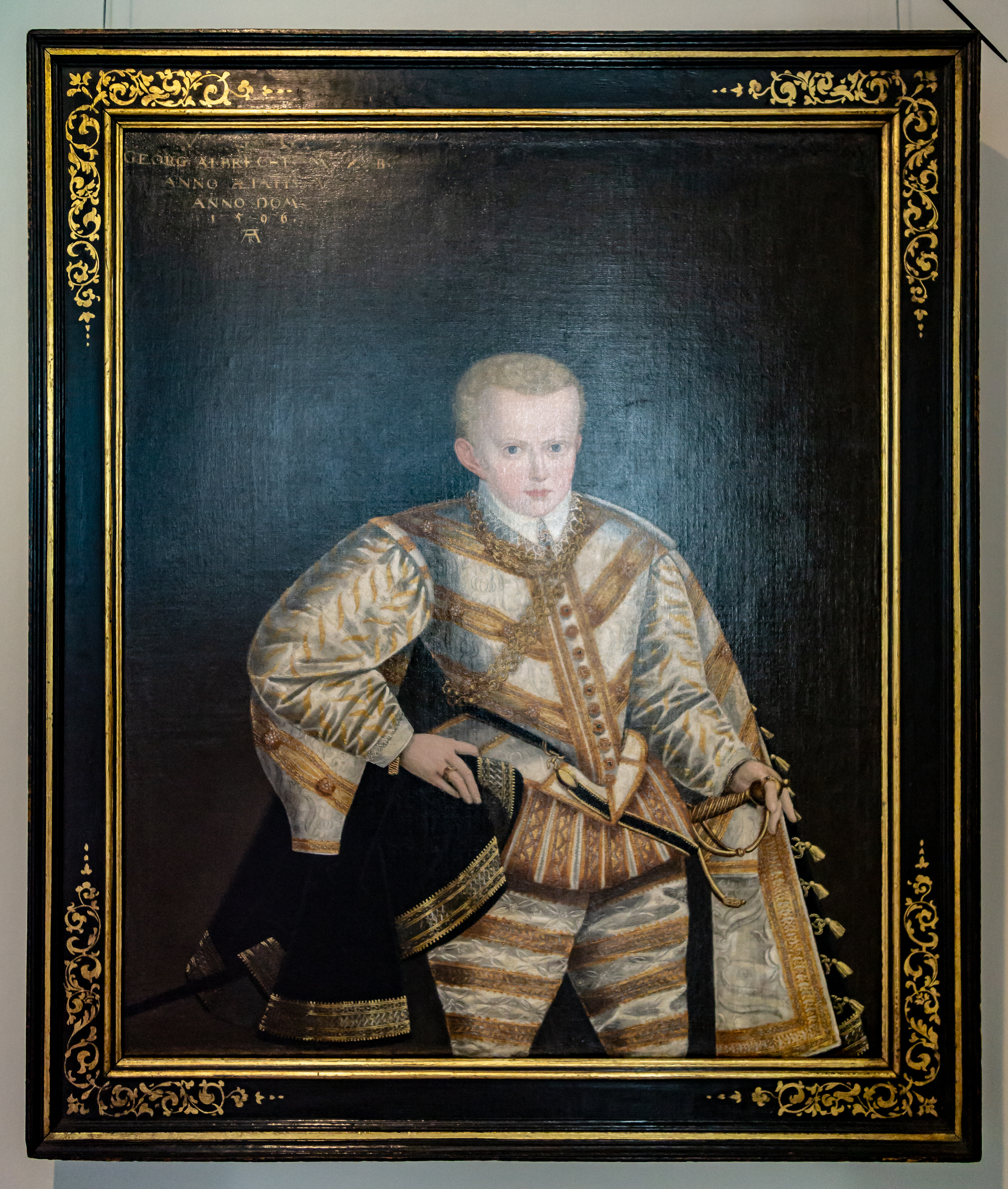
- Born: 20 November 1591; Berlin
- Died: 29 November 1615 (aged 24); Sonnenburg (present-day Słońsk)
- House: Hohenzollern
- Father: John George, Elector of Brandenburg
- Mother: Elisabeth of Anhalt-Zerbst

George Albert of Brandenburg (20 November 1591, in Berlin – 29 November 1615, in Sonnenburg, present-day Słońsk), was Margrave of Brandenburg as George Albert II.

== Life ==
George Albert was a member of the House of Hohenzollern. He was a son of the Elector John George of Brandenburg (1525–1598) from his third marriage to Elisabeth (1563–1607), daughter of Prince Joachim Ernest of Anhalt.

In 1614, he succeeded as Grand Master (Herrenmeister) of the Order of Saint John (Johanniterorden), seated at Sonnenburg, which his older brother Frederick had headed until his own early death. After an agreement with Electoral Brandenburg, George Albert received a fief from Duke Philipp Julius of Pomerania. In 1615, he confirmed the privileges of the city of Sulęcin (German: Zielenzig.

George Albert died of smallpox at the age of 24 and was buried in the parish church of Küstrin. His motto was: Mein Thun und Leben ist Gott ergeben ("My acts and my life are devoted to God").

== References and source ==
- Johann Samuel Ersch: Allgemeine Encyclopädie der Wissenschaften und Künste, J. f. Gleditsch, 1842, p. 429 (Digitized)
- Samuel Buchholtz: Versuch einer Geschichte der Churmarck Brandenburg von der ersten Erscheinung der deutschen Sennonen an bis auf jezige Zeiten, vols 3–4, F. W. Birnstiel, 1767, p. 490

George Albert II of Brandenburg House of Hohenzollern Born: 20 November 1591 Died: 29 November 1615
Preceded by Ernst, Markgraf zu Brandenburg	Herrenmeister (Grand Master) of the Order of Saint John; 1614-1615	Succeeded by Johann Georg, Markgraf zu Brandenburg
