= Heyking =

Surname list

Heyking is a surname. Notable people with the surname include:

- Elisabeth von Heyking (1861–1925), German novelist and travel writer
- Rüdiger von Heyking (1894–1956), German officer and Lieutenant General of the Luftwaffe during World War II
