= Louis IV of Legnica =

17th century Polish duke

Louis IV
- Duke of Brzeg, Wołów, Legnica
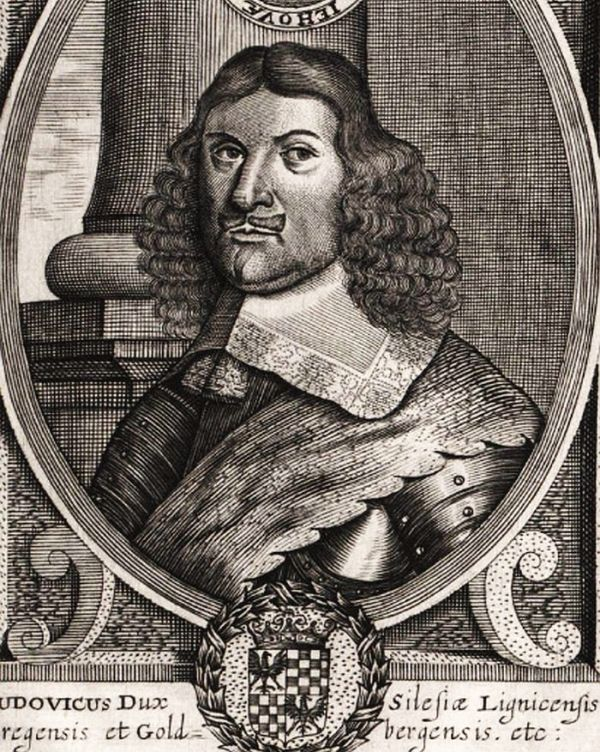
- Louis IV, Duke of Legnica
- Born: 19 April 1616; Brzeg
- Died: 24 November 1663 (aged 47); Legnica
- Noble family: Silesian Piasts
- Spouse: Anna Sophie of Mecklenburg
- Father: John Christian of Brieg
- Mother: Dorothea Sibylle of Brandenburg

Louis IV of Legnica (Polish: Ludwik; Brzeg, 19 April 1616 – Legnica, 24 November 1663) was a duke of Brzeg from 1633 (together with his brothers until 1654), of Wołów (during 1653–1654 with his brothers) and of Legnica from 1653 (until 1654 with his brothers, after this alone).

He was the fifth but second surviving son of John Christian, Duke of Brzeg-Legnica-Wołów-Oława, by his first wife, Dorothea Sibylle, daughter of John George, Elector of Brandenburg.

== Life ==
After the death of their father in 1639, Louis IV and his younger brother Christian inherited Brzeg and Oława together with their oldest brother George III, who had been appointed administrator of the Duchies by the Emperor six years before. After the death of their uncle George Rudolf in 1653 without issue, the brothers inherited his lands of Legnica and Wołów. In 1654, they decided to a division of their domains: Louis IV obtained Legnica, George III retained Brzeg, and Christian received the small towns of Oława and Wołów.

== Marriage and issue ==
In Brzeg on 8 May 1649, Louis IV married Anna Sophie (Harzgerode, 29 September 1628 - Prochowice, 10 February 1666), daughter of John Albert II, Duke of Mecklenburg-Güstrow by his third wife, Eleonore Maria of Anhalt-Bernburg, first cousin of Louis IV's father John Christian; thus, the spouses were second cousins. They had one son:

- Christian Albert (b. 7 November 1651 - d. 20 January 1652).

After his death without surviving issue, Louis IV was succeeded by his brothers George III and Christian. George III died soon thereafter, and Christian reunited all their lands under his rule.

Louis IV of Legnica House of Piast Born: 19 April 1616 Died: 24 November 1663
Preceded by John Christian	Duke of Brzeg; 1633–1654 with George III and Christian	Succeeded by George III
Preceded by John Christian	Duke of Oława; 1633–1654 with George III and Christian	Succeeded by Christian
Preceded by George Rudolf	Duke of Wołów; 1653–1654 with George III and Christian	Succeeded by Christian
Preceded by George Rudolf	Duke of Legnica; 1653–1663 with George III and Christian (1653-1654)	Succeeded by George III and Christian
