= George III of Brieg =

Duke of Brzeg

George III
- Duke of Brzeg. Legnica-Wołów
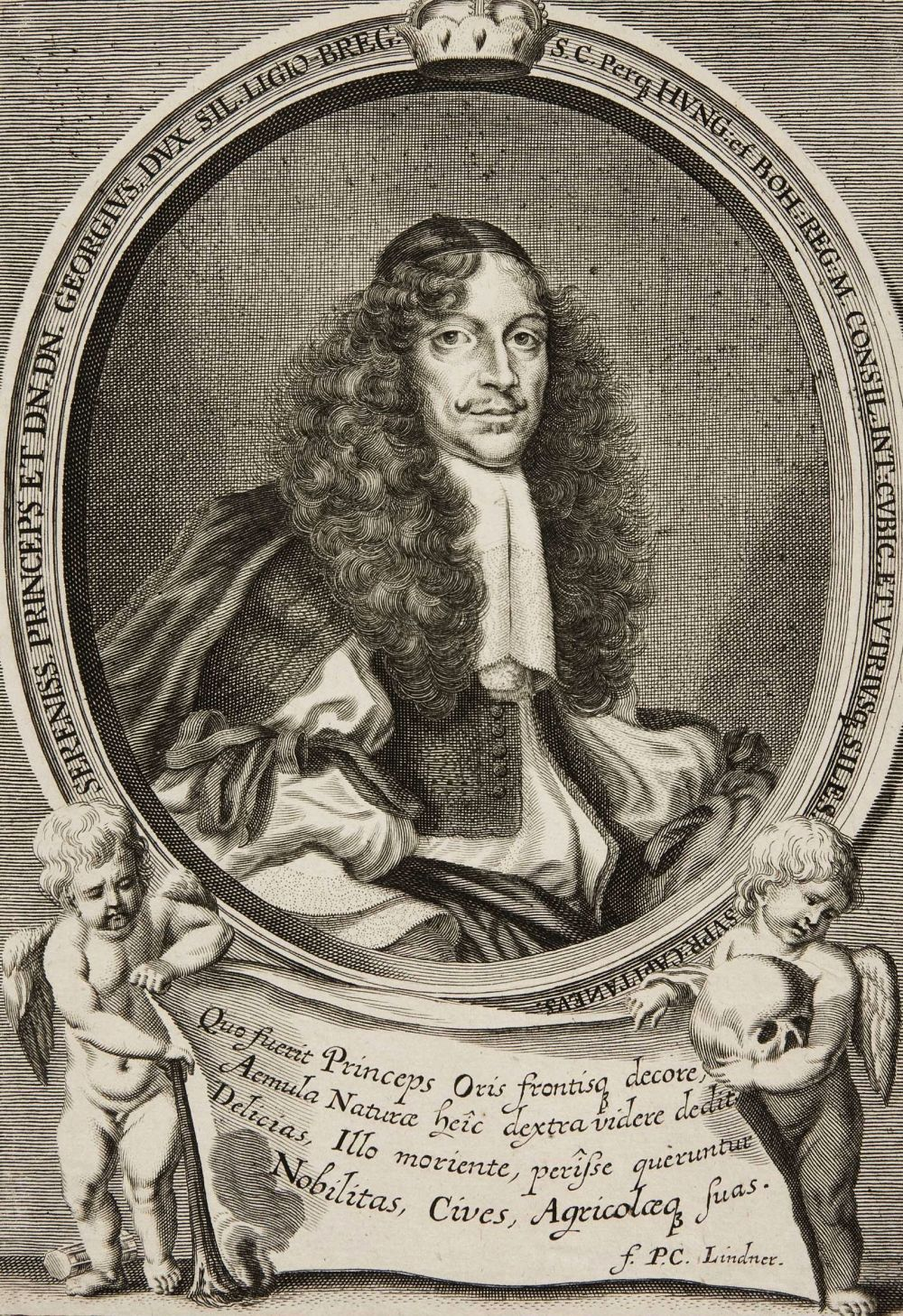
- Born: 4 September 1611; Brzeg
- Died: 4 July 1664 (aged 52); Brzeg
- Noble family: Silesian Piasts
- Spouses: Sophie Katharina of Münsterberg-Oels; Elisabeth Marie Charlotte of Simmern-Kaiserslautern
- Issue: Dorothea Elisabeth
- Father: John Christian of Brieg
- Mother: Dorothea Sibylle of Brandenburg

George III of Brieg (Polish: Jerzy III Brzeski; Brzeg, 4 September 1611 – Brzeg, 4 July 1664), was a Duke of Brzeg since 1633 (as administrator; in 1639 he took formally the title, together with his brothers until 1654) and Legnica-Wołów during 1653-1654 (with his brothers).

He was the eldest son of John Christian, Duke of Brzeg-Legnica-Wołów-Oława, by his first wife Dorothea Sybille, daughter of John George, Elector of Brandenburg.

== Life ==
The invasion of the Imperial troops in Brzeg (1633), forced the escape of John Christian and his morganatic family to Poland. In 1635, Emperor Ferdinand II entrusted George III the administration of Brzeg during the absence of his father, who never returned home.

John Christian died in 1639 and George III, together with his two only surviving brothers Louis IV and Christian inherited Brzeg and Oława. After the death of their uncle George Rudolf in 1653, the brothers inherited Legnica and Wołów; however, only one year later (1654), they decided to make a formal division of their domains: George III retained Brzeg, Louis IV obtained Legnica and Christian received the small towns of Oława and Wołów. When his brother Louis IV died without surviving issue in 1663, George III and Christian inherited Legnica together as co-rulers.

== Marriages and issue ==
In Bierutów on 23 February 1638, George III married firstly with Sophie Katharina (b. Oleśnica, 2 September 1601 – d. Brzeg, 21 March 1659), daughter of Charles II, Duke of Ziębice-Oleśnica by his wife Elisabeth Magdalena of Brieg, sister of George III's grandfather Joachim Frederick; thus, she was his first cousin once removed. They had one daughter:

1. Dorothea Elisabeth (b. Wroclaw, 17 December 1646 – d. Dillenburg, 9 June 1691), married on 13 October 1663 to Henry, Prince of Nassau-Dillenburg.

In Brzeg on 19 October 1660, George III married secondly with Elisabeth Marie Charlotte (b. Sedan, 23 October 1638 – d. Brzeg, 22 May 1664), daughter of Louis Philip, Count Palatine of Simmern-Kaiserslautern and niece of Frederick V, Elector Palatine, who was briefly King of Bohemia. The marriage was childless.

George III survived his second wife by only two months. After his death without male issue, his lands were inherited by his only surviving brother, Christian, who then reunited all their lands under his rule.

George III of Brieg House of Piast Born: 4 September 1611 Died: 4 July 1664
Preceded by John Christian	Duke of Brzeg with Louis IV and Christian (until 1654); 1633–1664	Succeeded by Christian
Preceded by John Christian	Duke of Oława with Louis IV and Christian; 1633–1654	Succeeded by Christian
Preceded by George Rudolf	Duke of Wołów with Louis IV and Christian; 1653–1654	Succeeded by Christian
Preceded by George Rudolf	Duke of Legnica with Louis IV and Christian; 1653–1654	Succeeded by Louis IV
Preceded by Louis IV	Duke of Legnica with Christian; 1663–1664	Succeeded by Christian
