= Frederick of Brandenburg =

Frederick of Brandenburg may refer to:

- Frederick I, Elector of Brandenburg (1371–1440)
- Frederick II, Elector of Brandenburg (1413–1471), son of previous
- Frederick I, Margrave of Brandenburg-Ansbach (1460–1536)
- Frederick of Brandenburg (1530–1552), Prince-Archbishop of Magdeburg
- Frederick IX, Margrave of Brandenburg (1588–1611)
- Frederick III, Margrave of Brandenburg-Ansbach (1616–1634)
- Elector Frederick III of Brandenburg who became King Frederick I of Prussia (1657–1713)
- Frederick, Margrave of Brandenburg-Bayreuth (1711–1763)
- Elector Frederick IV of Brandenburg, also King Frederick II of Prussia (1712–1786)
