= Dorothea Sibylle of Brandenburg =

Dorothea Sibylle of Brandenburg (German: Dorothea Sibylle von Brandenburg) (19 October 1590 — 9 March 1625) was a Duchess of Brieg by marriage. She was a daughter of John George, Elector of Brandenburg by his third wife, Elisabeth of Anhalt-Zerbst. She was also known as Duchess Dorothea Sibylla of Liegnitz and Brieg, and was born as the Margravine of Brandenburg.

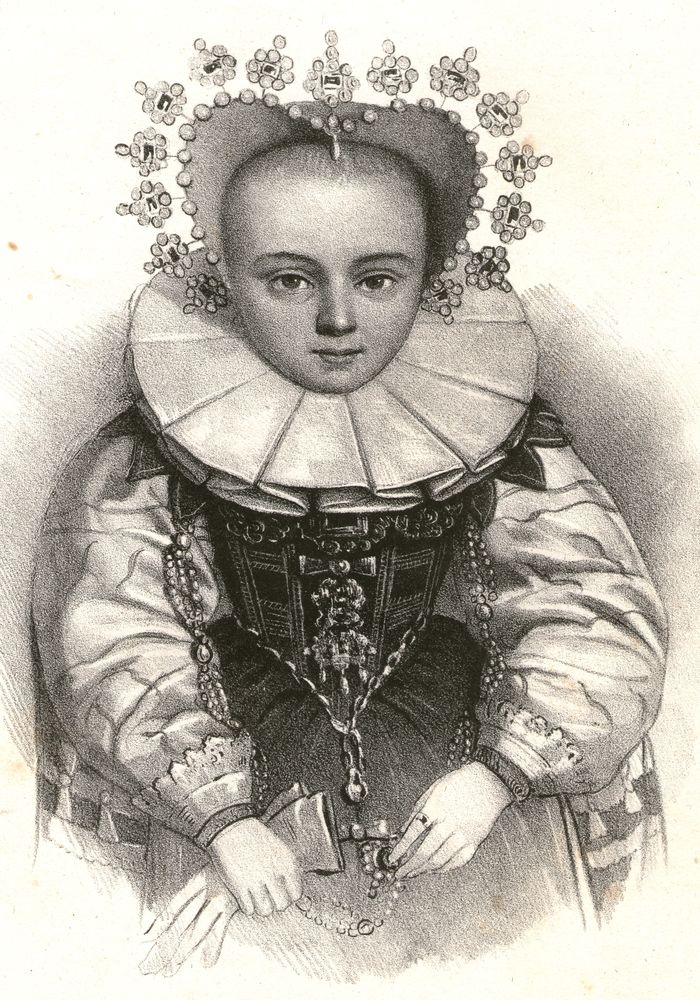
Dorothea Sibylle, Duchess of Brieg

== Life ==
Born in Berlin, Dorothea Sibylle was the fourth and youngest daughter of her parents. After her father died in 1598, she grew up in her mother's estate, Crossen (in present-day Poland).

On 12 December 1610, Dorothea Sibylle married her maternal cousin, Duke John Christian of Brieg. She was described as "kind, and religious". She also played a crucial role in her husband's conversion to Calvinism in 1613.

Dorothea Sibylle and John Christian had the following children:

1. George III (4 September 1611 - 4 July 1664)
2. Joachim (20 December 1612 - 9 February 1613)
3. Henry (3 February 1614 - 4 February 1614)
4. Ernest (3 February 1614 - 4 February 1614)
5. Anna Elisabeth (23 March 1615 - 28 March 1616)
6. Louis IV (19 April 1616 - 24 November 1663)
7. Rudolf (6 April 1617 - 8 February 1633)
8. Christian (9 April 1618 - 28 February 1672)
9. August (18 March 1619 - 12 March 1620)
10. Sibylle Margareta (20 June 1620 - 26 June 1657)
11. Dorothea (16 August 1622 - 26 August 1622)
12. Agnes (16 August 1622 - 3 September 1622)
13. Sophia Magdalena (14 June 1624 - 28 April 1660)
