= Elizabeth of Doberschütz =

- Died: 17 December 1591; Stettin, Pomerania
- Spouse: Melchior of Doberschütz

Elizabeth of Doberschütz, (or Dobschütz) née von Strantz (died 17 December 1591 in Stettin, Pomerania) (modern Szczecin) was beheaded as a witch on the Hay Market in Stettin and burned on the outskirts of the city.

== Witch hunt ==
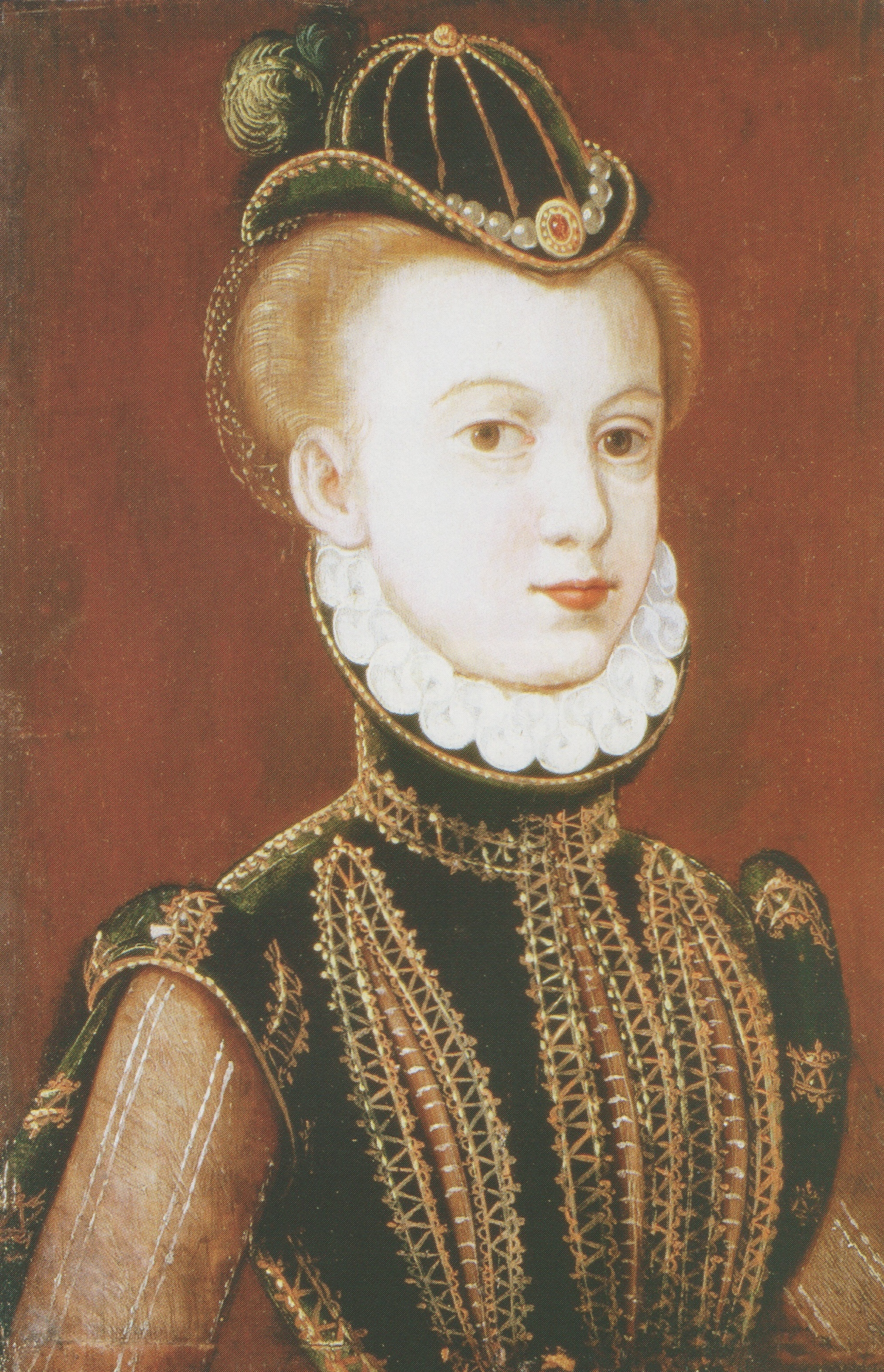
Erdmuthe of Pomerania, to whom Doberschütz was alleged to have given a "witch potion"

Elizabeth of Doberschütz was accused of witchcraft and magic in 1590: she was accused of having treated Erdmuthe of Brandenburg, the wife of Duke John Frederick of Pomerania-Stettin (1542–1600) with a "witch potion" which had made the Duchess infertile. Elizabeth had sent this potion to the Duchess years ago to reduce fever after the Duchess had suffered a miscarriage. The Duke had been married since 1577 to Princess Erdmuthe of Brandenburg (1561–1623), daughter of the elector John George of Brandenburg and Sabine of Brandenburg-Ansbach and the marriage was childless. Doberschütz managed to escape, but she was arrested in Krossen (Krosno Odrzańskie) where she had fled with her husband. She was imprisoned in Stettin, and on 17 December 1590 sentenced to death. Exactly one year later, on 17 December 1591, she was beheaded as a witch on the Hay Market in Stettin and then burned at the stake on the outskirts of the city, in the year in which the witch hunts had reached their peak.

== Background ==
Elizabeth's persecution as a witch is seen today as a result of political intrigue: Elisabeth had married Melchior of Doberschütz, lord of Plau in the Landkreis Crossen (Oder) in Brandenburg. But Doberschütz was in debt, and in 1585, he went back into the services of John Frederick, Duke of Pomerania. Until 1584, he was city governor of the city of Neustettin. His wife seems to have been accused of witchcraft as early as 1584 for reasons of political envy. In 1590, Melchior finally fell out of favor, due to defamation and his wife again being accused of witchcraft. He was banned from Pomerania.

The deliberate slander ultimately led to Elizabeth's arrest and conviction. The case file also shows, for example, that her painful thrift and uncaring severity had greatly strengthened the hatred of the maids and servants. She was alleged to have given poisoned drinks to the duke's High marshal Peter von Kameke and other court officials and to the Duke himself, that had taken their wits and senses, in order to win their favour for herself or her husband.

She was also alleged to have been very superstitious and to have had "some strange habits" and to have conversed with other witches even while in prison. They were tortured and forced to slander and testify against her, and that testimony eventually led to Elizabeth's death sentence. This was masterminded by Jacob von Kleist, her husband's rival for the Duke's favor and his successor as city governor of Neustettin. During his term as city governor (1584–1594), several more alleged witches were executed.
