= Leonhard Thurneysser =

German Courtier

Leonard Thurneysser
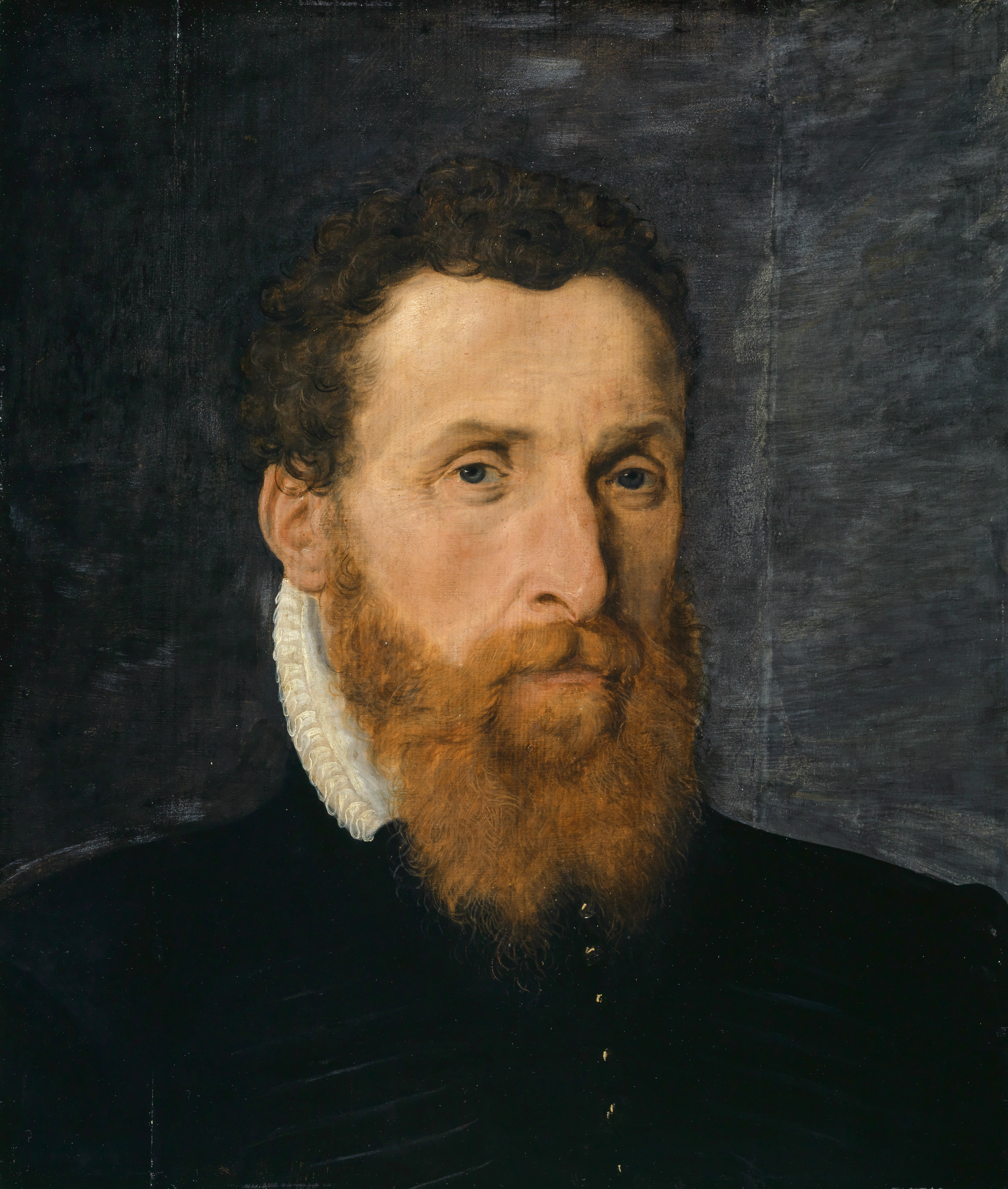
- Portrait by Frans Floris, c. 1569
- Born: 22 July 1531; Basel
- Died: 1595 or 1596; Cologne
- Other name: Leonard Thurneysser zum Thurn
- Scientific career
- Fields: Pharmacy, chemistry, metallurgy, botany, mathematics, astronomy, medicine

Signature
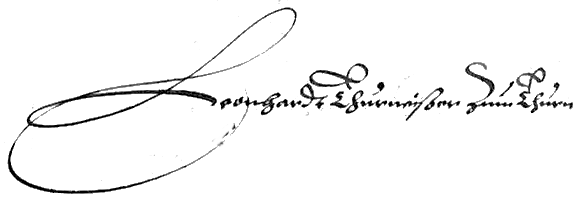

Leonard Thurneysser (22 July 1531 – 1595 or 1596; also known as Leonard Thurneisser zum Thurn) was a Swiss-German scholar and miracle doctor at the court of Elector John George of Brandenburg.

== Life ==
Thurneysser was born in Basel, the son of a goldsmith. He learned the goldsmith's craft and developed an interest in the mineralogy and alchemy. He also served the Medical Professor John Huber as Famulus and helped to gather and prepare herbs and medicines. He later used this knowledge in his book Historia. While he worked with Huber, Thurneysser also had access to the writings of Paracelsus, which impressed him deeply.

From 1547 led Leonhard Thurneysser a wandering life until he married in 1555 in his native Basel. He was a member of the "guild of the household" (money changers and goldsmiths). However Thurneysser 1558 went back on tour.

In 1559 he operated successfully as a metallurgist in Tarrenz in Tyrol and became the owner of a mine. Soon Thurneysser was considered by Emperor Ferdinand I and his sons, as well as personalities such as scholars Pietro Paolo Vergerio and Gerolamo Cardano and others as an expert in the areas of the Pharmaceutical, chemistry, metallurgy, botany, mathematics, astronomy and medicine. Philippine Welser, the wife of Ferdinand II of Habsburg, Archduke of Tyrol commissioned Thurneysser to make more journeys, including through the East and North Africa. He collected minerals, plants and medicinal recipes. After these journeys, he no longer saw himself as a metallurgist, but he practiced as a pharmaceutical doctor.

From 1569 to 1570 Leonard Thurneysser lived in Münster. The local bishop John IV of Hoya ordered his physician Thurneysser to set up a pharmacy, but Thurneysser's imagination exceeded the financial capabilities of the bishop.

Thurneysser first met Elector John George of Brandenburg in Frankfurt an der Oder, where Thurneysser had healed the Elector's ailing wife. John George appointed him his personal doctor and took him for Berlin at a salary of 1352 Taler. For his work, John George made part of the former Franciscan monastery (today known as the Grey Abbey available to Thurneysser. Thurneysser also led the construction of a glass studio at Grimnitz Castle.

In the Grey Abbey, Leonhard Thurneysser organized his home, his library, a printing company and his laboratory. He became wealthy by selling medicine of his own creation, as well as astrological calendars, horoscopes and talismans for protection against evil. He claimed to know places in the margraviate of Brandenburg where sapphires, rubies and emeralds were to be found, and that gold could be found in the mud of the Spree river. In his print shop, he produced writings in various scripts, including German, Latin, Greek, Hebrew and Arabic script. He created the first scientific curiosity cabinet in Brandenburg and a botanical garden and he kept exotic animals at court.

A turning point in his life was his journey to his home town of Basel in 1579. He married his third wife and took much of his wealth to Basel. After violent disputes with his wife, Leonhard Thurneysser returned to Berlin, but most of his property was confiscated and awarded to his wife. In 1584, he left Berlin for good and was baptized into the Catholic Church. He briefly lived in Rome.

In 1595 he died impoverished in a monastery near Cologne, in unexplained circumstances. On 8 July 1596, he was buried in the Dominican Preacher Monastery ad latus Alberti Magni in Cologne.

== Works ==
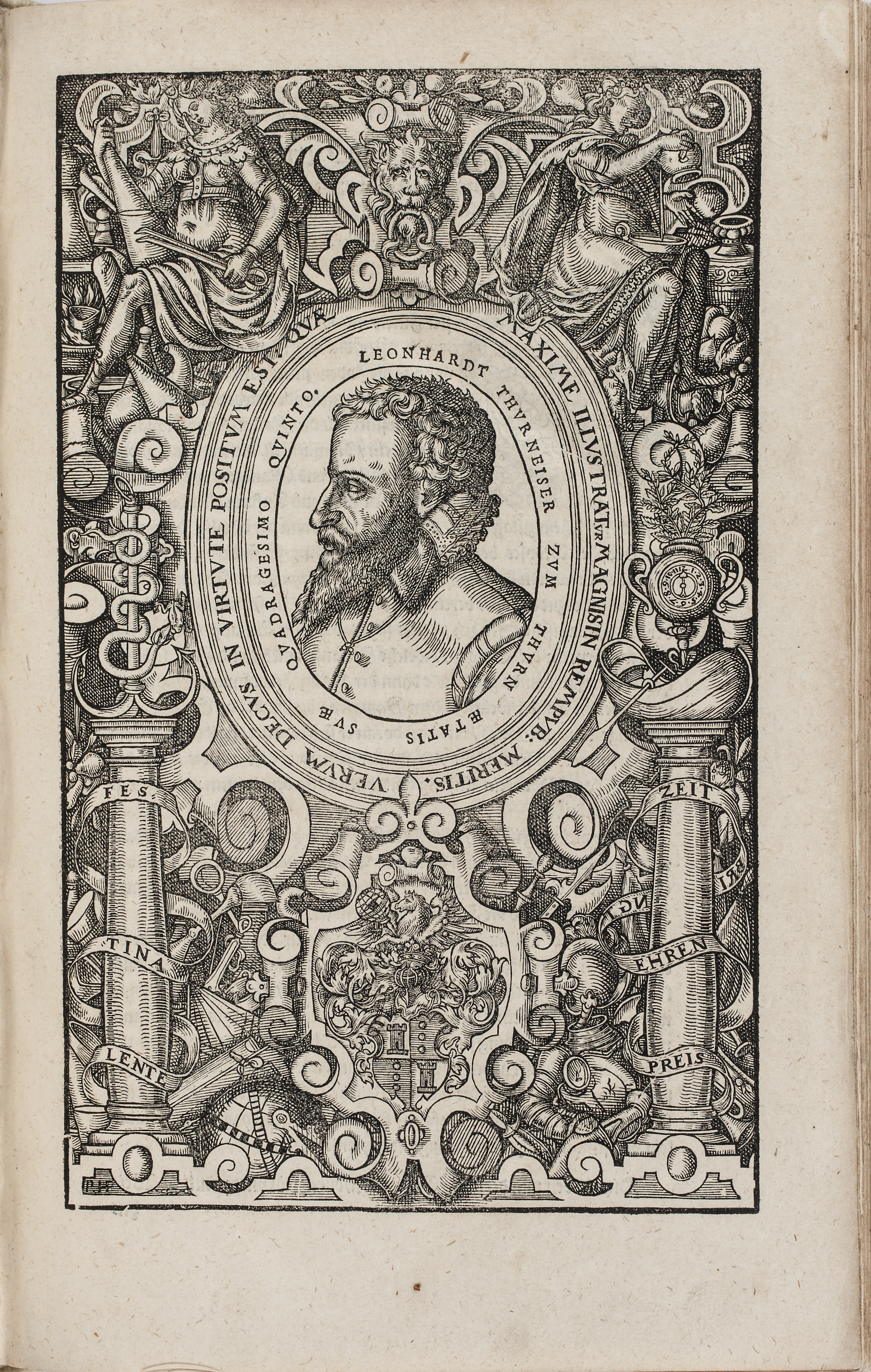
The author in Archidoxa, 1575.

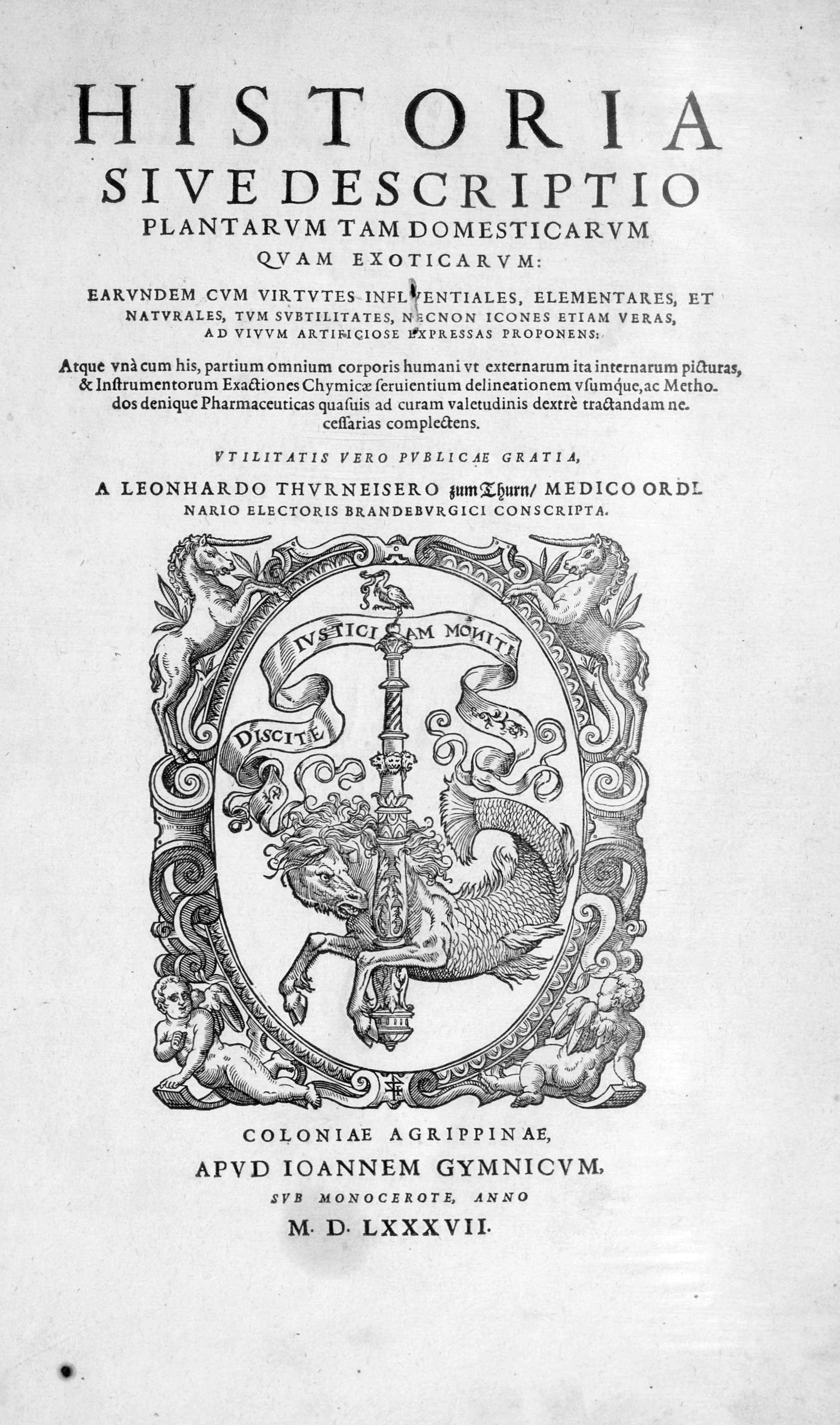
Historia sive descriptio plantarum tam domesticarum quam exoticarum, 1587

Among the most impressive books from his shop and at the same time one of his major works, was his Archidoxa: a large book in the form of an astrolabe with tables of the planets. If used correctly, it was alleged to enable the user to predict his fate or natural disasters. The graphic design was accomplished by etcher, woodcutter and illustrator Jost Amman. The full title of the second edition in the spelling of the day, was:

Archidoxa. Dorin der recht war Motus, Lauff vnd Gang auch heimligkeit, Wirckung vnd Krafft der Planeten Gstirns vnd gantzen Firmaments Mutierung vnd ausziechung aller Subtiliteten vnd das Fünffte wesen auss den Metallen sampt dem auszug vnd Verstandt des Astrolabij vnd aller Zircklen Caracter vnd Zeichen.
Zum andern mal vnd jetz von newen gemert vnd sampt dem verstand der Caracter an tag geben. Durch Leonhart Thurneisser zum Thurn. Churfürstlichen Brandenburgischen Bestalten Leibs Medicum. Berlin: Im Grawen Closter. 1575

Translation:

Archidoxa. Containing the truth about the modus, course and trajectory and the secrets of the influence and power of the planets and stars and mutations of the whole firmament and explanations of all subtilities of the fifth metal being and an abstract and understanding of the astrolabe and all circles, characters and signs.
Improved and extended again, now including an comprehension of characters. Published by Leonhart Thurneisser zum Thurn, Appointed Personal Doctor of the Elector of Brandenburg. In the Gray Monastery, Berlin, 1575.

He also wrote an encyclopedia similar to the 1583 brochure Magna Alchymia, which included a dictionary of terms used by Paracelsus. This document also contained a collection of his mineralogical knowledge.

== Editions ==
- Pison (in German). Frankfurt an der Oder: Johann Eichorn. 1572.
- Historia sive descriptio plantarum tam domesticarum quam exoticarum (in Latin). Köln: Johann Gymnich (3.). 1587.
