= Elisabeth von Heyking =

German writer (1861–1925)

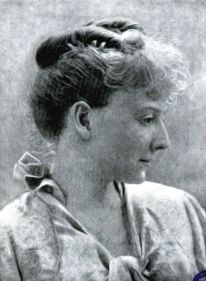
Elisabeth von Heyking

Elisabeth von Heyking (10 December 1861 – 4 January 1925) was a German novelist, travel writer and diarist. She is known for her best-selling 1903 novel Briefe, die ihn nicht erreichten (Letters Which Never Reached Him) and her travel diaries, published posthumously in 1926.

== Biography ==
Elisabeth von Flemming was born in Karlsruhe in 1861, the daughter of the Prussian diplomat Albert von Flemming and Armgard von Arnim. Her maternal grandparents were the writers Bettina and Ludwig Achim von Arnim. In 1881, she married the economist Stephan Gans zu Putlitz; he committed suicide in 1883 after discovering that she was romantically involved with another man, and the resulting three-year custody battle between Flemming and Putlitz's family was reported in the tabloid press.

Flemming married the diplomat Edmund Friedrich Gustav von Heyking in 1884. They lived abroad from 1886 and 1903 as he took up diplomatic posts in Beijing, Valparaiso, Cairo, New York, Calcutta, Stockholm, St Petersburg, and Mexico. During this time, Elisabeth kept a travel diary that would eventually be published after her death with the title Tagebücher aus vier Weltteilen (Diaries from Four Continents, 1926).

Heyking's debut novel, Briefe, die ihn nicht erreichten (Letters That Never Reached Him), was serialised in the Berlin newspaper Tägliche Rundschau in 1902 and published in 1903. The novel, which is set during the outbreak of the Boxer Rebellion, sold out within three weeks of its first printing. It became a best-seller and was reprinted more than 40 times in its first year of publication. None of Heyking's subsequent books—Der Tag anderer (1905), Ille mihi (1912), Tschun (1914), Die Orgelpfeifen (1918), Liebe, Diplomatie und Holzhäuser (1919), Das vollkommene Glück (1920), and Weberin Schuld (1921)—were as popular as the first.

Heyking's husband and two sons died during World War I. She spent her later life in Crossen Palace and died of a stroke in 1925 while visiting a friend in Berlin.
