= Julius Henry, Duke of Saxe-Lauenburg =

Julius Henry
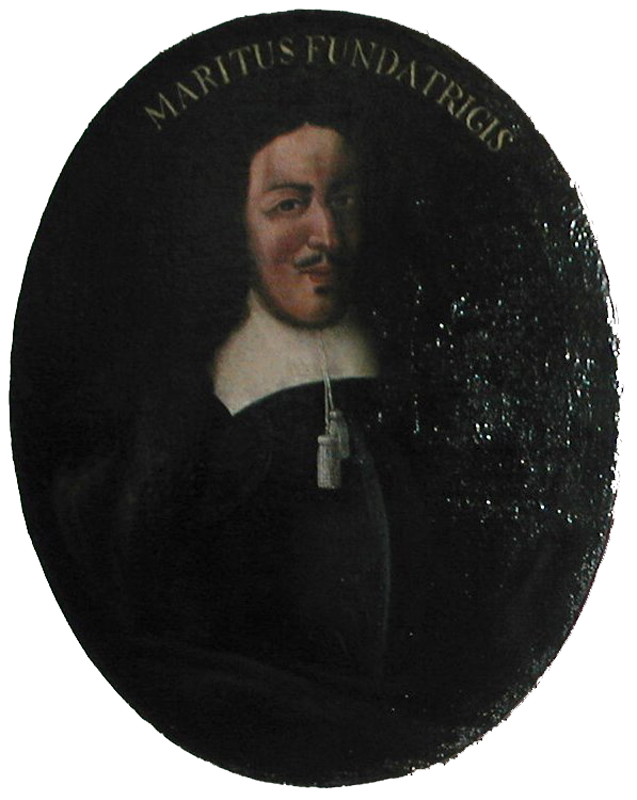
- Contemporary portrait (17th century)

Duke of Saxe-Lauenburg
- Reign: 1656 – 1665
- Predecessor: Augustus
- Successor: Francis Erdmann
- Born: 9 April 1586; Wolfenbüttel
- Died: 20 November 1665 (aged 79); Prague
- Spouses: Anna of East Frisia; Elisabeth Sophia of Brandenburg; Anna Magdalena of Lobkowicz
- Issue more...: Francis Erdmann; Julius Francis
- House: House of Ascania
- Father: Francis II
- Mother: Maria of Brunswick-Lüneburg
- Religion: Lutheran, after 1615 Catholic

Julius Henry (9 April 1586 – 20 November 1665) was duke of Saxe-Lauenburg between 1656 and 1665. Before ascending to the throne he served as Field Marshal in the imperial army.

== Life ==
=== Before regency ===
Born at Wolfenbüttel, he was a son of Duke Francis II and his second wife Maria, daughter of Duke Julius of Brunswick and Lunenburg (Wolfenbüttel). Julius Henry studied at the University of Tübingen and later entered into the service of King Gustavus Adolphus of Sweden. Expecting an appointment to the Prince-Bishopric of Osnabrück, he converted to Roman Catholicism as a young man.

In imperial service, Julius Henry commanded a regiment in the Uskok War against the Republic of Venice in 1617, and afterwards he led a regiment in Hungary. Julius Henry fought in the Battle of the White Mountain. As chamberlain of Emperor Ferdinand II, he was sent as an envoy to King Christian IV of Denmark and Norway. In 1619, Julius Henry, a certain Count of Altheim, and Charles Gonzaga founded the Order of the Conception (Italian: Ordine della Concezione), papally confirmed in 1624.

In 1623, the emperor transferred the lordship in Schlackenwerth (today Ostrov), which he had deprived from the Schlick family disgraced after participating in the insurgency defeated at the White Mountain, to Julius Henry. He commissioned the construction of the "White Palace" (Weißes Schloss / Bílý zámek) next to the old palace of the Schlicks. Julius Henry made the White Palace his domicile.

In 1629 Julius Henry was given supreme command over the imperial troops in Poland and in this position he negotiated a peace with John George I, Elector of Saxony in 1632, after the latter had refused to join a Lutheran war coalition under Gustavus Adolphus. Julius Henry was considered a confidant and close friend of Albrecht von Wallenstein. Thus Julius Henry was a suspected accomplice in Wallenstein's assaults against the emperor. After Ferdinand had successfully instigated Wallenstein's murder, the suspects were arrested, including Julius Henry and incarcerated in Vienna.

Julius Henry successfully denied the competence of the imperial judicial commission which inquired against him, insisting on his status of immediate prince of the empire only to be judged by a college of his like. After the Peace of Prague in 1635 Ferdinand II released Julius Henry from imprisonment. After the accession of Emperor Ferdinand III in 1637 Julius Henry was again envoyed in several diplomatic missions.

=== Ruling Saxe-Lauenburg ===
In 1656, Julius Henry succeeded his elder half-brother Augustus as Duke of Saxe-Lauenburg. Upon his ascension, he confirmed the existing privileges of the nobility and the estates of the realm. In 1658 he forbade his vassals to pledge, or else alienate fiefs, thus taking a stance against the integration of manor estates in Saxe-Lauenburg into the monetary economies of the neighbouring city-states of Hamburg and Lübeck. He engaged in further disputes with both city-states over Saxe-Lauenburg aligned manor estates which were increasingly falling into the Hanseatic sphere of influence.

In 1659, Duke Julius Henry decreed in his general disposition (guide-lines for his government) "to also esteem the woodlands as heart and dwell [of revenues] of the Monarchy of Lower Saxony (Saxe-Lauenburg)." From 1659 onwards Julius Henry employed Johannes Kunckel as head of the ducal pharmacy.

In 1663, Julius Henry bought the castle in Hauenstein (Bohemia) from the von Schlick family, integrating it into the ducal Schlackenwerth domain. He later acquired the lordship of Ploschkowitz.

Julius Henry died of age in Prague in 1665, and was buried in Schlackenwerth.

=== Marriages and issue ===
Julius Henry married three times: He married in Grabow (1) Countess Anna of East Frisia on 7 March 1617. They had no children.

On 27 February 1628, he married in Theusing (2) Elisabeth Sophia of Brandenburg (Berlin, *13 July 1589 – 24 December 1629*, Frankfurt an der Oder), daughter of John George, Elector of Brandenburg and widow of Reichsfürst Janusz Radziwiłł. Julius Henry and Elisabeth Sophia had one son:

- Francis Erdmann of Saxony, Angria and Westphalia (Lauenburg) (Theusing, *25 February 1629 – 30 July 1666*, Schwarzenbek), duke of Saxe-Lauenburg between 1665 and 1666

Julius Henry's last wedding took place in Vienna on 18 August 1632 with (3) Anna Magdalena of Lobkowicz (*20 July 1606 – 7 September 1668*), daughter of Baron William the Younger Popel von Lobkowitz (Popel z Lobkowicz). Anna Magdalena was the only wife to officiate as Duchess of Saxe-Lauenburg, after her husband had ascended the throne on 18 January 1656. They had six children, however, only two survived infancy:

- Julius Henry (1633–1634)
- Francisca (d./b. 1634)
- Maria Benigna Francisca (Ratisbon, *10 July 1635 – 1 December 1701*, Vienna); ∞ on 4 June 1651 Ottavio Piccolomini.
- Francis William (d./b. 1639)
- Francisca Elisabeth (d./b. 1640)
- Julius Francis (Prague, *16 September 1641 – 30 September 1689*, Reichstadt), duke between 1666 and 1689

== Ancestry ==
Ancestors of Julius Henry, Duke of Saxe-Lauenburg

16. John V, Duke of Saxe-Lauenburg
8. Magnus I, Duke of Saxe-Lauenburg
17. Dorothea of Brandenburg
4. Francis I, Duke of Saxe-Lauenburg
18. Henry IV, Duke of Brunswick and Lunenburg (Wolfenbüttel) (=#24)
9. Catherine of Brunswick and Lunenburg (Wolfenbüttel)
19. Catherine of Pomerania-Wolgast (=#25)
2. Francis II, Duke of Saxe-Lauenburg
20. Albert, Duke of Saxony
10. Henry IV the Pious, Duke of Saxe-Freiberg
21. Sidonie Podiebrad
5. Sybille of Saxe-Freiberg
22. Magnus II, Duke of Mecklenburg-Schwerin
11. Catherine of Mecklenburg-Schwerin
23. Sophia of Pomerania-Wolgast
1. Julius Henry, Duke of Saxe-Lauenburg
24. Henry IV, Duke of Brunswick and Lunenburg (Wolfenbüttel) (=#18)
12. Henry V, Duke of Brunswick and Lunenburg (Wolfenbüttel)
25. Catherine of Pomerania-Wolgast (=#19)
6. Julius, Duke of Brunswick and Lunenburg (Wolfenbüttel)
26. Henry, Count of Württemberg-Mömpelgard
13. Mary of Württemberg-Mömpelgard
27. Elisabeth of Zweibrücken-Bitsch
3. Maria of Brunswick-Lüneburg
28. Joachim I Nestor, Elector of Brandenburg
14. Joachim II Hector, Elector of Brandenburg
29. Elizabeth of Denmark, Norway, and Sweden
7. Hedwig of Brandenburg
30. Sigismund I the Old
15. Hedwig Jagiellon
31. Barbara Zápolya

== Notes ==
Julius Henry, Duke of Saxe-Lauenburg House of Ascania Born: 9 April 1586 in Wolfenbüttel Died: 20 November 1665 in Prague
Regnal titles
Preceded by Augustus	Duke of Saxe-Lauenburg; 1656 – 1665	Succeeded by Francis Erdmann
