= Elisabeth Sophia of Brandenburg =

- Princess of Saxe-Lauenburg
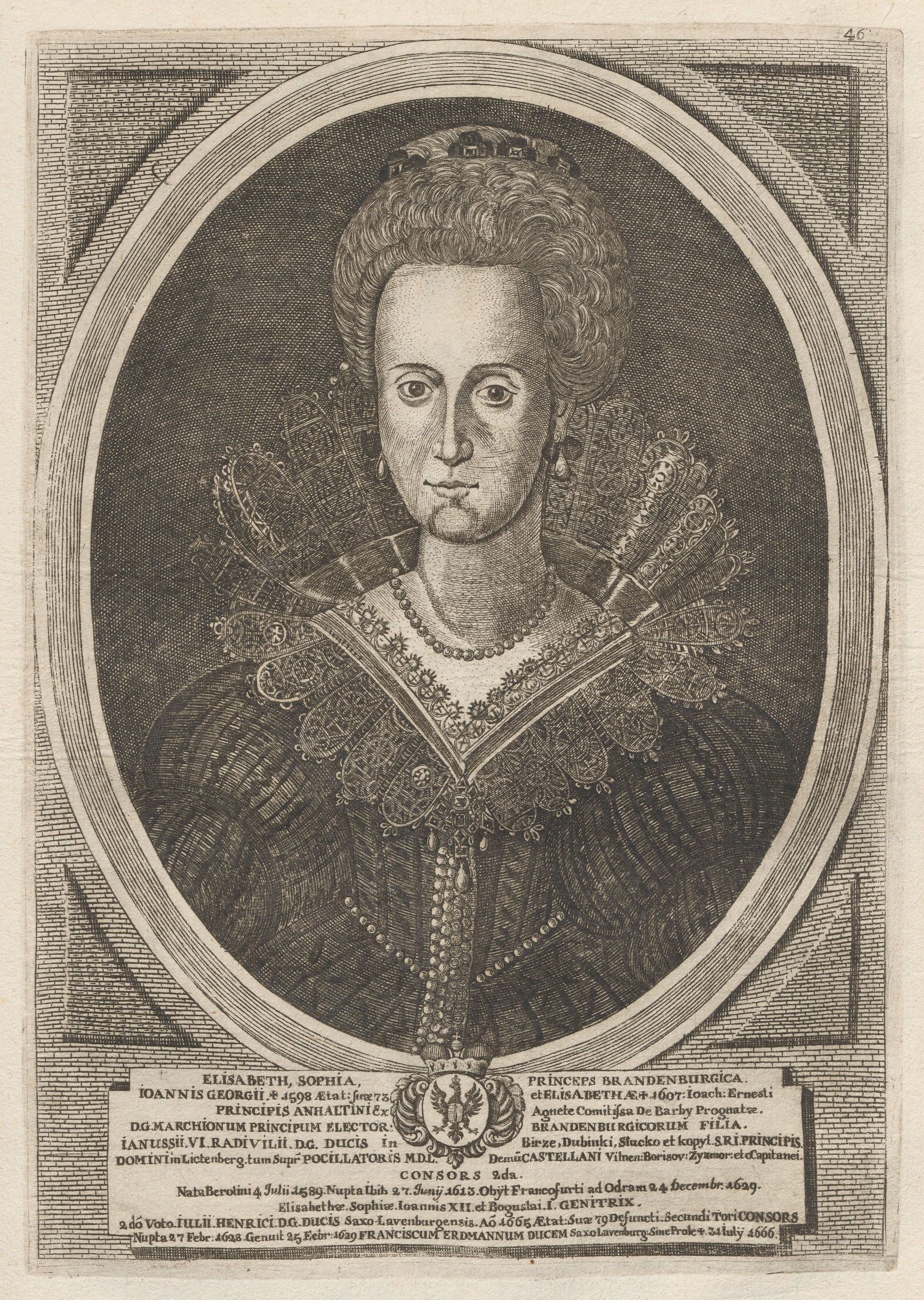
- Elisabeth Sophia in 1607
- Born: 13 July 1589; Berlin or Colln, Margraviate of Brandenburg
- Died: 24 December 1629 (age 40); Frankfurt an der Oder, Margraviate of Brandenburg
- Spouse: Janusz Radziwill (m. 1613; died 1620) Julius Henry, Duke of Saxe-Lauenburg (m. 1620)
- Issue: Boguslaw Radziwill; Elizabeth Eleanor Radziwill; John George Radziwill; Sophia Agnes Radziwill; Francis Erdmann
Names
- Elisabeth Sofie Hohenzollern von Brandenburg
- House: Hohenzollern
- Father: John George, Elector of Brandenburg
- Mother: Elisabeth of Anhalt-Zerbst

Elisabeth Sophia Hohenzollern von Brandenburg, commonly known as Elisabeth Sophia of Brandenburg (13 July 1589 – 24 December 1629), was a Princess of Brandenburg and the daughter of John George, Elector of Brandenburg, and his third wife, Elisabeth of Anhalt-Zerbst. Elisabeth Sophia married twice, with her second marriage she became Princess of Saxe-Lauenburg. She was never Duchess of Saxe-Lauenburg as she died before her husbands accession. She lived to the age of forty, dying on Christmas Eve 1629.

== Biography ==
=== Early life ===
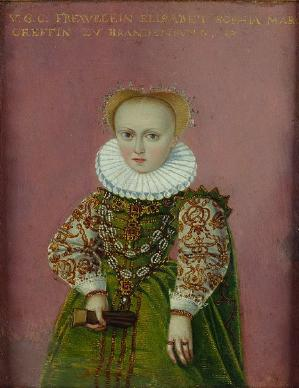
Portrait of Elisabeth Sophia completed in 1593, around the age of four

Elisabeth Sophia was born on 13 July 1589, either in Berlin or in the adjacent city of Cölln, both of which were then located in the Margraviate of Brandenburg.

=== First marriage ===
On 27 March 1613, Elisabeth Sophia was married in Berlin to Janusz Radziwiłł, a Polish noble who had been widowed the previous year by his wife, Zofia Olelkowicz Słucka. On 3 May 1620, Elisabeth Sophia gave birth to Bogusław Radziwiłł, who would go on to govern the Duchy of Prussia. Elisabeth Sophia bore three other children during this marriage, Elizabeth Eleanor, John George, and Sophia Agnes, but records of these children are not available, and it is likely that all but Bogusław died in infancy. Janusz died on 3 December 1620, leaving Elisabeth Sophia a widowed mother at the age of 31.

=== Second marriage ===
On 27 February 1628, Elisabeth Sophia entered into another marriage, this time with Julius Henry, Duke of Saxe-Lauenburg. On 25 February 1629, Elisabeth Sophia gave birth to another son, Francis Erdmann, Julius Henry's heir to the Duchy of Saxe-Lauenburg.

=== Death and burial ===
Elisabeth Sophia died in Frankfurt an der Oder on 24 December 1629, at the age of forty.
