= Krásný Les (Karlovy Vary District) =

- Municipality
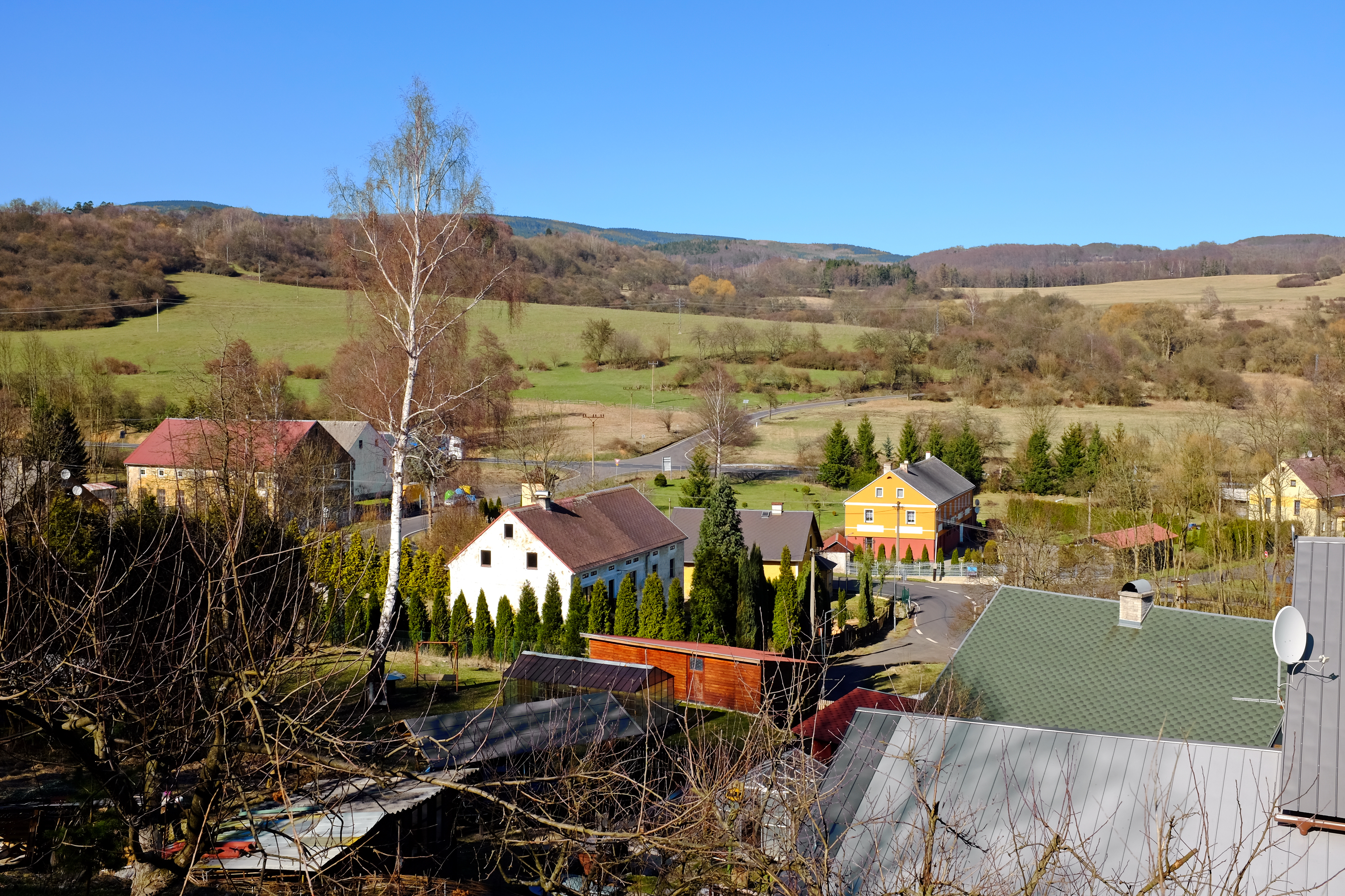
- Damice, a part of Krásný Les

- Location in the Czech Republic
- Coordinates: 50°20′42″N 13°0′10″E
- Country: Czech Republic
- Region: Karlovy Vary
- District: Karlovy Vary
- First mentioned: 1226

Area
  - Total: 22.71 km^{2} (8.77 sq mi)
- Elevation: 542 m (1,778 ft)

Population (2026-01-01)
  - Total: 361
  - Density: 15.9/km^{2} (41.2/sq mi)
- Time zone: UTC+1 (CET)
  - Summer (DST): UTC+2 (CEST)
- Postal code: 363 01
- Website: www.krasnyles.cz

Krásný Les (German: Schönwald) is a municipality and village in Karlovy Vary District in the Karlovy Vary Region of the Czech Republic. It has about 400 inhabitants.

== Administrative division ==
Krásný Les consists of three municipal parts (in brackets population according to the 2021 census):

- Krásný Les (235)
- Damice (63)
- Horní Hrad (20)

== Etymology ==
Both the Czech name Krásný Les and the historical German name Schönwald mean 'beautiful forest'.

== Geography ==
Krásný Les is located about 15 kilometres (9 mi) northeast of Karlovy Vary. It lies in the Ore Mountains. The highest peak in the municipality is the mountain Meluzína at 1,097 m (3,599 ft) above sea level, but the highest point is located on the slopes of Klínovec at 1,154 m (3,786 ft). The Ohře River forms the southern municipal border.

== History ==
The first written mention of Krásný Les is from 1226. In the second half of the 13th century, the royal castle of Hauenštejn was founded, and Krásný Les became a part of the Hauenštejn estate.

Prior to 1945, the village was mostly populated by Germans. As a result of World War II, the German-speaking inhabitants were expelled and replaced with Czechs.

Between 1982 and 1992, Krásný Les was a municipal part of Ostrov.

== Demographics ==
Historical population

Year	Pop.	±%
1869	1,351	—
1880	1,321	−2.2%
1890	1,313	−0.6%
1900	1,410	+7.4%
1910	1,431	+1.5%

Year	Pop.	±%
1921	1,294	−9.6%
1930	1,260	−2.6%
1950	400	−68.3%
1961	298	−25.5%
1970	218	−26.8%

Year	Pop.	±%
1980	168	−22.9%
1991	148	−11.9%
2001	169	+14.2%
2011	294	+74.0%
2021	318	+8.2%

Source: Censuses

== Transport ==
The I/13 road (part of the European route E442) from Karlovy Vary to Liberec runs through the municipality.

== Sights ==
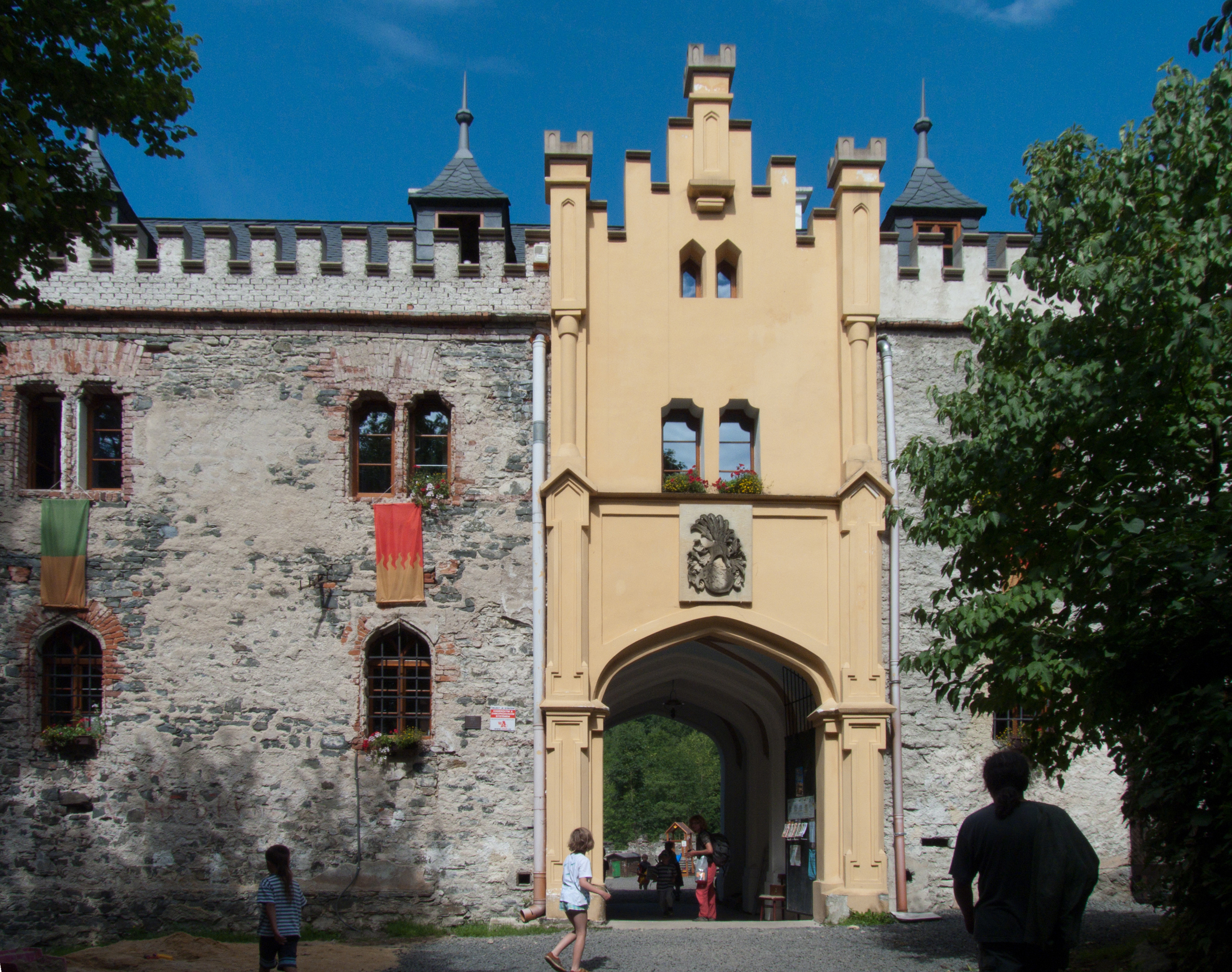
Gate of the Horní Hrad Castle

The most notable monument is the Horní Hrad Castle, also called Hauenštejn. It was probably founded in the second half of the 13th century, but there is also possibility that it was founded around 1320 by its first known owner, the Loket burgrave Mikuláš Winkler. In around 1600, during the rule of the Schlick family, after the castle was damaged by a fire, it was rebuilt in the Renaissance style. In 1878–1882, Ferdinand Bucquoy had the castle rebuilt in the English Gothic Revival style. In the mid-20th century, the castle became a ruin, but was reconstructed at the end of the 20th century, and today it is open to the public. The castle also includes an arboretum and botanical garden.
