= Erdmuthe of Brandenburg =

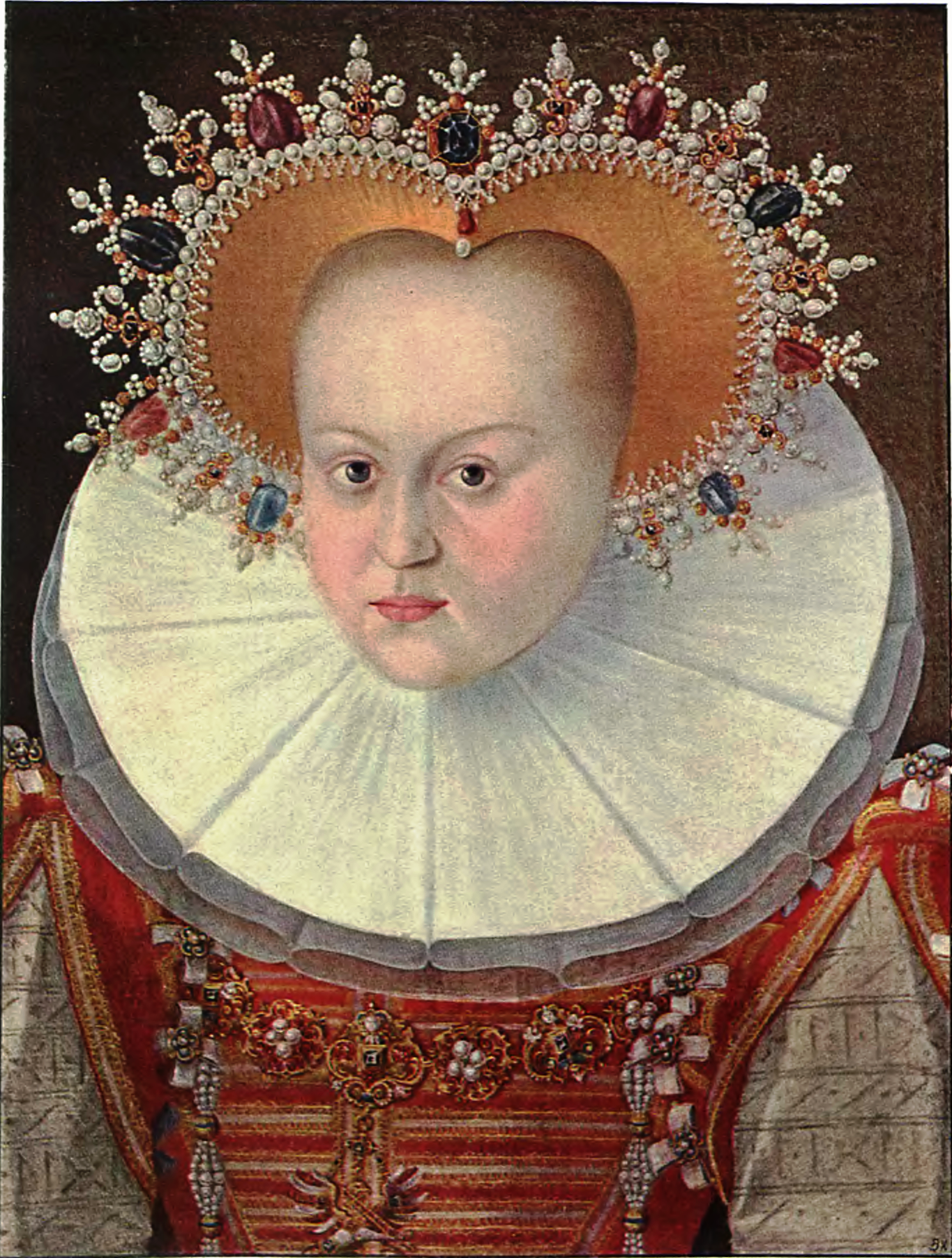
- Erdmuthe of Brandenburg, Duchess of Pomerania-Stettin
- Born: 26 June 1561; Berlin
- Died: 13 November 1623 (aged 62); Stolp
- Spouse: John Frederick, Duke of Pomerania
- House: Hohenzollern
- Father: John George, Elector of Brandenburg
- Mother: Sabina of Brandenburg-Ansbach

Erdmuthe of Brandenburg (26 June 1561 – 13 November 1623) was a Princess of Brandenburg and by marriage Duchess of Pomerania.

== Life ==
Erdmuthe was born in Berlin, the eldest daughter of the Elector of Brandenburg John George (1525–1598) from his second marriage to Sabina (1548–1575), daughter of the Margrave George of Brandenburg-Ansbach-Kulmbach. The princess was her father's favorite child on account of her love for science and Latin literature.

She married on 17 February 1577 in Stettin (Szczecin) John Frederick of Pomerania (1542–1600). At the age of 7 years she was engaged to the 26 years old John Frederick. On this occasion, the old inheritance treaty between the two houses and the entitlements in case one of them would go extinct, were redefined. The marriage was described as a happy one, but it remained childless. After a miscarriage, Elizabeth of Doberschütz gave her a drug to lower the fever. Elizabeth was later accused of having bewitched Erdmuthe and making her barren.

Erdmuthe was instrumental in the initiation of the marriage of her nephew Christian II of Saxony with Hedwig of Denmark and Norway. In 1596, she wrote a prayer book for her sister Sophie (1568–1622), which is one of the oldest prayer books for women.

After her husband died on 9 February 1600, Erdmuthe received the district of Stolp as Wittum and lived in the castle of Stolp. After the death of Schantes of Tessen in 1608, she also spent time on the outwork of Schmolsin castle. She appointed Michael Brüggemann as a chaplain at the Castle Church in Stolp. She died in Stolp.
