= Horní Hrad Castle =

Coordinates: 50.35°N 13.0167°E

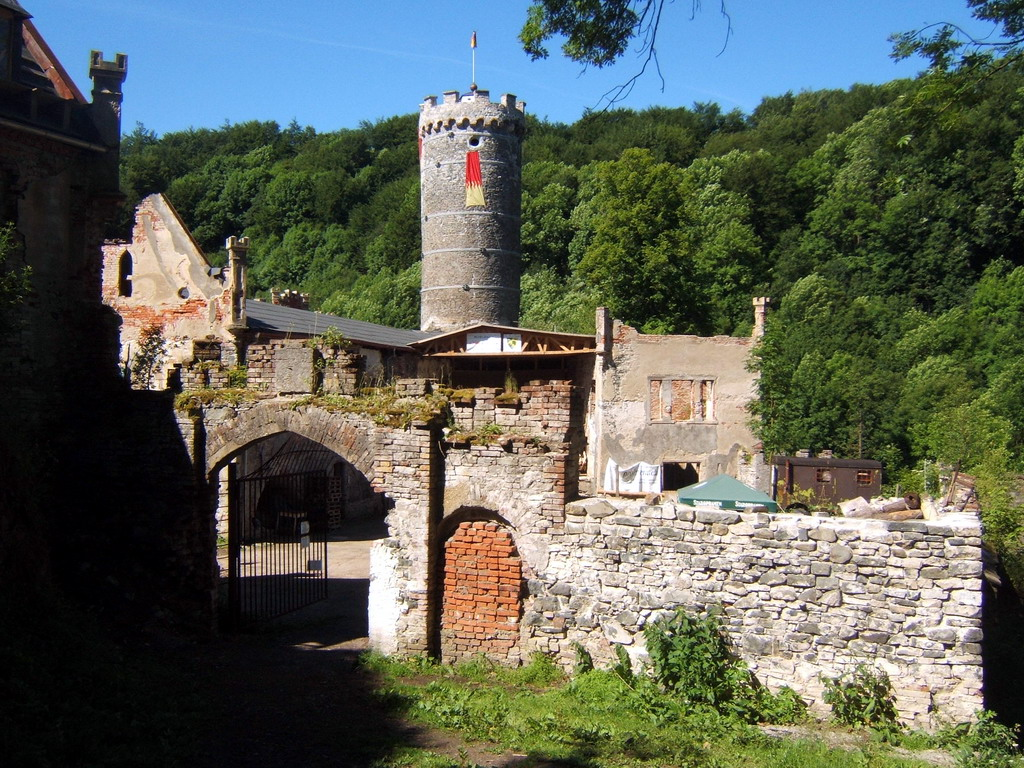
View from the east

Horní Hrad Castle, formerly and alternatively called Hauenštejn Castle (German: Hauenstein), is a medieval castle in the territory of Krásný Les in the Karlovy Vary Region of the Czech Republic. It is situated in the Ore Mountains. Today it is privately owned.

== History ==
The castle was built in the 13th century by King Ottokar II of Bohemia or his son Wenceslaus II to guard royal paths and local mines. The first known owner was Mikuláš Winkler, burgrave of Loket Castle, who sold Horní Hrad Castle to the monastery in Doksany. The monastery exchanged it for another building with King John of Bohemia. His son Charles IV enlarged the castle's estate. The castle frequently changed its keepers in the second half of the 14th century and the 15th century but it more or less remained royal property. The rich Schlick family that started silver mining near Jáchymov won the castle in the 16th century. The Schlicks rebuilt the castle in the Renaissance style after a fire in 1600. In 1663, the Schlicks sold the castle to the Saxe-Lauenburg ducal family and it became part of the Ostrov estate. The castle was in the hands of the Baden family from 1689. When the last male member of the family died in 1771, the property of the Badens in Bohemia was inherited by the royal family of Maria Theresa. The Habsburgs sold it to the Buquoy family in 1837. Countess Gabrielle Buquoy started to rebuild the castle in a Romantic style. Ferdinand Buquoy continued the reconstruction under the influence of historism, taking its examples from England (Windsor, Arundel, Belvoir, Lancaster or Oxford) and Bavaria (Hohenswangau, Lahneck).

=== 20th century ===
In World War II it was used by the Hitler Youth and it was also used for snake experiments – a snake from the genus of Coluber was set in the location to fight the adder and a kind of serum was developed there that Rommel used in Africa. After the war, it was confiscated by the state and the communists made it an accommodation for the uranium miners in Jáchymov, and then for a youth organisation. In 1958, it was condemned as not suitable for living and closed up. From that time onwards, it was constantly being ruined, partly by time, partly by vandals.

== Present ==
In 2000 Pavel Palacký, a descendant of Czech historian František Palacký, bought the castle from the municipality of Krásný Les and started with its sanitation.
