= Crossen an der Elster =

- Municipality
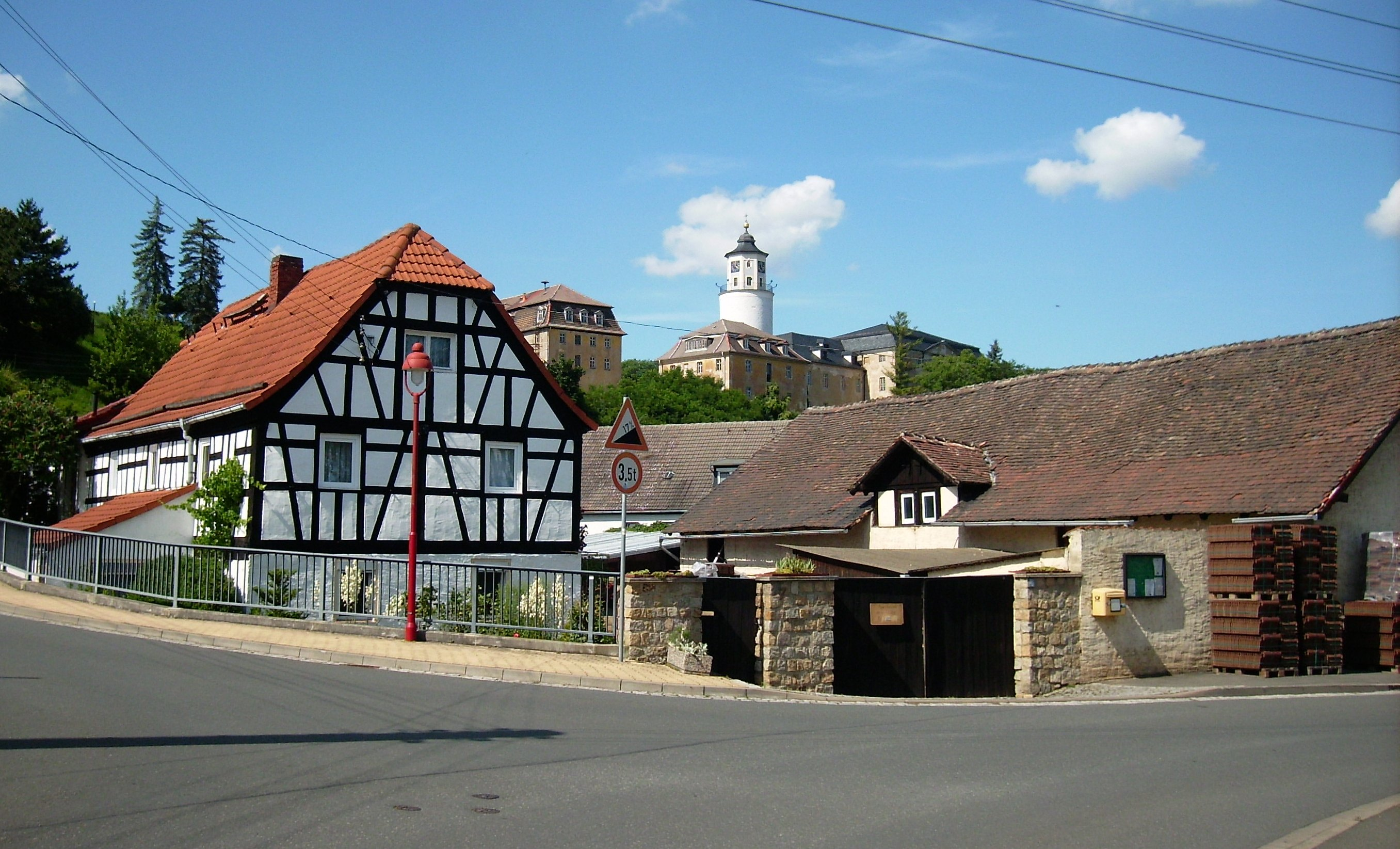
- View of Crossen with the Crossen Palace in background

- Location of Crossen an der Elster within Saale-Holzland-Kreis district
- Interactive map of Crossen an der Elster
- Location within Germany Location within Thuringia
- Coordinates: 50°58′35″N 11°58′40″E
- Country: Germany
- State: Thuringia
- District: Saale-Holzland-Kreis
- Municipal assoc.: Heideland-Elstertal-Schkölen
- Subdivisions: 3

Government
  - Mayor (2023–29): Hebert Zimmermann

Area
  - Total: 10.74 km^{2} (4.15 sq mi)
- Elevation: 176 m (577 ft)

Population (2025-12-31)
  - Total: 1,568
  - Density: 146.0/km^{2} (378.1/sq mi)
- Time zone: UTC+01:00 (CET)
  - Summer (DST): UTC+02:00 (CEST)
- Postal codes: 07613
- Dialling codes: 036693
- Vehicle registration: SHK, EIS, SRO
- Website: www.crossen.de

Crossen an der Elster is a village and municipality in the district Saale-Holzland, in Thuringia, in east-central Germany. The White Elster is the name of the small river which flows through the municipality, so 'Crossen on the Elster' would be the English equivalent.

It is home to the Crossen Palace, a Baroque building with an Italian-style decorated ballroom.

== History ==
The first documented mention of Crossen was from 31 March 995.

In 1937 the name of the town was changed to Krossen/Elster. From 1 January 1991 it was officially renamed to Crossen an der Elster.

== Culture and sights ==
The main attraction is the baroque castle; however it is not open to the public.

In addition, there is the revamped church Michaelis's Church, which was first documented in 1320.

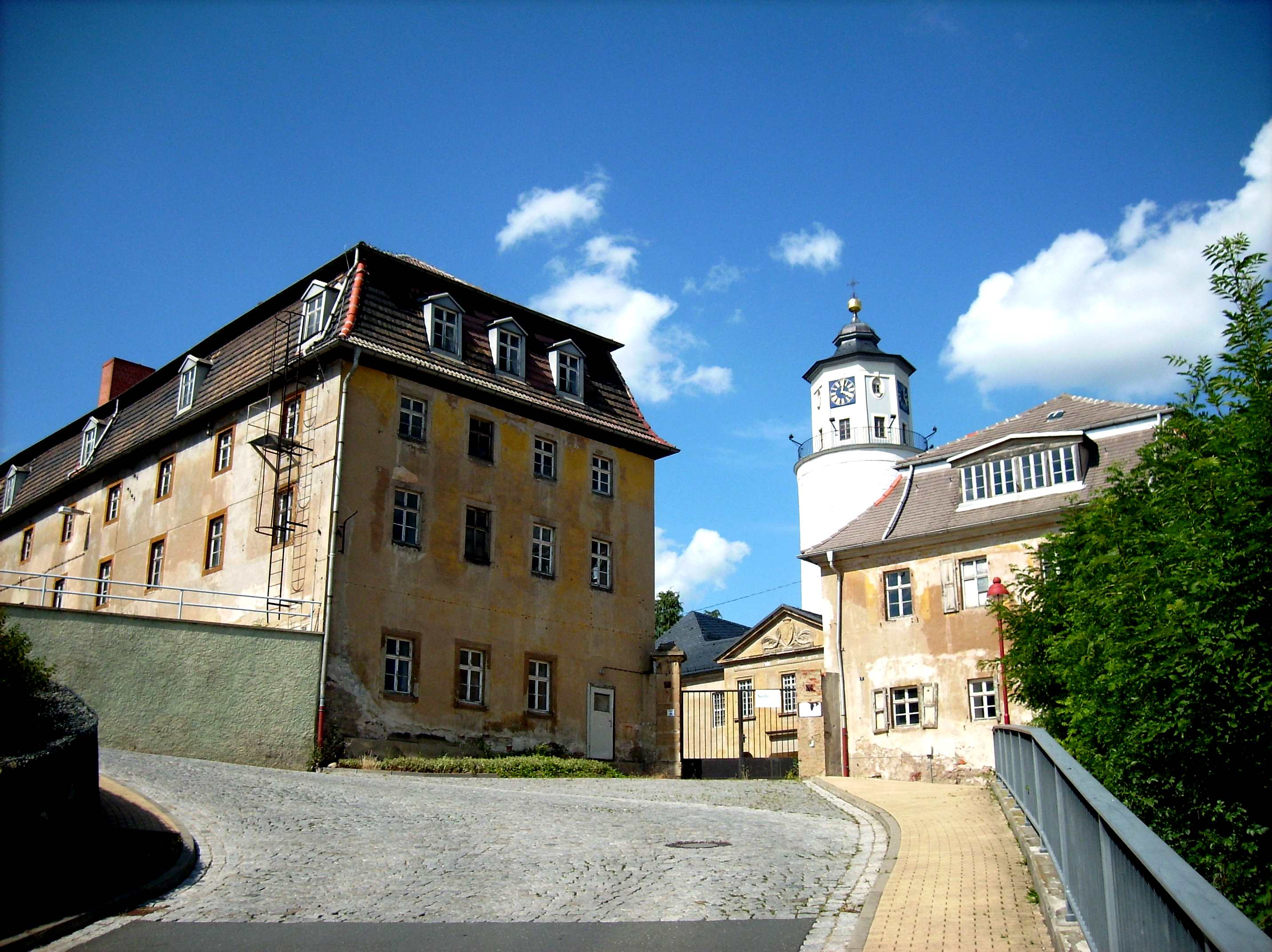
Crossen castle (2008)

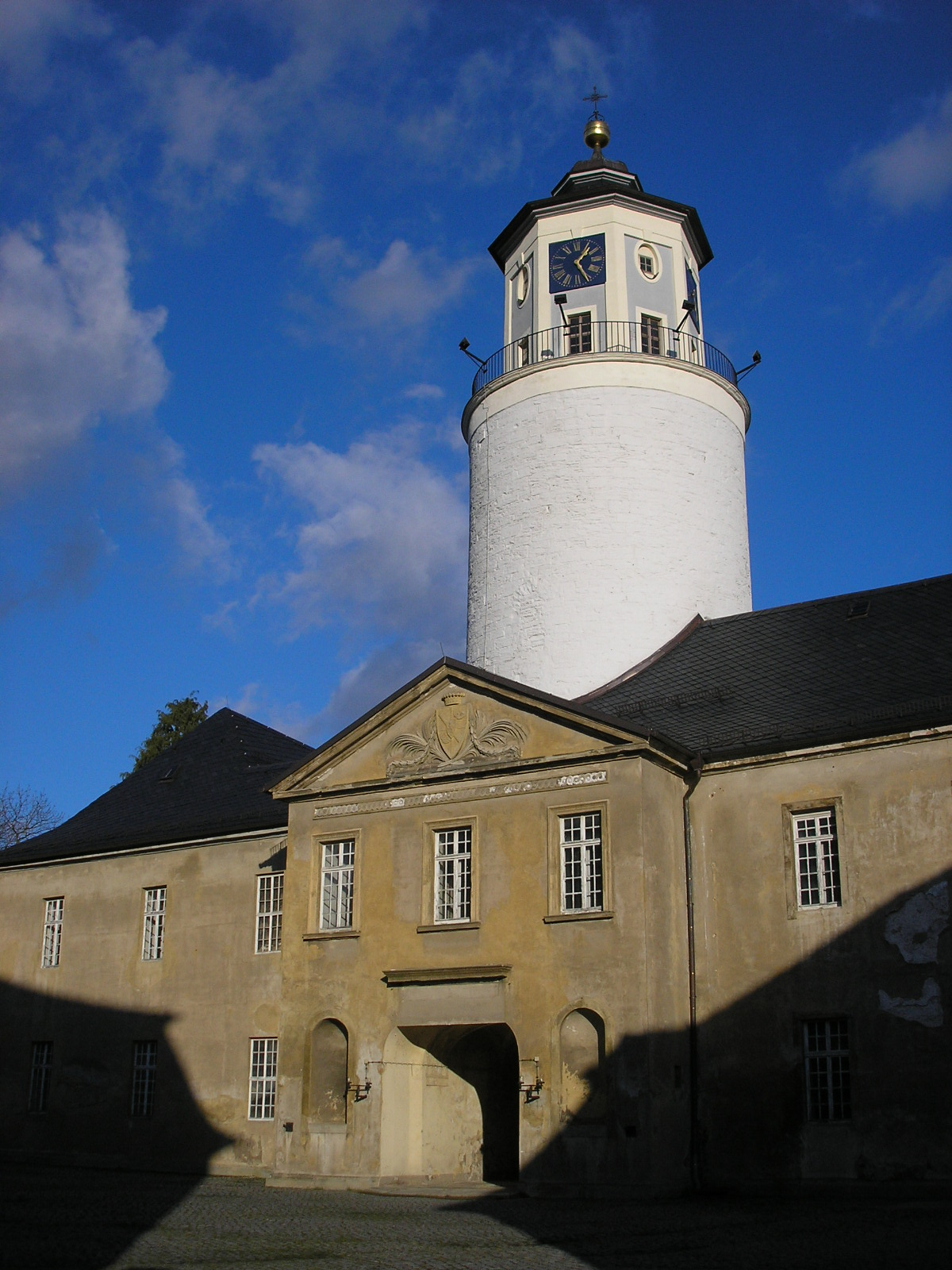
Crossen castle with bergfried

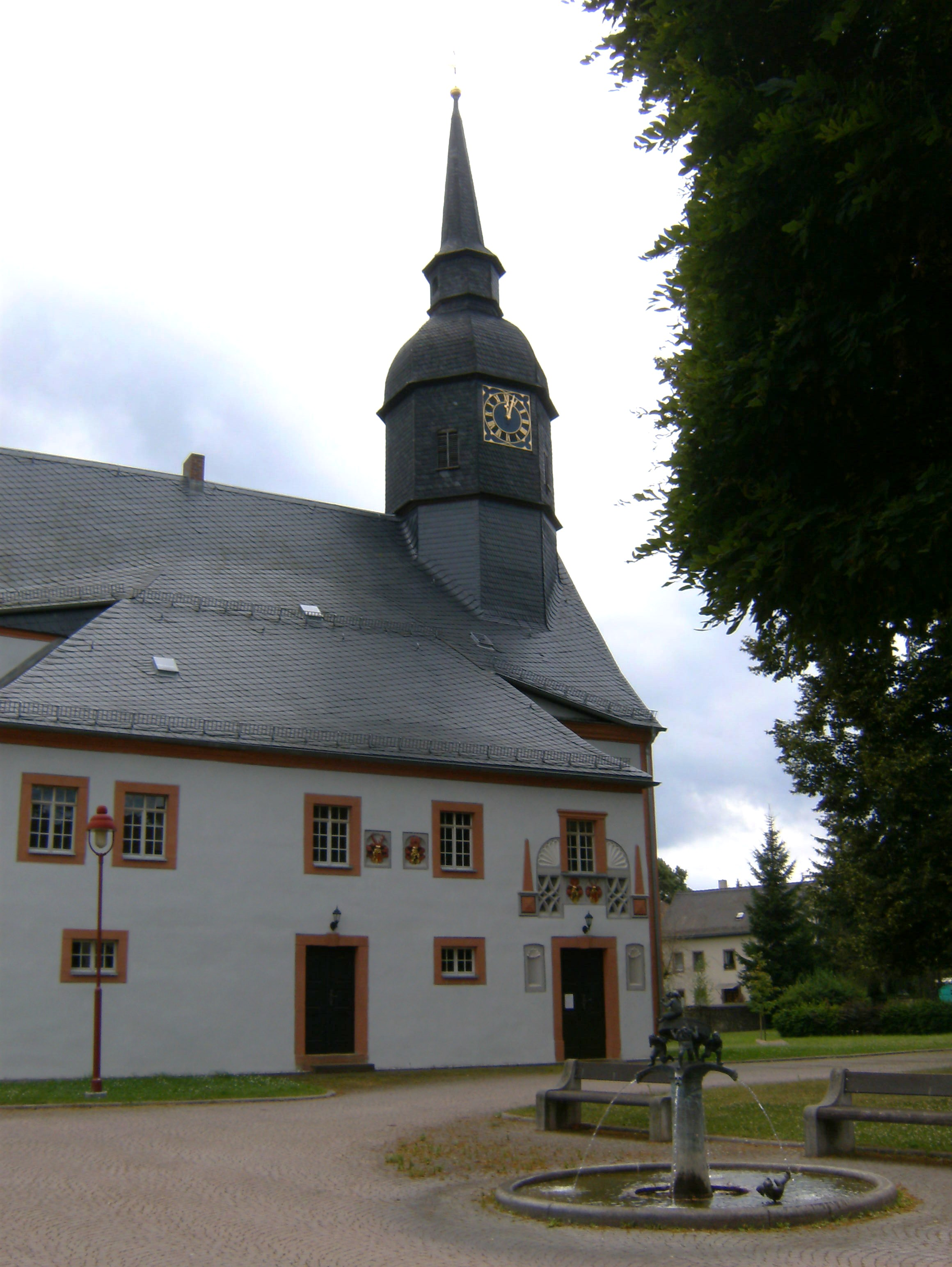
St. Michaelis's Church

=== Monuments ===
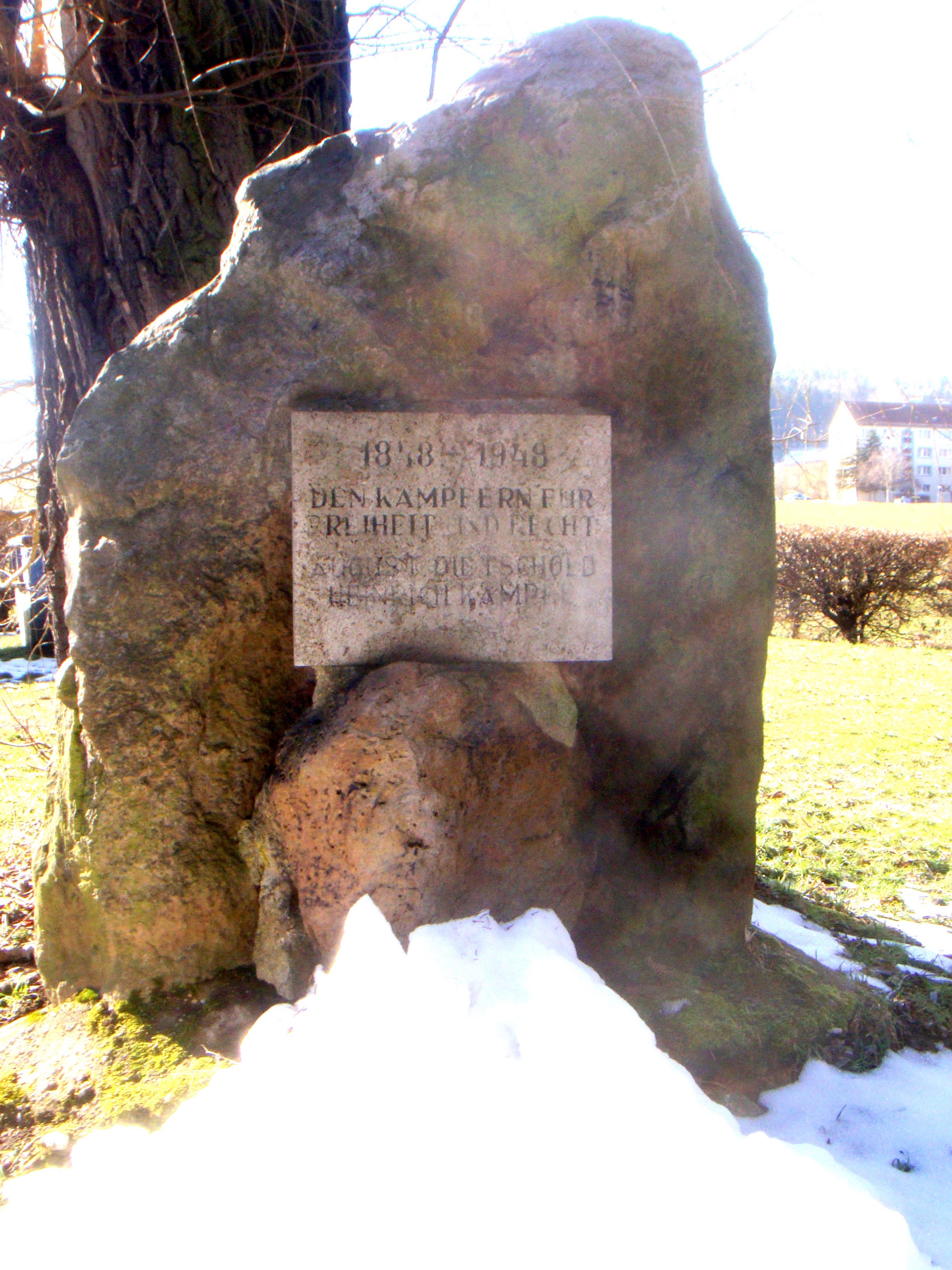
Memorial at the graveyard for the revolutionaries of 1848

There is a monument in the graveyard by an old linden tree in memory of the revolutionaries of 1848. It was erected in the year 1948.

Beside the school there is a memorial for the victims of fascism. It commemorates the resistance fighters of the area, including Communist Party member Willy Graumüller, who was murdered in Bergen-Belsen concentration camp. The Teisker-Siedlung street name is also named for him.

In November 2016 a 'stumbling block' memorial was laid for Willy Graumüller.

=== Historical Population ===
- 1994: 2222
- 1995: 2204
- 1996: 2176
- 1997: 2219
- 1998: 2167
- 1999: 2150
- 2000: 2077
- 2001: 2049
- 2002: 2007
- 2003: 1957
- 2004: 1941
- 2005: 1923
- 2006: 1892
- 2007: 1851
- 2008: 1828
- 2009: 1810
- 2010: 1753
- 2011: 1723
- 2012: 1710
- 2013: 1685
- 2014: 1623
- 2015: 1581
- 2016: 1564
- 2017: 1528
- 2018: 1510
- 2019: 1515
- 2020: 1545
- 2021: 1541

Source: Central Statistics Office of Thuringia

== Mayor ==
The honorary mayor Uwe Berndt (The Left) was elected in June 2014.
