= Frederick IX of Brandenburg =

Margrave of Brandenburg (1588–1611)

Frederick IX
- Margrave of Brandenburg
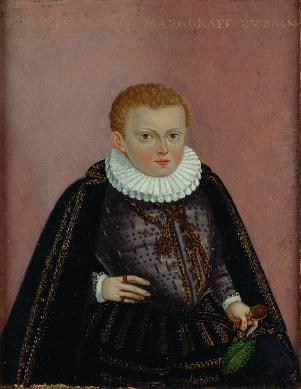
- Margrave Frederick IX of Brandenburg
- Born: 22 March 1588; Cölln
- Died: 19 May 1611 (aged 23); Słońsk
- Burial: Parish church of Küstrin
- House: Hohenzollern
- Father: John George, Elector of Brandenburg
- Mother: Elisabeth of Anhalt-Zerbst

Frederick IX of Brandenburg (22 March 1588 in Cölln – 19 May 1611 in Sonnenburg, Prussia (now Słońsk, Poland)) was a Margrave of Brandenburg.

== Life ==
Frederick, a member of the house of Hohenzollern, was a son of the Elector John George of Brandenburg (1525–1598) from his third marriage to Elisabeth (1563–1607), daughter of Prince Joachim Ernest of Anhalt. Frederick was educated in Frankfurt and Tübingen and undertook an extensive Grand Tour through Europe.

In 1594, he was appointed Coadjutor and then, in 1610, elected Herrenmeister (literally, "Master of the Knights", equivalent to Grand Master) of the Order of Saint John, Bailiwick of Brandenburg, which was seated at Sonnenburg. He died at the age of 23 and was buried in the parish church of Küstrin.

His motto was Justus ut palma floredit (The righteous shall flourish like a palm tree).

== References and sources ==
- F. A. W. Dünnemann: Stammbuch der brandenburgisch-preussischen Regenten, Nauck, 1831, p. 105 (Digitized)
- Samuel Buchholtz: Versuch einer Geschichte der Churmarck Brandenburg von der ersten Erscheinung der deutschen Sennonen an bis auf jezige Zeiten, vol 3–4, F. W. Birnstiel, 1767, p. 490

Frederick IX of Brandenburg House of Hohenzollern Born: 22 March 1588 Died: 19 May 1611
Preceded by Martin, Graf von Hohenstein	Herrenmeister (Grand Master) of the Order of Saint John; 1610-1611	Succeeded by Ernst, Markgraf zu Brandenburg
