= Crossen Palace =

Palace in Crossen an der Elster, Thuringia, Germany

Coordinates: 50°58′41″N 11°58′31″E

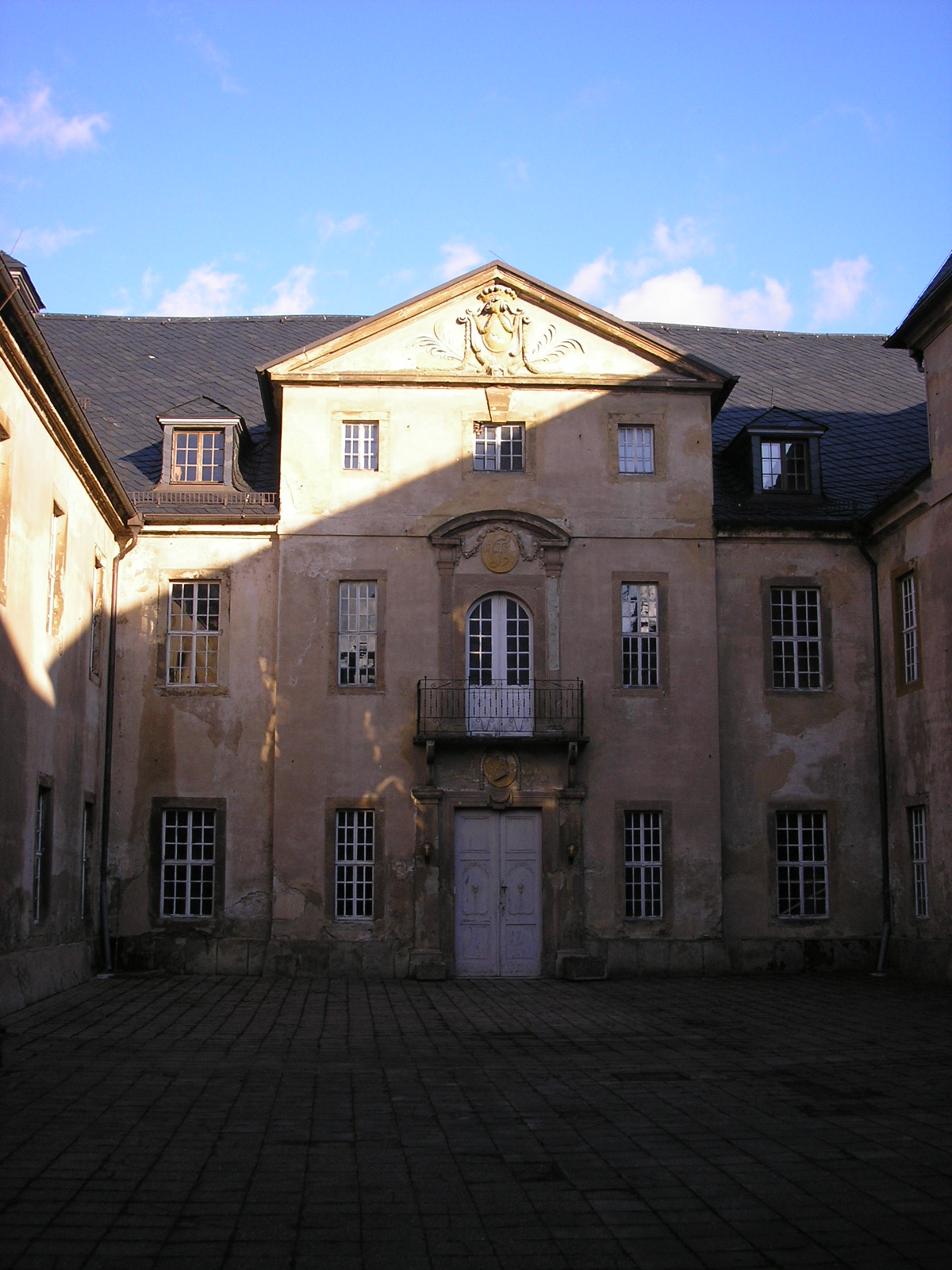
A part of Crossen Palace

Crossen Palace is a Baroque palace in the municipality of Crossen an der Elster in the east of the German federal state of Thuringia, located between Gera in the south and Zeitz in the north. It is situated on the hillside of White Elster valley.

The palace houses a ballroom with Italian Trompe-l'œil decorations in Baroque style. Currently, the palace is vacant and not open for public. Since 2007, it is owned by two investors from Ireland. Previously, it was owned by the State of Thuringia.
