= John George, Elector of Brandenburg =

Elector of Brandenburg from 1571 to 1598

John George
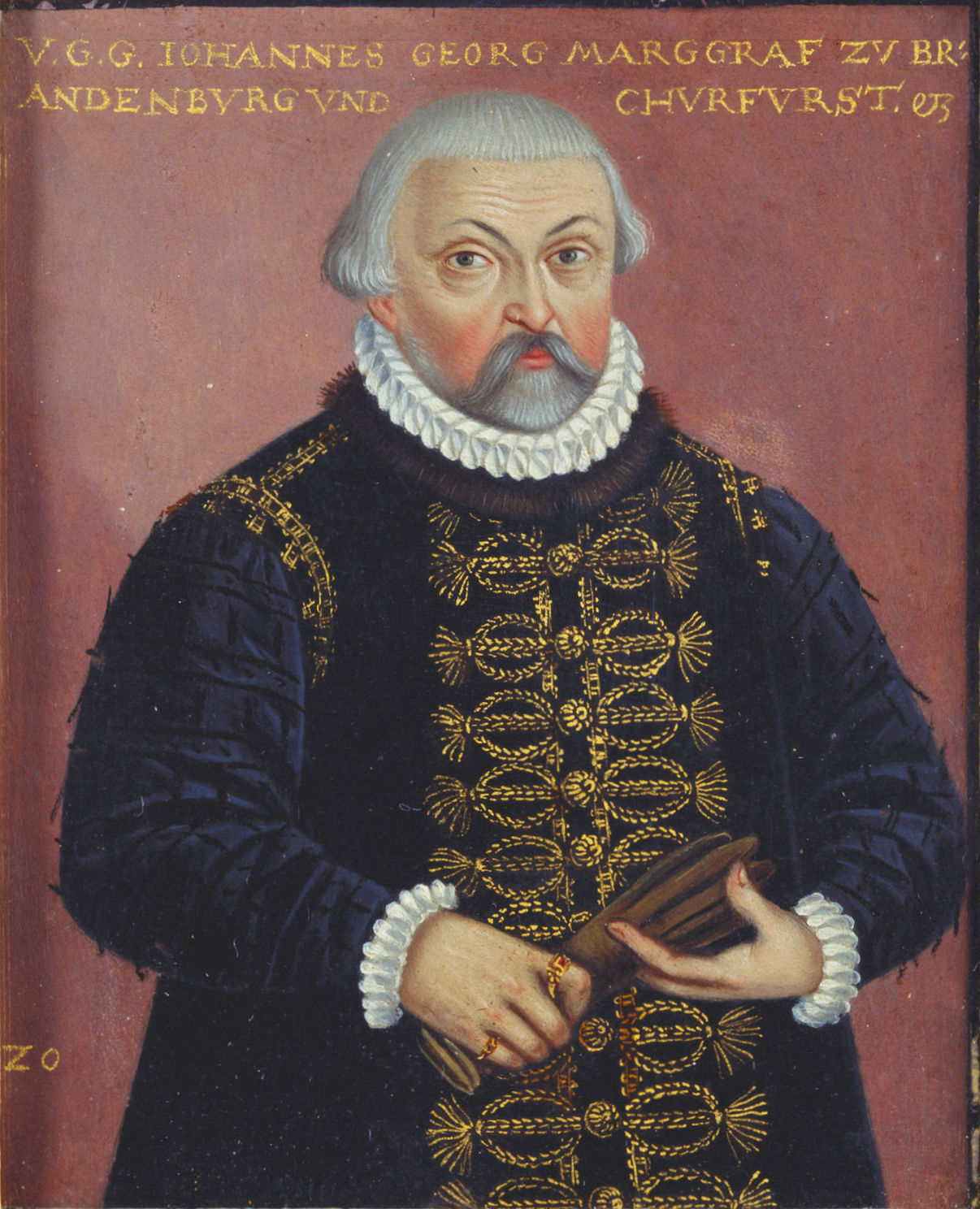

Elector of Brandenburg
- Reign: 3 January 1571 – 8 January 1598
- Predecessor: Joachim II Hector
- Successor: Joachim Frederick
- Born: 11 September 1525; Cölln, Margraviate of Brandenburg, Holy Roman Empire
- Died: 8 January 1598 (aged 72); Cölln, Margraviate of Brandenburg, Holy Roman Empire
- Burial: Berlin Cathedral
- Spouses: Sophie of Legnica (m. 1545; died 1546) Sabina of Brandenburg-Ansbach (m. 1548; died 1575) Elisabeth of Anhalt-Zerbst (m. 1577)
- Issue among others…: See: Joachim Frederick, Elector of Brandenburg; Erdmuthe, Duchess of Pomerania; Anna Maria, Duchess of Pomerania; Sophie, Electress of Saxony; Christian, Margrave of Brandenburg-Bayreuth; Magdalena, Landgravine of Hesse-Darmstadt; Joachim Ernst, Margrave of Brandenburg-Ansbach; Agnes, Duchess of Pomerania and Saxe-Lauenburg; Frederick IX, Margrave of Brandenburg; Elisabeth Sophia, Duchess of Saxe-Lauenburg; George Albert II, Margrave of Brandenburg
- House: Hohenzollern
- Father: Joachim II Hector, Elector of Brandenburg
- Mother: Magdalena of Saxony

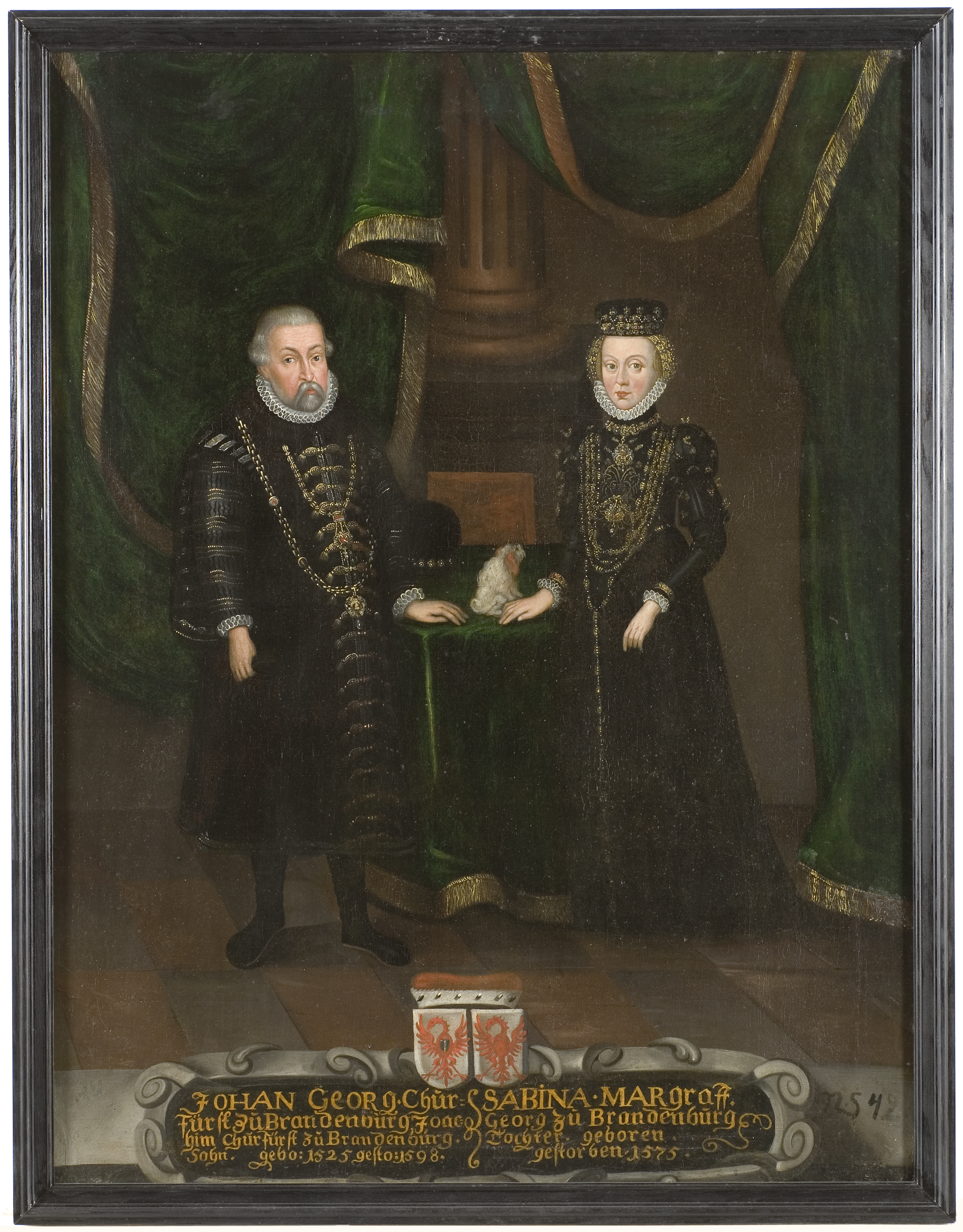
John George and his second consort, Sabine of Ansbach

John George of Brandenburg (German: Johann Georg von Brandenburg; 11 September 1525 – 8 January 1598) was a prince-elector of the Margraviate of Brandenburg (1571–1598).

== Early life ==
Born as a member of the House of Hohenzollern, John George was the eldest son of Joachim II Hector, Elector of Brandenburg, and Princess Magdalena of Saxony.

== Biography ==
Faced with large debts of 2.5 million guilder accumulated during the reign of his father, John George instituted a grain tax which drove part of the peasantry into dependence on a nobility that was exempt from taxation. He had Jews expelled from Brandenburg in 1573, stripped of their assets and prohibited from returning. Though a staunch Lutheran opposed to the rise of Calvinism, he permitted the admission of Calvinist refugees from the wars in the Spanish Netherlands and France. On 13 July 1574, he founded the Berlinisches Gymnasium zum Grauen Kloster, the first humanistic educational institution in Berlin. He was succeeded by his son Joachim Frederick.

Upon the death of his kinsman Albert I, Duke of Prussia, in 1568, the Duchy of Prussia was inherited by the latter's underage son Albert Frederick. John George's father was a co-inheritor of the Duchy of Prussia. In 1577 the Brandenburg electors became co-regent with Duke Albert Frederick of Prussia.

== Family and children ==
John George was married three times.

His first wife was Princess Sophie of Legnica (ca. 1525 – 6 February 1546), the daughter of Frederick II of Legnica, whom he married in 1545. They had one child together:

1. Joachim Frederick (27 January 1546 – 18 July 1608)

Secondly, he married Margravine Sabina of Brandenburg-Ansbach (12 May 1529 – 2 November 1575), daughter of George, Margrave of Brandenburg-Ansbach, in 1548. They had the following children:

1. George Albert (19 February 1555 – 8 January 1557) died in early childhood.
2. John (1 March 1557), died at birth, twin with Albert.
3. Albert (1 March 1557), died at birth, twin with John.
4. Magdalena Sabina (9 September 1559) died at birth.
5. Erdmuthe (26 June 1561 – 13 November 1623), married in 1577 to Duke John Frederick of Pomerania
6. Marie (13 September 1562) died at birth.
7. Hedwig (19 August 1563) died at birth.
8. Magdalena (31 July 1564) died at birth.
9. Margaret (19 September 1565) died at birth.
10. Anna Maria (3 February 1567 – 4 November 1618), married in 1581 to Duke Barnim X of Pomerania
11. Sophie (6 June 1568 – 7 December 1622), married in 1582 to Elector Christian I of Saxony

Thirdly, he married Princess Elisabeth of Anhalt-Zerbst (15 September [O.S. 5 September] 1563 – 5 October 1607), the daughter of Joachim Ernest, Prince of Anhalt in 1577. They had the following children:

1. Christian (30 January 1581 – 30 May 1655)
2. Magdalena (7 January 1582 – 4 May 1616), married in 1598 to Landgrave Louis V of Hesse-Darmstadt
3. Joachim Ernest (22 June 1583 – 7 March 1625)
4. Agnes (17 July 1584 – 26 March 1629), married:
  1. in 1604 Duke Philipp Julius of Pomerania;
  2. in 1628 Duke Francis Charles of Saxe-Lauenburg
5. Frederick (22 March 1588 – 19 May 1611)
6. Elisabeth Sophia (13 July 1589 – 24 December 1629), married:
  1. in 1613 to Reichsfürst (Prince) Janusz Radziwiłł;
  2. on 27 February 1628 to Duke Julius Henry of Saxe-Lauenburg
7. Dorothea Sibylle (19 October 1590 – 9 March 1625), married in 1610 to Duke John Christian of Brieg
8. George Albert (20 November 1591 – 29 November 1615)
9. Sigismund (20 November 1592 – 30 April 1640) died aged 47 unmarried with no issue.
10. John (13 July 1597 – 23 September 1627), Bishop of Havelberg, died unmarried with no issue.
11. John George (4 August 1598 – 27 January 1637), died unmarried with no issue.

== Ancestors ==
John George's ancestors in three generations
John George, Elector of Brandenburg	Father: Joachim II Hector, Elector of Brandenburg	Paternal Grandfather: Joachim I Nestor, Elector of Brandenburg	Paternal Great-grandfather: John Cicero, Elector of Brandenburg
John George, Elector of Brandenburg	Father: Joachim II Hector, Elector of Brandenburg	Paternal Grandfather: Joachim I Nestor, Elector of Brandenburg	Paternal Great-grandmother: Margaret of Thuringia
John George, Elector of Brandenburg	Father: Joachim II Hector, Elector of Brandenburg	Paternal Grandmother: Elisabeth of Denmark	Paternal Great-grandfather: John of Denmark
John George, Elector of Brandenburg	Father: Joachim II Hector, Elector of Brandenburg	Paternal Grandmother: Elisabeth of Denmark	Paternal Great-grandmother: Christina of Saxony
John George, Elector of Brandenburg	Mother: Magdalena of Saxony	Maternal Grandfather: George, Duke of Saxony	Maternal Great-grandfather: Albert, Duke of Saxony
John George, Elector of Brandenburg	Mother: Magdalena of Saxony	Maternal Grandfather: George, Duke of Saxony	Maternal Great-grandmother: Sidonie of Poděbrady
John George, Elector of Brandenburg	Mother: Magdalena of Saxony	Maternal Grandmother: Barbara Jagiellon	Maternal Great-grandfather: Casimir IV Jagiellon
John George, Elector of Brandenburg	Mother: Magdalena of Saxony	Maternal Grandmother: Barbara Jagiellon	Maternal Great-grandmother: Elisabeth of Austria

John George, Elector of Brandenburg House of Hohenzollern Born: 22 September 1525 Died: 8 January 1598[aged 72]
Regnal titles
Preceded by Joachim II Hector	Elector of Brandenburg; 1571–1598	Succeeded by Joachim Frederick
