= Prince Rudolf of Liechtenstein =

Austrian aristocrat

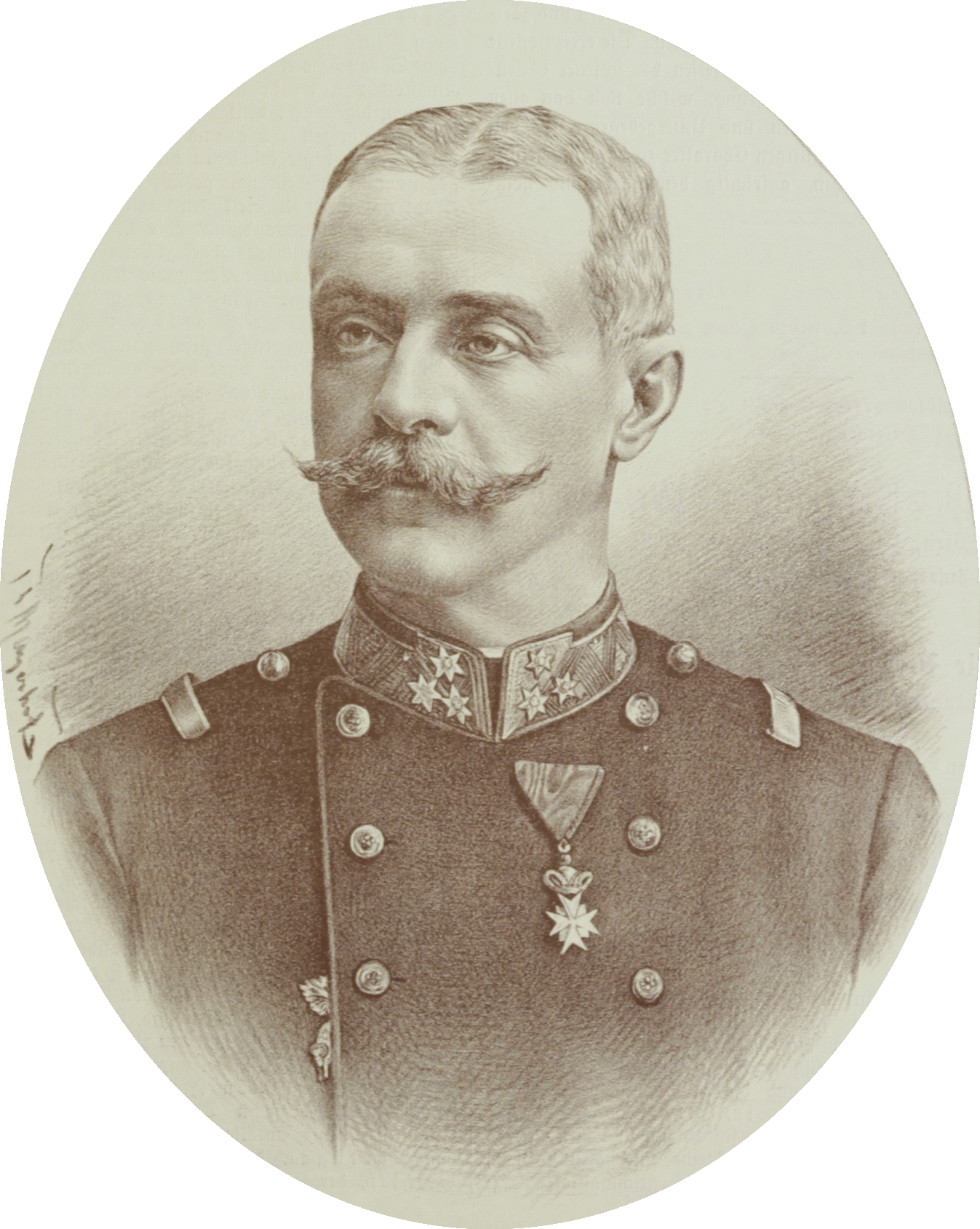
- Rudolf as a Field Marshal Lieutenant, c. 1895
- Born: 18 April 1838; Vienna, Austrian Empire
- Died: 15 December 1908 (aged 70); Moravský Krumlov, Austro-Hungarian Empire
Names
- Rudolf Eugen Cresantius Ferdinand Karl
- House: Liechtenstein
- Father: Prince Karl Joseph of Liechtenstein
- Mother: Countess Franziska von Wrbna-Freudenthal

Prince Rudolf of Liechtenstein (18 April 1838 – 15 December 1908) was an Austrian aristocrat, a general in the Common Army and one of the highest officials in the court of Emperor Franz Joseph I.

== Biography ==
Rudolf was the youngest child and second son of Prince Karl Joseph of Liechtenstein and Countess Franziska von Wrbna-Freudenthal. His family was a cadet branch of the reigning Princely House of Liechtenstein, the Moravský-Krumlov line, which was descended from Prince Karl Borromäus, the younger brother of Franz Joseph I, Prince of Liechtenstein. Upon the death of his older brother Karl Rudolf – who was unmarried and childless – in 1899, Rudolf became head of the family.

After completing his education, Rudolf joined the military, eventually becoming General of the Cavalry in 1904. In 1862 he entered the service of the imperial court in Vienna, first as treasurer and later, privy councilor and Acting Minister of the Horse, as well as an honorary colonel of the Imperial Life-guards. In 1896 he was personally appointed by the Emperor as First Obersthofmeister (Lord High Steward), the premier official of the court, after the death of Prince Konstantin of Hohenlohe-Schillingsfürst. Rudolf's tenure at court was fraught with multiple events: the Badeni riots in Bohemia in 1897, the assassination of the Empress Elisabeth in 1898, and the morganatic marriage of Archduke Franz Ferdinand to Countess Sophie Chotek in 1900. He was also present during the state visits of King Edward VII of the United Kingdom, Kaiser Wilhelm II of Germany and Tsar Nicholas II of Russia in 1903.

An accomplished musician, Rudolf composed music for the texts of Walther von der Vogelweide and Heinrich Heine.

In the later years of his life, Rudolf was often plagued by illness; his duties were taken over by his deputy Alfred, 2nd Prince of Montenuovo. He eventually died unmarried in 1908, and was interred in the family crypt in Moravský Krumlov castle, Moravia. With his death, the Moravský-Krumlov line of the House of Liechtenstein became extinct.

== Honours ==
National orders and decorations

- Knight of the Golden Fleece, 1892
- Grand Cross of the Royal Hungarian Order of St. Stephen, 1896
- Golden Jubilee Court Medal, 1898
- Golden Jubilee Medal for the Armed Forces, 1898
- Service Award for Officers, 3rd Class

Foreign orders and decorations

- Kingdom of Bavaria:
  - Grand Cross of Merit of the Bavarian Crown, 1896
  - Knight of St. Hubert, 1898
- Belgium: Grand Cordon of the Order of Leopold (military)
- Principality of Bulgaria: Grand Cross of St. Alexander, in Brilliants
- (Saxe-Coburg and Gotha) (Duchy of Saxe-Altenburg) (Saxe-Meiningen) Ernestine duchies: Grand Cross of the Saxe-Ernestine House Order
- France: Grand Officer of the Legion of Honour
- Grand Duchy of Hesse: Grand Cross of the Ludwig Order, 18 May 1893
- Kingdom of Italy: Grand Cross of Saints Maurice and Lazarus
- Empire of Japan: Grand Cordon of the Rising Sun
- Sovereign Military Order of Malta: Bailiff Grand Cross of Honour and Devotion
- Mecklenburg: Grand Cross of the Wendish Crown, with Golden Crown
- Ottoman Empire: Order of Osmanieh, 1st Class
- Persian Empire: Order of the August Portrait, in Brilliants
- Kingdom of Portugal: Grand Cross of the Tower and Sword
- Kingdom of Prussia:
  - Knight of the Royal Crown Order, 2nd Class, 24 August 1864
  - Grand Cross of the Red Eagle, 25 April 1896
  - Knight of the Black Eagle, in Brilliants
- Qing dynasty: Order of the Double Dragon, Class III Grade I
- Kingdom of Romania: Grand Cross of the Star of Romania
- Russian Empire:
  - Knight of St. Andrew, 1900
  - Knight of St. Alexander Nevsky
  - Knight of the White Eagle
  - Knight of St. Anna, 1st Class
  - Knight of St. Stanislaus, 1st Class
- Saxe-Weimar-Eisenach: Grand Cross of the White Falcon, 1892
- Kingdom of Saxony:
  - Grand Cross of the Albert Order, 1891
  - Knight of the Rue Crown, 1898
- Schaumburg-Lippe: Cross of Honour of the House Order of Lippe, 1st Class
- Kingdom of Serbia: Grand Cross of the White Eagle
- Siam: Grand Cross of the White Elephant
- Spain: Grand Cross of the Order of Charles III, with Collar, 19 October 1906
- Sweden-Norway: Knight of the Seraphim, 25 February 1904
- (Tuscany) Tuscan Grand Ducal Family: Grand Cross of St. Joseph
- United Kingdom: Honorary Grand Cross of the Royal Victorian Order, 9 October 1903
- Württemberg:
  - Commander of the Friedrich Order, 2nd Class, 1866
  - Grand Cross of the Württemberg Crown, 1893

== Ancestry ==
Ancestors of Prince Rudolf of Liechtenstein

8. Prince Karl Borromäus of Liechtenstein
4. Prince Karl of Liechtenstein
9. Princess Maria Eleonore of Oettingen-Spielberg
2. Prince Karl Joseph of Liechtenstein
10. Johann Joseph I, Prince of Khevenhüller-Metsch
5. Countess Marianne Josepha von Khevenhüller-Metsch
11. Countess Karolina Maria von Metsch
1. Prince Rudolf of Liechtenstein
12. Count Eugen Wenzel Wrbna-Freudenthal
6. Count Rudolf von Wrbna-Freudenthal
13. Countess Maria Theresia von Kollonitz
3. Countess Franziska von Wrbna-Freudenthal
14. Dominik Andreas II, Prince of Kaunitz-Rietberg-Questenberg
7. Countess Maria Theresia Kaunitz-Rietberg-Questenberg
15. Countess Bernhardine von Plettenberg-Wittem

== Sources ==
- Dotson, Samuel C. (2003). Genealogie des Fürstlichen Hauses Liechtenstein seit Hartmann II. (1544-1585) (in German). Rosvall Royal Books. ISBN 9789197397841.
