= Karolina of Legnica-Brieg =

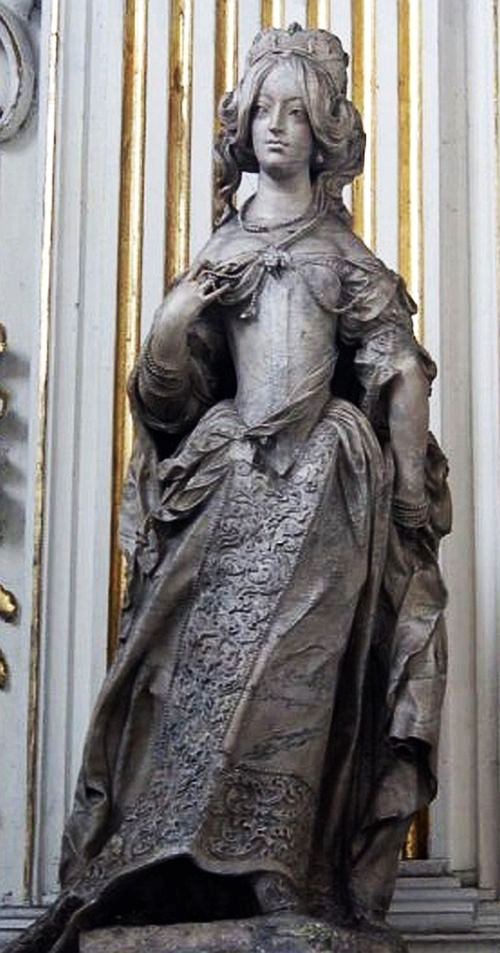
Alabaster statue of Duchess Karolina: The Piasts Mausoleum in St. John the Baptist Church, Legnica

Karolina of Legnica-Brieg-Wohlau (German: Charlotte von Liegnitz-Brieg-Wohlau, Polish: Karolina Piastówna; 2 December 1652 in Brzeg – 24 December 1707 in Wrocław), was a Silesian noble, duchess of Legnica, Brzeg and Wołów and the last member of the Silesian Piasts dynasty. She was the eldest daughter of Christian, Duke of Brieg and Louise of Anhalt-Dessau (daughter of John Casimir, Prince of Anhalt-Dessau). After the death of her father, she married secretly without the knowledge of her mother on 14 July 1672 to Frederick, Duke of Schleswig-Holstein-Sonderburg-Wiesenburg (b. 1651 – d. 1724) and also became the duchess of Schleswig-Holstein-Sonderburg-Wiesenburg.

== Life ==
=== Youth ===
Karolina was born in Brzeg as the first child of her parents. They gave her an unusual first name, which had never been given to another member of the Piast dynasty (and never was after her death). She was baptized on 1 January 1653. Her godfather was a senior member of the family, Duke George Rudolf of Liegnitz, but he was seriously ill at the time of her birth. He died thirteen days later on 14 January, so he was replaced during the ceremony by her paternal uncle, Louis IV of Legnica.

During her early years, Karolina, as an only child, witnessed the rule of her father. In 1653 after the death of Duke George Rudolf, her uncles George III and Louis IV, and her father Christian, together inherited Legnica and Brzeg, for one year as co-rulers, until they decided to divide their domains in 1654. In the division, Christian received the poorest parts of the Duchy, Wołów and Oława. However, in 1664, after the death of his only surviving brother, George III, Karolina's father united the whole Duchy of Legnica-Brzeg under his rule.

Christian and his wife raised their daughter as a Calvinist. On 29 September 1660, Duchess Louise gave birth to a son and heir, George William. Of the four children born to Karolina's parents, only she and George William survived infancy.

=== Marriage ===
Duke Christian died on 28 February 1672 and was succeeded by his only surviving son, George William, who was placed under the regency of his mother. A few months later, Karolina married Frederick, Duke of Schleswig-Holstein-Sonderburg-Wiesenburg. He was a great-great-grandson of King Christian III under the paternal line. The groom was from a Catholic family and served in the Imperial army as a Colonel Cuirassier. Karolina probably met him through a Jesuit close to her mother. Motivated by love rather than for dynastic reasons, she adopted the Catholic faith. On 14 July 1672 Karolina and Frederick married secretly and almost one year later, on 3 May 1673, the official wedding took place. On 12 January 1674 their only child, Leopold, was born. However, the marriage proved unsuccessful and with the consent of Emperor Leopold I in August 1680 they became formally separated. In accordance with the legal arrangement of the separation, their son remained under the custody of the father.

=== George William's death and last years ===
On 21 November 1675, Karolina's brother George William, the last Piast ruler of Legnica-Brzeg, died underage and without male heirs. The Princess explored the possibility of succeeding him in his domains. However, the Emperor Leopold I, despite the fact that he was a Catholic, objected to her plans. Only by an Imperial decree, dated 14 September 1680, did she receive an annual salary of 6,000 talers during her lifetime (later, the sum was reduced to 4,000 talers). Karolina settled her residence in Wrocław, the old city of her ancestors. She lived there alone, leading a devout life and giving to charitable activities.

=== Death ===
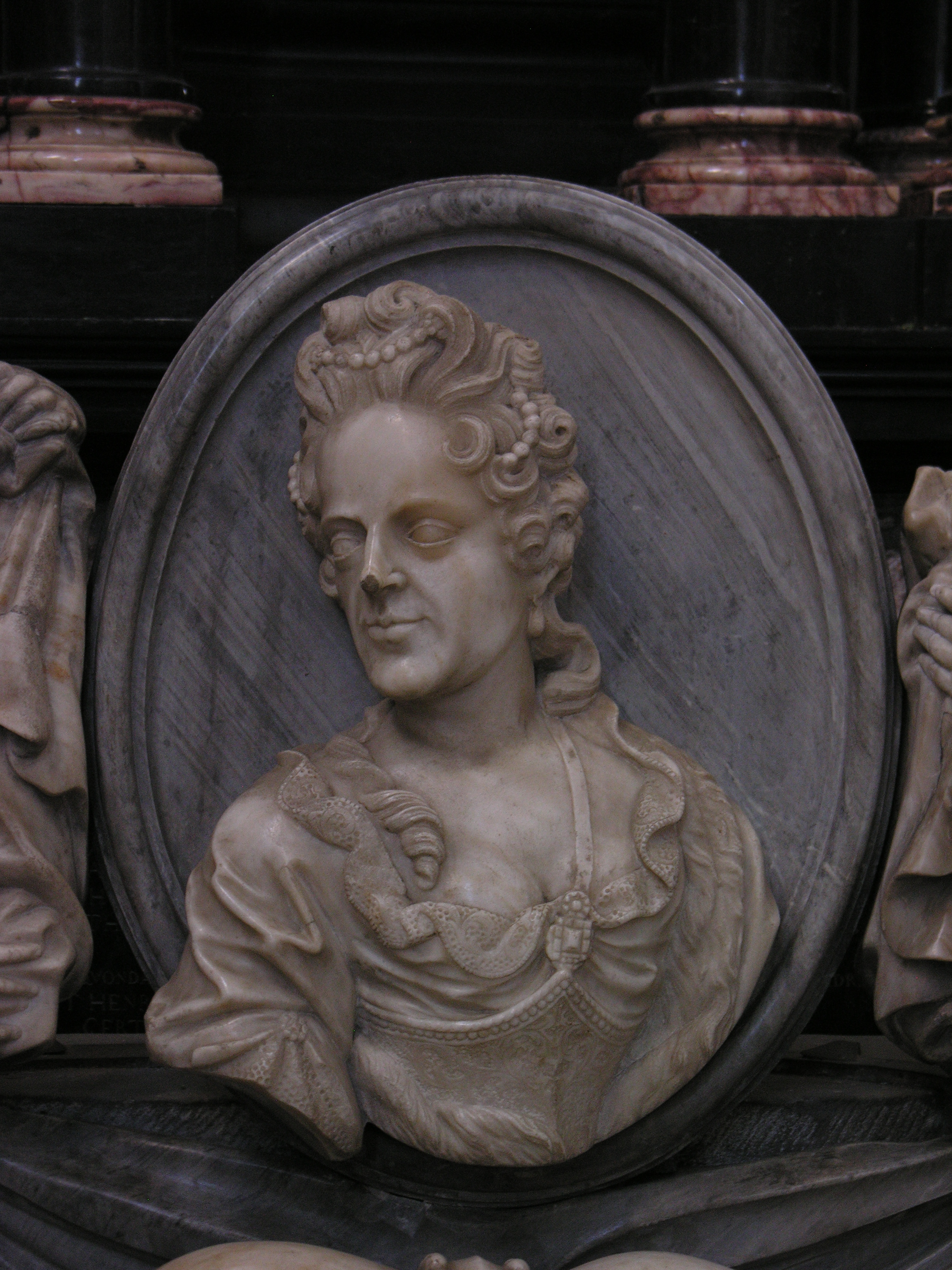
Tombstone of Karolina in Trzebnica Abbey

Karolina died on 24 December 1707 in Wrocław. Her heart was placed in a silver urn in the local church of St. Klara (in the chapel of St. Hedwig), and her body was buried in the monastery of Trzebnica. This happened against her mother's wishes, who before her own death in 1680 had prepared her place in the mausoleum of the Dukes of Legnica, called Piasteum. In the place which was supposedly to contain Karolina's remains, only an empty place was left.

=== Legacy ===
Leopold of Schleswig-Holstein-Sonderburg-Wiesenburg, Karolina's only child, succeeded his father as duke when he died in 1724. He had five daughters from his marriage with Marie Elisabeth, daughter of Hans-Adam I, Prince of Liechtenstein:

1. Theresia (1713–1745), who married Johann Aloys I, Prince of Oettingen-Oettingen-Spielberg (1707–1780):
  1. Marie Leopoldine (1741–1795), who married Ernst Christoph, Prince of Kaunitz (1737–1797). Her only child, Countess Eleonore of Kaunitz-Rietberg, was the first wife of Klemens Wenzel, Prince von Metternich.
  2. Marie Charlotte (b. and d. 1743)
  3. Maria Eleonore (1745–1812), who married Prince Karl Borromäus of Liechtenstein.
2. Eleonora, who married Giuseppe Gonzaga, the last Duke of Guastalla.
3. Gabriela, who married Karl Frederick of Fürstenberg-Möskirch.
4. Charlotte, who married Charles Thomas, Prince of Löwenstein-Wertheim-Rochefort. Her only daughter, Leopoldine, married Charles Albert II, Prince of Hohenlohe-Waldenburg-Schillingsfürst.
5. Antonia, who died aged fourteen.
