= Leopold, Duke of Schleswig-Holstein-Sonderburg-Wiesenburg =

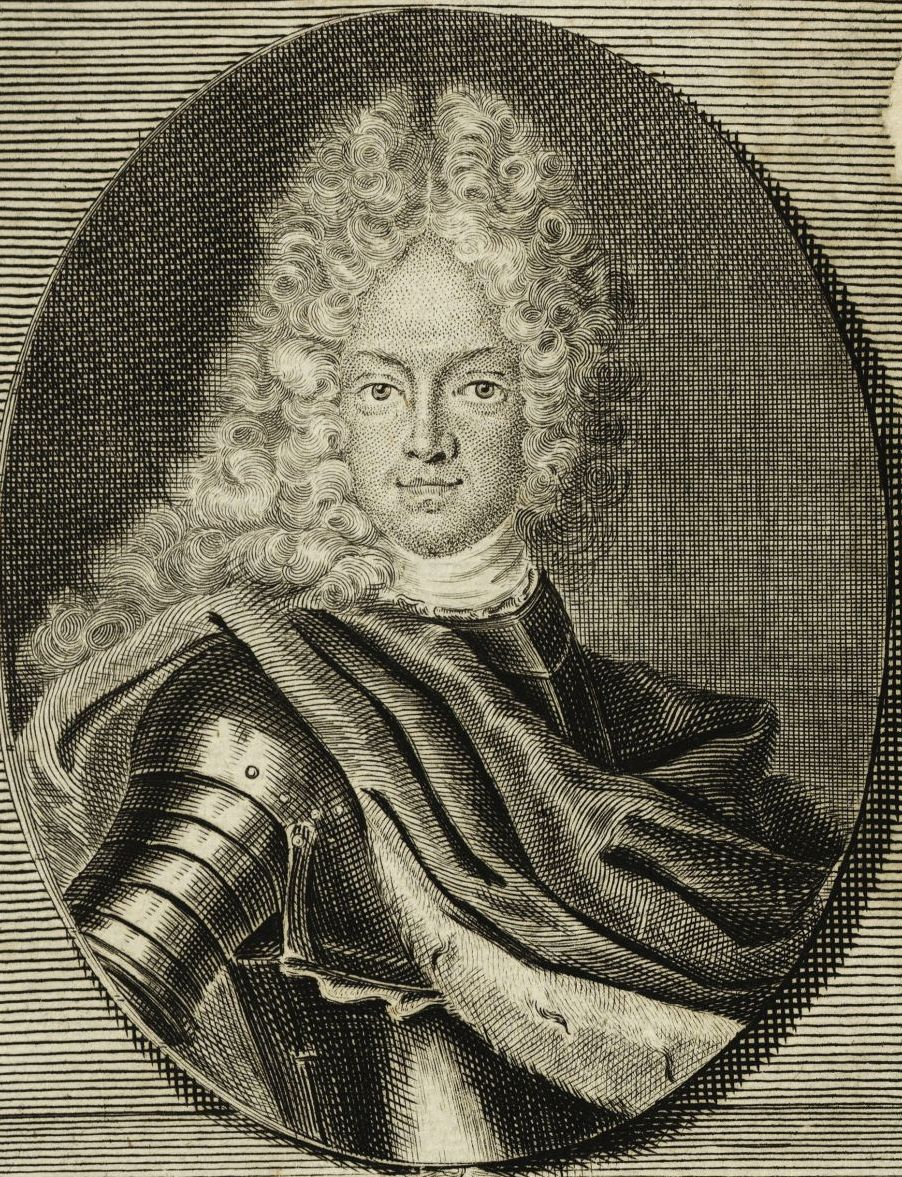
Leopold of Schleswig-Holstein-Sonderburg-Wiesenburg around 1740

Leopold of Schleswig-Holstein-Sonderbourg-Wiesenbourg (Brzeg, 12 January 1674 - Vienna, 4 March 1744) was the 3rd Duke of Schleswig-Holstein-Sonderburg-Wiesenburg and Knight in the Order of the Golden Fleece since 1721.

== Biography ==
Leopold was the third and last Duke of the House of Schleswig-Holstein-Sonderburg-Wiesenburg. He was the only son of Friedrich (1651–1724) and Karolina of Legnica-Brieg (1652–1707). Leopold succeeded his father as Duke when he died in 1724.

Since 1721 he owned Wetzdorf Castle, which he inherited from his aunt Duchess Magdalena Sophie Eleonora von Schleswig-Holstein (1664–1720), abbess in Quedlinburg. Since 1723 he was also heir to Rohrbach. On 25 June 1723, he acquired from his father for 110,000 thaler, Wiesenburg Castle with the associated lands. Already on 24 January 1725, he sold it for 126,400 thaler to August II of Saxony.
He then went to Vienna, where he was a member of the Imperial council at the court of Charles VI.

=== Marriage and children ===
Leopold converted to the Catholic faith and married on 3 May 1715 with Princess Maria Elisabeth von Liechtenstein (1683–1744), daughter of Hans-Adam I, Prince of Liechtenstein

They had five daughters :

1. Theresia (1713-1745), who married Johann Aloys I, Prince of Oettingen-Oettingen-Spielberg (1707–1780):
  1. Marie Leopoldine (1741–1795), who married Ernst Christoph, Prince of Kaunitz (1737–1797). Her only child, Countess Eleonore of Kaunitz-Rietberg, was the first wife of Klemens Wenzel, Prince von Metternich.
  2. Marie Charlotte (b. and d. 1743)
  3. Maria Eleonore (1745–1812), who married Prince Karl Borromäus of Liechtenstein.
2. Eleonora (1715-1760), who married Giuseppe Gonzaga, the last Duke of Guastalla. No issue.
3. Gabriela (1716-1798), who married Karl Frederick of Fürstenberg-Möskirch. No issue.
4. Charlotte (1718-1765), who married Charles Thomas, Prince of Löwenstein-Wertheim-Rochefort. Her only daughter, Leopoldine, married Charles Albert II, Prince of Hohenlohe-Waldenburg-Schillingsfürst.
5. Antonia (1721-1735), who died aged fourteen.
