= George William, Duke of Liegnitz =

Last duke from the House of Piast

George William IV
- Duke of Legnica, Brzeg
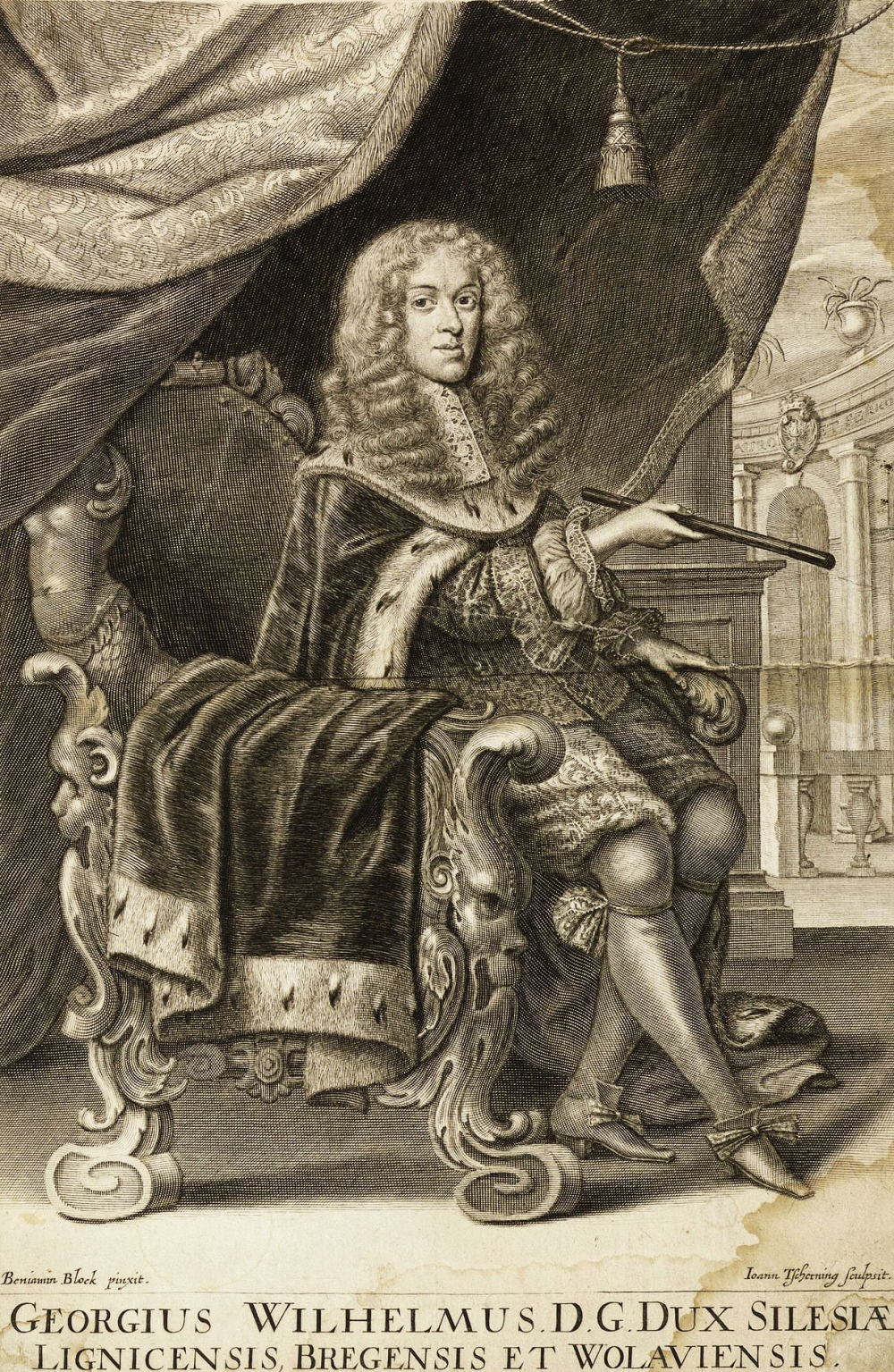
- Georgius Wilhelmus D.G. Dux Silesiae, engraving by Jan Tscherning (1650–53)
- Born: 26 September 1660; Oława, Duchy of Legnica, Crown of Bohemia (now in Poland)
- Died: 21 November 1675 (aged 15); Brzeg, Duchy of Brzeg, Crown of Bohemia (now in Poland)
- Buried: Church of St. John in Legnica
- Noble family: Silesian Piasts
- Father: Christian, Duke of Liegnitz and Brieg
- Mother: Louise of Anhalt-Dessau

George William (German: Georg Wilhelm; Polish: Jerzy Wilhelm) was the last Silesian duke of Legnica (Liegnitz) and Brzeg (Brieg) from 1672 until his death. He was the last male member of the Silesian Piast dynasty descending from Władysław II the Exile (1105–1159), as well as the last legitimate male member of the entire House of Piast.

== Family ==
George IV was the eldest but only surviving son of Duke Christian of Legnica-Brzeg and Louise, daughter of prince John Casimir of Anhalt-Dessau. He had three siblings:

- Karolina of Legnica-Brieg (1652–1707), last Silesian Piast duchess, married to Frederick, Duke of Schleswig-Holstein-Sonderburg-Wiesenburg (1651–1724) in 1672;
- Louise (1657–1660);
- Christian Louis (1664).

As the only surviving son, George IV was the sole heir to his father's possessions. Duke Christian of Legnica-Brzeg had spent many years in exile in Poland and in the Duchy of Prussia during the Thirty Years' War, after George William's grandfather Duke John Christian of Brieg had fallen out of favour with the Habsburg emperor Ferdinand II.

Duke Christian became sole ruler over the Silesian duchies of Legnica and Brzeg in 1664. After the abdication of King John II Casimir Vasa of Poland in 1668, he even put forward his candidacy for the Polish throne; to win the affection and support of the old nobility, he initially wanted to give his newborn son an old Piast name (like Mieszko or Bolesław); however, the Calvinist clergy of his duchy opposed this, maintaining that the idea could bring the return to paganism over Poland. The duke, however, saw to it that his son spoke Polish and wore Polish clothes.

== Life ==
The deaths in 1663 and 1664 of his paternal uncles Duke George III of Brzeg and Duke Louis IV of Legnica without surviving issue left him as the only heir of his father in the still vast Duchy of Legnica-Brzeg. As a result, since his early years, George William received a careful education. During his upbringing, he was put in the hands of the Anhalt-Bernburg count-marshal August Friedrich Bohne, and the personal doctor Henry Martini. During this first period of his education, he acquired an excellent knowledge of German, French and Latin, also understood Italian, Spanish and Polish; he was also educated in theology, philosophy, and rhetoric.

After his father's death in 1672, the then twelve-year-old George William succeeded him as Duke of Legnica and Brzeg; during his minority, the regency was exercised by his mother, Dowager Duchess Louise who held the towns of Wołów and Oława as her dower (wittum). Fearing claims raised by the Habsburg Emperor Leopold I in his capacity as ruler over the Crown of Bohemia, Duke Christian had devised by will that his son was formally under the tutelage of his maternal uncle Prince John George II of Anhalt-Dessau and the mighty Hohenzollern elector Frederick William of Brandenburg. The day before his father's death, Louise sent her son to study at the Viadrina University in Brandenburgian Frankfurt/Oder, considered as an act of mistrust by the Imperial court. On the other hand, the regency of the dowager duchess faced the opposition of the Protestant estates of Legnica-Brzeg, thanks to her increasingly open support for the Catholic faith; a major scandal occurred when the young duke's sister Karolina secretly married Frederick, a member of the aristocrat Catholic family of Schleswig-Holstein-Sonderburg-Wiesenburg.

The Brandenburg elector reached an understanding with the Habsburg emperor, and in 1673 George William returned to Brzeg, where he received the homage by the estates. On 14 March 1675, the young duke could take formal possession of the government of his lands after he went to the Imperial court in Vienna, making his solemn homage to Emperor Leopold I, who confirmed his coming of age and the succession to his father's lands. Immediately after the beginning of George William's rule, Duchess Louise was forced to give up her area of Wołów.

The announcements of the start of a good and prosperous government by George William were stopped with the sudden death of the duke on 21 November 1675. The cause of his death was an intense fever, developed shortly after his return from a hunt, the first sign of smallpox. The duke was buried in the church of St. John in Legnica, alongside his father, where his grieved mother had a mausoleum built.

== Legacy ==
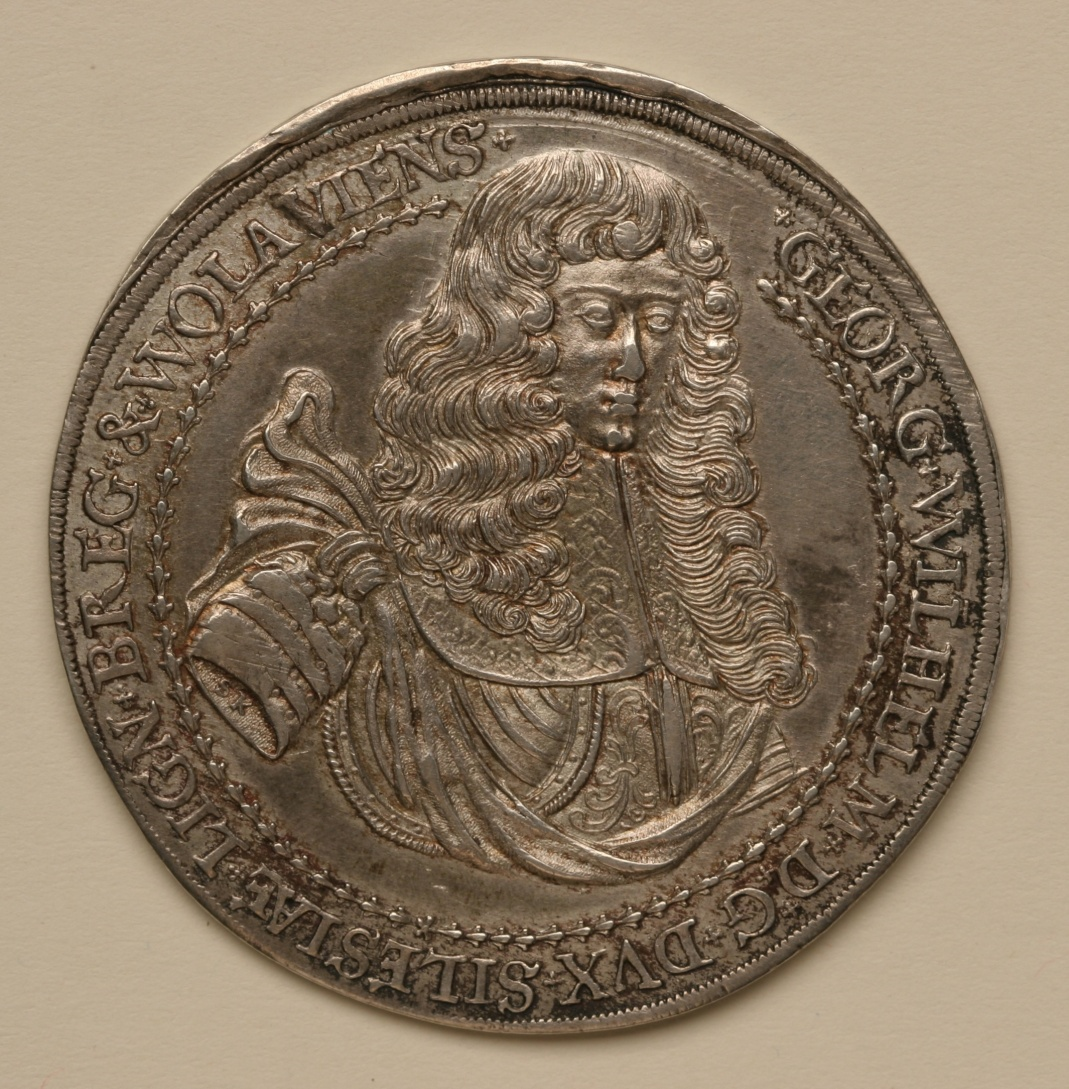
Funerary medal, 1675

Upon his death, the Duchy of Legnica-Brzeg reverted to Emperor Leopold as ruler over the Bohemian crown lands, which since 1526 were integral part of the Austrian Habsburg monarchy. Leopold took up the government by a Landeshauptmann deputy, despite the claims of George William's morganatic uncle Count August of Legnica, and had several Counter-Reformation measures implemented. Duchess Louise retained her lands of Oława until her death in 1680, when they were also incorporated into the Bohemian lands.

The independent Masovian Piasts had died out in 1526, while the Teschen (Cieszyn) line had become extinct in 1653. George William was therefore the last ruling member of all the Piast dynasty, which finally became extinct with the death of his only surviving sibling, Karolina, in 1707. The term "Piast dynasty" was first used by the Polish historian Adam Naruszewicz in his books History of Poland, which he started in 1779. On George William's burial crypt a text was carved referring to him as the last of the Piast dukes of Silesia, who are since the 17th century referred to as "Silesian Piasts".

Patrilineal descent

Patrilineal descent, descent from father to son, is the principle behind membership in royal houses, as it can be traced back through the generations.

George William, Duke of Liegnitz was the last legitimate male of the Piast dynasty. Descent before Mieszko I is partly fictional. This is the descent of the primary male heir.

1. Chościsko
2. Piast the Wheelwright
3. Siemowit
4. Lestko, b. 870–880
5. Siemomysł, d. 950–960
6. Mieszko I of Poland, 920/45-992
7. Bolesław I Chrobry, 967–1025
8. Mieszko II Lambert, 990–1034
9. Casimir I the Restorer, 1016–1058
10. Władysław I Herman, 1044–1102
11. Bolesław III Wrymouth, 1086–1138
12. Władysław II the Exile, 1105–1159
13. Bolesław I the Tall, 1127–1201
14. Henry I the Bearded, 1165/70–1238
15. Henry II the Pious, 1196–1241
16. Bolesław II the Bald, 1220/5-1278
17. Henry V the Fat, 1248–1296
18. Bolesław III the Generous, 1291–1352
19. Ludwik I the Fair, 1321–1398
20. Henry VII of Brzeg, 1343/45-1399
21. Henryk IX of Lubin, 1369–1420
22. Ludwik III of Oława, 1405–1441
23. John I of Lüben, 1425–1453
24. Frederick I of Legnica, 1446–1488
25. Frederick II of Legnica, 1480–1547
26. George II of Brieg, 1523–1586
27. Joachim Frederick of Brieg, 1550–1602
28. John Christian of Brieg, 1591–1639
29. Christian, Duke of Brieg, 1618–1672
30. George William, Duke of Liegnitz, 1660–1675

George William, Duke of Liegnitz House of Piast Born: 20 September 1660 Died: 21 November 1675
Preceded by Christian	Duke of Legnica; 1672–1675	Succeeded by States annexed to Bohemia
Preceded by Christian	Duke of Brzeg; 1672–1675	Succeeded by States annexed to Bohemia
