= Ludwig Hofmaier =

German business man, sportsman and actor

Ludwig Hofmaier, known as Handstand-Lucki, (born 8 December 1941) is a German businessman, former gymnast, and actor.

== Life ==
Hofmaier, who is 1.55m tall, was born in Saal an der Donau, the son of a tailor, and grew up in a family of ten. He attended a Hauptschule ("general school"). He reached the rank of a sergeant in the armed forces.

Hofmaier was champion gymnast of Bavaria in 1961 and he went on to win the Upper Palatinate championship six times. According to media reports, Hofmaier was also the German champion in apparatus gymnastics. He is considered the first German to have mastered the "Yamashita leap" (associated with gymnast Haruhiro Yamashita).

After hand walking from Saal an der Donau to Regensburg (a distance of 20 km), and then from Regensburg to Munich (132 km), in 1967 Hofmaier walked on his hands the 1070 km-long stretch from Regensburg to Rome. Since then he has been the "world champion of handwalking". He played the lead role in the short film Play Harlekin (1966) by Wendl Sorgend.

He ran three pubs in the meantime: the "Kongo-Bar" on Neupfarrplatz, the "Aquarium" in Pfarrergasse, and the "Arco-Bräu-Stuben" in Adolf-Schmetzer-Straße. From the beginning of the 1970s he ran the "Apollo" disco in Steinberg am See. He has lived since the early 1970s in Offenburg, where he has established himself as an antiques dealer.
