= Alois Gonzaga of Liechtenstein =

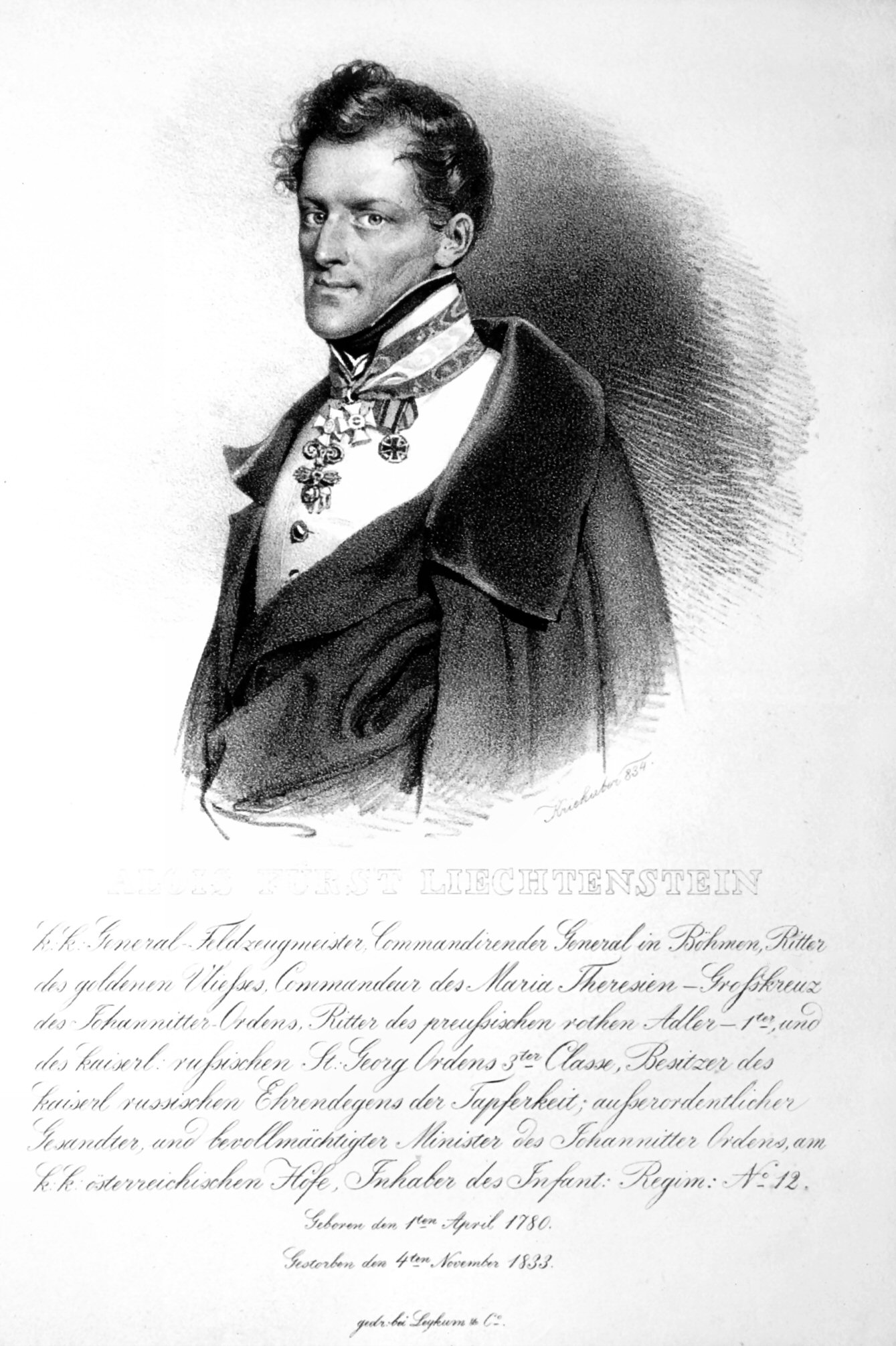
Prince Alois Liechtenstein, lithograph by Josef Kriehuber (1834)

Prince Alois Gonzaga of Liechtenstein (1 April 1780 – 4 November 1833) was an Imperial Feldzeugmeister during the Napoleonic Wars.

== Biography ==
He was born in Vienna on 1 April 1780. He was the youngest son of the Imperial Field Marshal Prince Karl Borromäus of Liechtenstein (1730–1789) and his wife Princess Maria Eleonora von Öttingen-Öttingen (1745–1812). He was the brother of Joseph Wenzel (1767–1842), a priest in Salzburg and Moritz (1775–1819), a Field Marshal Lieutenant.

Alois Gonzaga began, like his father and brothers, a military career in the Imperial army in 1798 as a lieutenant. He participated in the War of the Second Coalition as an Oberleutnant, was promoted to Hauptmann, participated in the Campaign in Switzerland (1799) and was promoted to Major to lead the "Regiment No. 12" in 1800.

In the campaign of 1801, he was wounded at Schongau, Bavaria and taken prisoner by the French. After the peace and his promotion to Lieutenant colonel, he was awarded the "Knight's Cross" of the Order of Maria Theresa on 18 August 1801.

During the War of the Third Coalition, he was a colonel and on 20 October 1805, he was taken again prisoner by the French together with the entire Imperial army, after the Battle of Ulm.

In 1809 he was promoted to Major general and Franz I made him Inhaber of his "Regiment No. 12" for life. He participated as a brigade commander in the 1809 campaign in Bavaria and on the Danube. Alois Gonzaga was severely wounded at the Battle of Teugen-Hausen and was immediately sent to Vienna for treatment. Emperor Franz personally went to his hospital bed and gave him the Commander's Cross of the Order of Maria Theresa.

In 1812, Alois Gonzaga commanded a brigade and distinguished himself in battle. In 1813, as a Lieutenant field marshal, he commanded an army division and fought at Dresden and Leipzig. In 1814, he was commander of an Army corps in France, with which he took Besançon after a siege of almost 4 months. In 1815, he commanded the Austrian reserve corps.

After the war, he was close to the Emperor and in December 1826 became commanding general in Moravia and from July 1829 until his death, commanding general in Bohemia. On 21 October 1830, he was promoted to Feldzeugmeister and Emperor Franz made him a knight of the Austrian Order of the Golden Fleece.

Alois Gonzaga of Liechtenstein died unmarried in Prague at the age of 53 on 4 November 1833.
