= Christian, Duke of Brieg =

Christian
- Duke of Legnica, Brzeg, Wołów, Oława
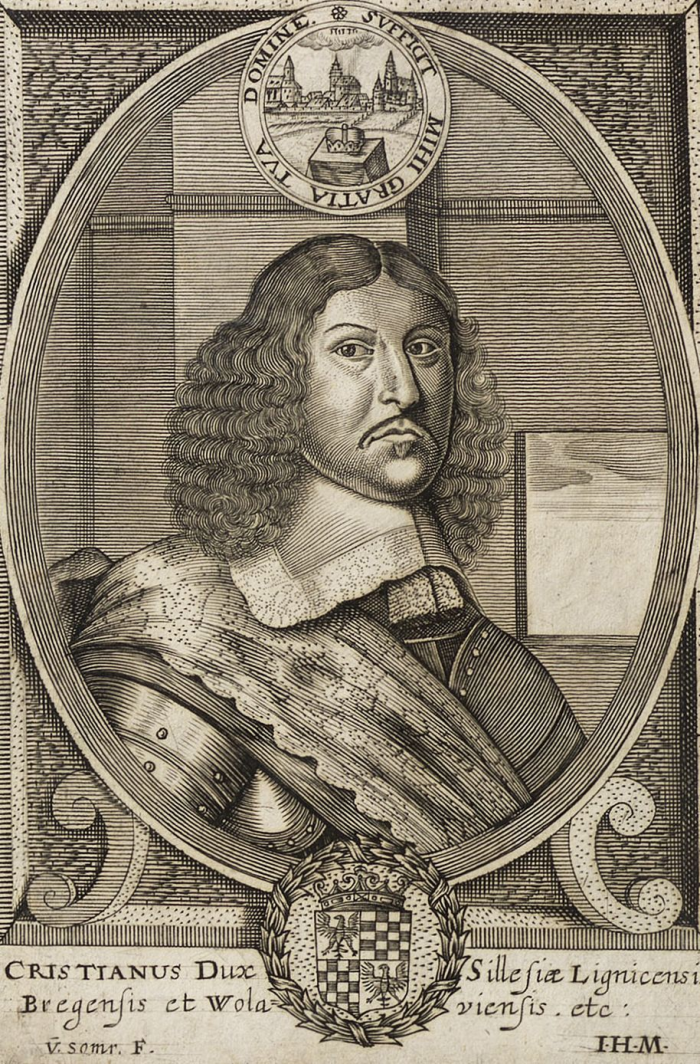
- Born: 19 April 1618; Oława, Silesia
- Died: 28 February 1672 (aged 53); Oława
- Buried: Church of St. John in Legnica
- Noble family: Silesian Piasts
- Spouse: Louise of Anhalt-Dessau
- Issue: Karolina; George William, Duke of Liegnitz
- Father: John Christian of Brieg
- Mother: Dorothea Sybille of Brandenburg

Christian of Brieg-Legnica (German: Christian von Liegnitz-Brieg, Polish: Chrystian Brzeski-Legnicki, Czech: Kristián Břežsko-Lehnický; 19 April 1618 in Oława – 28 February 1672 in Oława) was a Duke of Liegnitz/Legnica (during 1653–1654 and 1663–1664 with his brothers), Brieg/Brzeg (during 1639–1654 with his brothers), Wohlau/Wołów (during 1653–1654 with his brothers, then alone) and Oława (during 1639–1654 with his brothers, then alone). Since 1664, he was the sole ruler as Duke of Legnica-Brzeg-Wołów-Oława. He is descended from the Legnica branch of the Silesian Piasts dynasty.

He was the seventh but third surviving son of John Christian, Duke of Brieg/Brzeg-Liegnitz/Legnica-Wohlau/Wołów-Ohlau/Oława, by his first wife Dorothea Sybille, daughter of John George, Elector of Brandenburg.

== Life ==
In his early years, along with his older brothers, Christian made his Grand Tour to Europe, during which he visited the courts of Kings Louis XIII of France and Charles I of England. Upon his return to Silesia, his country was in the middle of the Thirty Years' War. In 1635 the Duke John Christian was sent to Lithuania; at that time, Christian studied in a Calvinist school. During this time, he was allowed to know, among others, King John Casimir of Poland, whose wife Louisa Maria was the godmother of Christian's short-lived second daughter. Also met his first cousin, Prince Bogusław Radziwiłł, whose mother was the sister of Christian's mother. He also knew another future Polish monarch, Michał Korybut Wiśniowiecki. Through teachings at the school in, Christian could learn and mastered the Polish language.

In 1639 Duke John Christian died and his sons inherited their lands. Christian became in Duke of Brzeg and Oława with their brothers George III and Louis IV; however, the full government of the Duchy was taken by the eldest brother George III.

After finishing the school Christian returned to Silesia, still under the hands of the Swedish army. In 1642 he survived the 4-week siege of Brieg/Brzeg by the Swedish. In December 1645 was captured and imprisoned by the Swedish. Fortunately, Christian managed to escape and notify the Brieg/Brzeg townspeople who have who were their true master. However, the conditions of his short confinement left him in a poor health. Apart from the incident with the Swedish, he was shot in the foot while hunting.

The death of his uncle George Rudolf in 1653 increased the domains of the brothers, added to their lands Legnica and Wołów. One year later (1654), was made the formal division of their domains: George III retain Brieg/Brzeg and Louis IV obtain Liegnitz/Legnica. To Christian, were assigned the two poor and small towns of Wohlau/Wołów and Ohlau/Oława.

In 1663 Louis IV died without surviving issue, and Liegnitz/Legnica was inherited by Christian and George III as co-rulers; however, George III died a few months later (1664) without male heirs and Christian could inherit all the lands of the family for the first time since 1547.

In 1668 Christian presented his candidacy to the Polish throne. However, despite the support for the Polish nobility, he wasn't chosen as King.

Christian died on 28 February 1672, due to a disease called "Swelling water" (Polish: Puchlina wodna). His funeral was held on 31 March 1672 in Liegnitz/Legnica, in the Church of St.John, in a gold-plated coffin, thanks to the contribution of gold coins from his subjects.

== Marriage and issue ==
In Dessau on 24 November 1648, Christian married with Louise (b. Dessau, 10 February 1631 – d. Oława, 25 April 1680), daughter of John Casimir, Prince of Anhalt-Dessau. They had four children:

1. Karolina (b. Brzeg, 2 December 1652 – d. Wrocław, 24 December 1707), married on 4 July 1672 to Frederick, Duke of Schleswig-Holstein-Sonderburg-Wiesenburg.
2. Louise (b. Oława, 28 July 1657 – d. Oława, 6 February 1660).
3. George William (b. Oława, 29 September 1660 – d. Brzeg, 21 November 1675).
4. Christian Louis (b. 15 January 1664 – d. 27 February 1664).

In his will, Christian left Oława and Wołów to his wife as dower to rule until her own death.

Christian, Duke of Brieg House of Piast Born: 9 April 1618 Died: 28 February 1672
Preceded by John Christian	Duke of Brzeg; 1633–1654 with George III; Louis IV	Succeeded by George III
Preceded by John Christian	Duke of Oława; 1633–1672 with George III; Louis IV	Succeeded by Louise
Preceded by George Rudolf	Duke of Legnica; 1653–1654 with George III; Louis IV	Succeeded by Louis IV
Preceded by George Rudolf	Duke of Wołów; 1653–1672 with George III (1653); Louis IV (1653)	Succeeded by Louise
Preceded by Louis IV	Duke of Legnica; 1663–1672 with George III (1663–1664)	Succeeded by George William
Preceded by George III	Duke of Brzeg; 1664–1672	Succeeded by George William
