= Louise of Anhalt-Dessau =

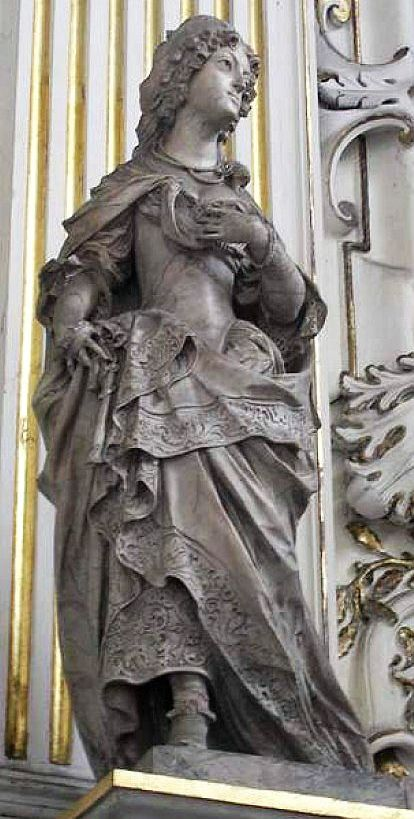
Alabaster statue of Princess Louise of Anhalt-Dessau: The Piasts Mausoleum in St. John the Baptist Church, Legnica

Louise of Anhalt-Dessau (German: Luise; 10 February 1631, in Dessau – 25 April 1680, in Ohlau), was a German princess (German: Fürstin) of the House of Ascania in the branch of Anhalt-Dessau and by marriage Duchess of Legnica, Brzeg, Wołów, and Oława.

She was the fifth child (but third daughter) of John Casimir, Prince of Anhalt-Dessau, by his first wife Agnes, daughter of Maurice, Landgrave of Hesse-Kassel.

== Life ==
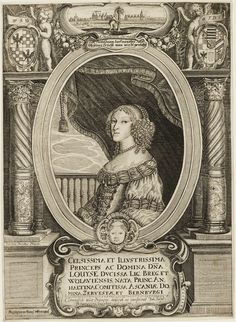
Louise of Anhalt-Dessau (1656)

Louise married Christian, Duke of Brieg-Oława, on 24 November 1648 in her native city of Dessau. At that time, her husband was only co-ruler with his older brothers George III and Louis IV. Only four years later, in 1652, Louise gave birth to her first child, a daughter called Karolina.

One year after receiving the inheritance of their uncle George Rudolf of Legnica in 1653, George III, Louis IV, and Christian decided to divide up their domains; Christian obtained the small and poor duchies of Wołów and Oława. Louise and her husband settled in Oława, where she gave birth in 1657 a second daughter, Louise, who died on 6 February 1660 at age thirty-two months. Seven months later, on 29 September, the Ducal couple's third child, the long-awaited son and heir, George William, was born. Louise had her fourth and last child in 1664, a second son called Christian Louis, who lived only one month.

The eventual inheritance of all the Legnica lands to Christian seemed inevitable, since none of his older brothers had surviving male issue. The deaths of Louis IV in 1663 and George III in 1664 finally left Christian as sole ruler of all the family lands.

Duke Christian died on 28 February 1672. His only surviving son, George William, succeeded him in Legnica-Brzeg, but because he was a minor, the regency was held by his mother Louise, who was the regnant Duchess of Wołów-Oława as her dower, in accordance with her husband's will.

The Duchess-Regent, who was a tolerant and generous person, financially assisted the Catholics, thereby earning the hatred of the Protestant population of the Duchy. They decided to accelerate the formal proclamation of the young Duke George William as an adult. Despite Louise's protests, Emperor Leopold I declared George Wilhelm an adult and ruler of his Duchy as of 14 March 1675. One of the first acts of the Duke was to strip his mother of Wołów, a part of her dower. However, George William's reign was short; he died eight months later, on 21 November, a victim of smallpox. Without issue, the House of Piast became extinct in the male line with him.

Louise retained her dower lands and retired to Oława, where she spend her last years constructing the Baroque Silesian Piast mausoleum at the church of St. John the Baptist in Legnica, also called the Piasteum, where she had buried the remains of her husband, son, and some of their ancestors. She died in 1680 and was buried next to her husband. Her estates were taken over by her overlord, the Habsburg king of Bohemia.

Louise of Anhalt-Dessau House of Ascania Born: 10 February 1631 Died: 25 April 1680
Preceded by Christian	Duchess of Oława and Wołów; 1672–1680	Reverted to royal domain
