= Saal an der Donau (Verwaltungsgemeinschaft) =

- Verwaltungsgemeinschaft
- Location of Saal an der Donau within Kelheim district
- Interactive map of Saal an der Donau
- Location within Germany Location within Bavaria
- Coordinates: 48°54′N 11°56′E
- Country: Germany
- State: Bavaria
- Admin. region: Lower Bavaria
- District: Kelheim
- Seat: Saal an der Donau
- Subdivisions: 2 municipalities

Area
  - Total: 61.08 km^{2} (23.58 sq mi)

Population (2025-12-31)
  - Total: 7,482
  - Density: 122.5/km^{2} (317.3/sq mi)
- Time zone: UTC+01:00 (CET)
  - Summer (DST): UTC+02:00 (CEST)
- Website: www.saal-donau.de

Saal an der Donau is a Verwaltungsgemeinschaft (municipal association) in the district of Kelheim in Bavaria, Germany. Its seat is in Saal an der Donau.

It consists of the following municipalities:

1. Saal an der Donau
2. Teugn
