= Teugn =

- Municipality
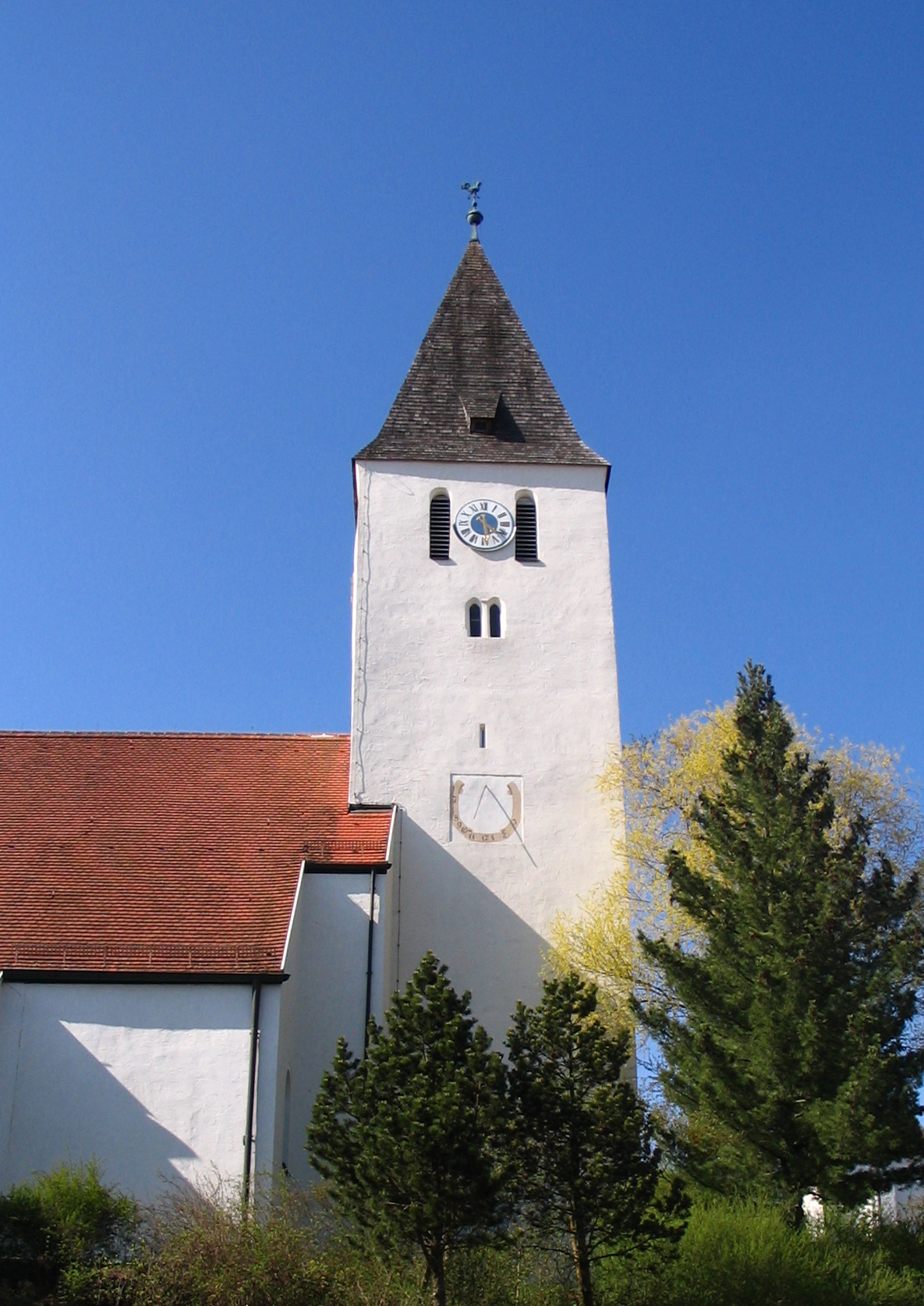
- Church of the Assumption of the Virgin Mary

- Coat of arms

- Location of Teugn within Kelheim district
- Interactive map of Teugn
- Location within Germany Location within Bavaria
- Coordinates: 48°54′N 12°1′E
- Country: Germany
- State: Bavaria
- Admin. region: Niederbayern
- District: Kelheim
- Municipal assoc.: Saal an der Donau

Government
  - Mayor (2020–26): Manfred Jackermeier (CSU)

Area
  - Total: 17.07 km^{2} (6.59 sq mi)
- Elevation: 379 m (1,243 ft)

Population (2025-12-31)
  - Total: 1,723
  - Density: 100.9/km^{2} (261.4/sq mi)
- Time zone: UTC+01:00 (CET)
  - Summer (DST): UTC+02:00 (CEST)
- Postal codes: 93356
- Dialling codes: 09405
- Vehicle registration: KEH
- Website: www.teugn.de

Teugn (German pronunciation: [ˈtɔʏɡn̩]; Bavarian: Deing) is a municipality in the district of Kelheim in Bavaria in Germany.

== History ==
Teugn was the site of the battle of Teugen-Hausen in 1809, when a French army led by Marshal Davout defeated an Austrian army led by Prince Friedrich Franz Xaver of Hohenzollern-Hechingen.

During World War II, a subcamp of the Nazi concentration camp Flossenbürg, named Ringberg Me, was installed nearby the street connecting Teugn and the neighboring village Saal an der Donau. The goal was to construct an underground arms industry plant for Messerschmitt, a German aircraft manufacturer. At peak times more than 600 men were imprisoned in the subcamp. After the war 20 bodies and the ashes of about 360 people were found.
