= Claude Petit =

French politician

Claude Petit (9 January 1871, Sidi Bel Abbès - 9 November 1966) was a French politician. He represented the Republican-Socialist Party in the Chamber of Deputies from 1919 to 1928.
