= Prince Joseph Wenzel Franz Anastasius of Liechtenstein =

Prince Joseph Wenzel Franz Anastasius of Liechtenstein (1767–1842) was an Austrian nobleman and general.

== Life ==
He was the son of Prince Karl Borromäus of Liechtenstein and Princess Eleonore of Oettingen-Oettingen.

While still a child he was destined for the Catholic priesthood and so in 1774 – at the age of nine – he was sent by his father to start his religious life at the Cathedral of Cologne.

In 1783–4 (aged sixteen) he was living in Rovereto in the Italian Alps under the tutelage of ‘abate’ Carlo Tacchi (1745-1813), as recorded in the memoir of the Italian musician Giacomo Gotifredo Ferrari (1763–1842). Ferrari stated:

"I also entertained myself by giving [music] lessons for free [...] Prince Venceslao of Lichtenstein, canon of Cologne, was then in Roveredo [sic] in the house and under the care of his tutor, the brilliant Abbot Tachi [sic]. His Highness was my favourite student there, since he had talent, studied, and treated me with the greatest affability".

"On the first of November 1784 I left for Rome with Prince Lichtenstein and Abate Tacchi".

In the years 1785–6 the Prince was in Rome studying theology and living in the monastery of St. Stefano del Cacco, where he was described in the records as Eccellentissimo Principe Don Giuseppe Venceslao di Liechtenstein da Vienna, Canonico della Metropoli di Colonia. In Rome, in November 1786 the now nineteen-year old Prince came to make the acquaintance of the poet Johann Wolfgang von Goethe (1749-1832), who met him there at the Academy of Arcadia, a fashionable meeting-place for elite men and well-known literary and artistic figures.

The Prince was ordained into the Catholic priesthood in 1788.

After the prince's time in Rome, and on the advice of Cardinal Garampi (1725–92) he continued his studies at a French seminary, eventually being made a Canon in Salzburg. After this, however, a military career attracted him more than a priestly career and in 1804 he received secularisation in Rome and then joined the Austrian army, which he left as Major General in 1814; he died in 1842.
