= Schleswig-Holstein-Sonderburg-Wiesenburg =

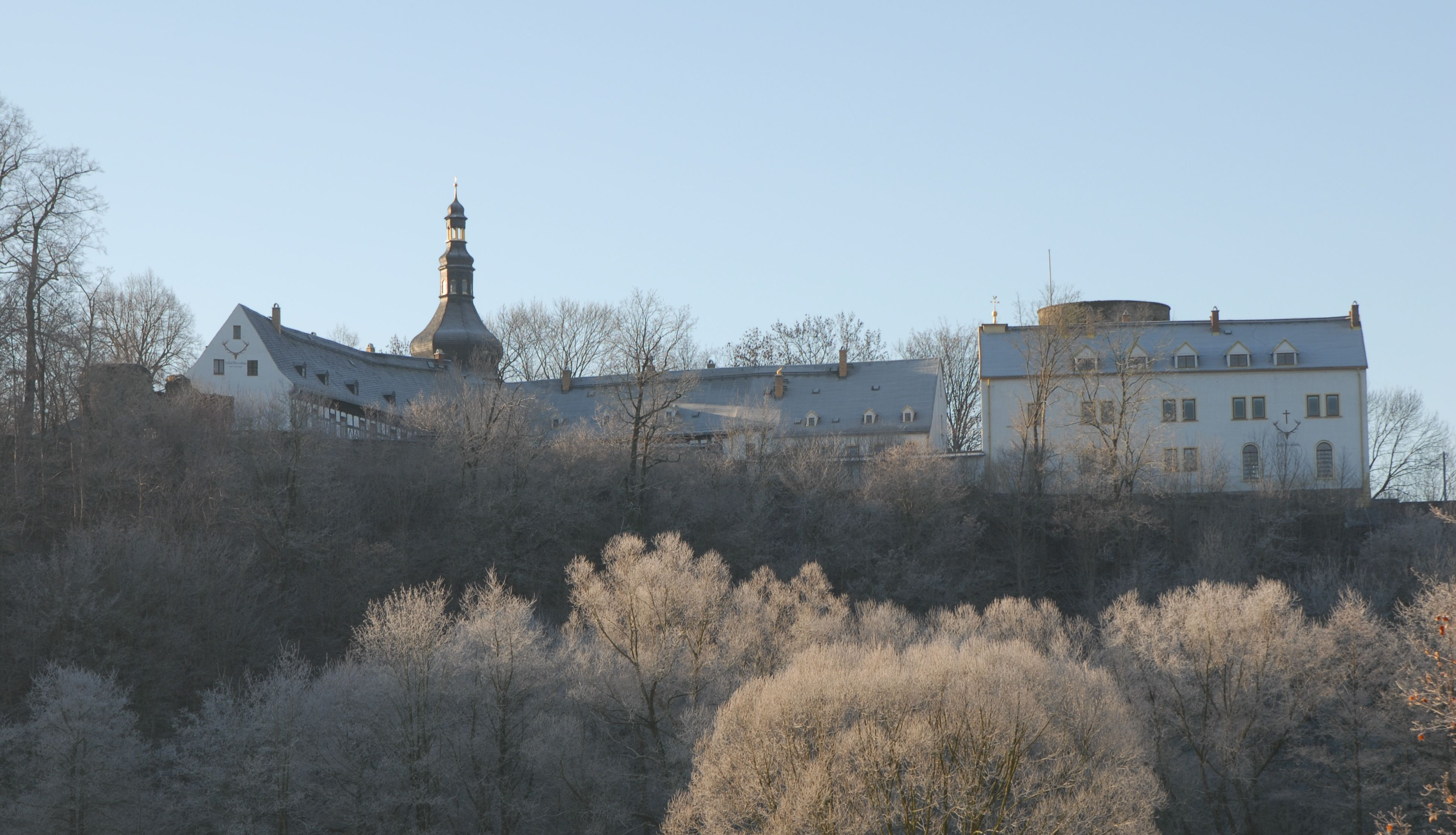
Wiesenburg Castle in Saxony gave its name to this branch of the ducal family

The House of Schleswig-Holstein-Sonderburg-Wiesenburg was one of the many cadet branches of the House of Schleswig-Holstein-Sonderburg, itself a junior line of the Oldenburg dynasty. Although the members possessed the title of duke in Denmark and in the Holy Roman Empire, they held property in and derived income from allotted sections of the Duchy of Schleswig-Holstein, but sovereignty over these lands remained in the authority of their pater familias, the king of Denmark.

== Background ==
The founder of the line was Philip Louis (1620–1689). He purchased the Amt of Wiesenburg in the Erzgebirgskreis in Saxony, including a castle, town and 18 villages in 1664 from John George II, Elector of Saxony, but without any sovereign privileges. He made what initially appeared to be a failing investment in the mining industry in Schneeberg and Neustädtel. But in the 1670s he made large profits and became a wealthy mining entrepreneur. In 1675, Philip Louis sold Wiesenburg Castle, which he had renovated, with the surrounding land and sovereign rights for 100000Taler to his eldest son, Frederick (1651–1724), who served as an imperial lieutenant general in Hungary. In 1686, Philip Louis bought Oberkotzau in Franconia from Christian Ernst, Margrave of Brandenburg-Bayreuth. He died in 1689 in Oberkotzau.

His son Frederick was unhappily married with Karolina of Legnica-Brieg (1652–1707) until she divorced him in 1680. He sold Wiesenburg in 1723 to his only son Leopold (1674–1744), who sold it shortly after Frederick's death. King August II of Poland bought the castle in 1725 for 126400Taler. Duke Leopold had reverted to Catholicism, and married Princess Marie Elisabeth of Liechtenstein (1683–1744). He was a secret Imperial Councillor and Knight of the Order of the Golden Fleece (Nr.648). He had five daughters and no male heirs. The line of Schleswig-Holstein-Sonderburg-Wiesenburg died out with Duke Leopold.

== List of Dukes ==
Reign	Name	Remarks
1664–1685	Philip Louis (1620–1689)	first duke, youngest son of Alexander of Schleswig-Holstein-Sonderburg
1685–1723	Frederick (1651–1724)	Son of Philip Louis, a major general in Hungary, Knight of the Order of the Elephant
1723–1725	Leopold (1674–1744)	Son of Frederick, secret Imperial Councillor in Vienna

== Bibliography ==
- Carsten Porskrog Rasmussen, E. Imberger, D. Lohmeier, I. Mommsen (eds.): Die Fürsten des Landes. Herzöge und Grafen von Schleswig-Holstein und Lauenburg, Wachholtz Verlag, Neumünster, 2008, ISBN 978-3-529-02606-5
