= Eleonore of Liechtenstein =

- Princess Karl Borromäus of Liechtenstein
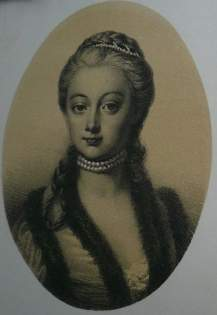
- Born: 7 July 1745; Oettingen
- Died: 26 November 1812 (aged 67); Vienna
- Spouse: Prince Karl Borromäus of Liechtenstein (m. 1761; died 1789)
- Issue: Princess Maria Josepha Eleonore Nicolaus; Prince Karl Joseph Emanuel Albinus; Prince Joseph Wenzel Franz Anastasius; Prince Emanuel Joseph Kaspar Melchior Balthasar; Prince Moritz Joseph Johann Baptist Viktor; Prince Franz de Paula Joseph Aloys Crispin; Prince Alois Gonzaga
Names
- Maria Eleonore
- House: Oettingen-Spielberg
- Father: Johann Aloys I, 2nd Prince of Oettingen-Spielberg
- Mother: Princess Therese of Schleswig-Holstein-Sonderburg-Wiesenburg

Maria Eleonore of Liechtenstein (née Princess Eleonore of Oettingen-Oettingen and Oettingen-Spielberg (Oettingen, 7 July 1745 – Vienna, 26 November 1812) was a princess of Liechtenstein by marriage to Prince Karl Borromäus of Liechtenstein, and a politically influential Austrian salonist. Between 1768 and 1790, she acted as the political adviser of Emperor Joseph II through her salon or discussion circle.

== Life ==
She was born as a Princess of Oettingen-Oettingen and Oettingen-Spielberg, daughter of Johann Aloys I, 2nd Prince of Oettingen-Spielberg, and Princess Therese of Schleswig-Holstein-Sonderburg-Wiesenburg. Her mother died as a result of her birth.

She was raised and educated in a French convent in Strasbourg. When she was fifteen, she inherited vast estates from her aunt in Bohemia, and she and her sister Maria Leopoldine (1741–1795) were introduced at the imperial court in Vienna and appointed maid of honour to the empress Maria Theresa of Austria, during which service they became acquainted with the imperial family.

On 30 March 1761, in Vienna, she married Prince Karl Borromäus of Liechtenstein. She and her spouse were the ancestors of a line of the Princely Family of Liechtenstein. Eleonore spent her summers in her estates in Moravia and her winters in Vienna. She had a love affair with the Irish general Karl O'Donnell, Count of Tyrconnel, which attracted attention, but he died in 1771.

=== Salon of the Five Princesses ===
From 1768 onward, she held a discussion circle with a group of people including Emperor Joseph II, and through him became influential upon the affairs of state.

Joseph II was reportedly in love with Eleonore of Liechtenstein and attempted to convince her to be his mistress in 1771–1772, but she declined, and they became lifelong friends.

For two decades, her salon circle of five princesses exerted influence upon the affairs of state through their connection with Joseph II: their circle consisted of Princess Eleonore of Liechtenstein, Princess Maria Josepha von Clary und Aldringen (1728–1801), Princess Maria Sidonia Kinsky von Wchinitz und Tettau (1729–1815), and Princess Leopoldine of Liechtenstein (1733–1809); field marshal Count Franz Moritz von Lacy (1725–1801) and the chief of treasury Prince Franz Xaver Wolfgang von Orsini-Rosenberg (1723–1796) also frequently attended their discussion circle. They met once and, from 1780, four times a week to discuss politics. Eleonore's relation to Joseph was not in lack of tension, and she did disagree with his church politics, and criticized him on his restlessness.

The salon of the five princesses lost their influence as state advisers upon Joseph's death in 1790. During the Second Congress of Rastatt (1797–1799), she opposed the pro-French policy of chancellor Johann Amadeus von Thugut. She was also adverse to State Chancellor Klemens von Metternich, and she is pointed out to be behind his deposition as Dresden ambassador. She also opposed him arranging the marriage between Marie-Louise of Austria and emperor Napoleon in 1810.

Eleonore of Liechtenstein has left letters which give an important image of contemporary life in the Austrian court life.

== Issue ==
She had seven children:

- Princess Maria Josepha Eleonore Nicolaus (Vienna, 4 December 1763 – Vienna, 23 September 1833), married in Vienna on 29 January 1782 Count Johann Nepomuk von Harrach zu Rohrau und Thannhausen (Vienna, 17 May 1756 – Vienna, 11 April 1829), without issue.
- Prince Karl Joseph Emanuel Albinus (Vienna, 2 March 1765 – killed in duel in Vienna, 24 December 1795), married in Vienna on 28 September 1789 Countess Marianne Josepha von Khevenhüller-Metsch (Vienna, 19 November 1770 – Vienna, 10 August 1849), and had issue.
- Prince Joseph Wenzel Franz Anastasius (Vienna, 21 August 1767 – Vienna, 30 July 1842), a Priest in Salzburg.
- Prince Emanuel Joseph Kaspar Melchior Balthasar (Vienna, 6 January 1770 – Vienna, 20 February 1773).
- Prince Moritz Joseph Johann Baptist Viktor (Vienna, 21 July 1775 – Vienna, 24 March 1819), married in Eisenstadt on 13 April 1806 Princess Marie Leopoldine Esterházy von Galántha (Vienna, 31 January 1788 – Liebeschitz, 6 September 1846), and had issue.
- Prince Franz de Paula Joseph Aloys Crispin (Vienna, 26 October 1776 – of wounds received in battle on 23 June in Brussels, 27 June 1794), unmarried and without issue.
- Prince Aloys Gonzaga Joseph Franz de Paula Theodor (Vienna, 1 April 1780 – Prague, 4 November 1833), unmarried and without issue.
