= Saal an der Donau =

Place in Bavaria, Germany

- Municipality
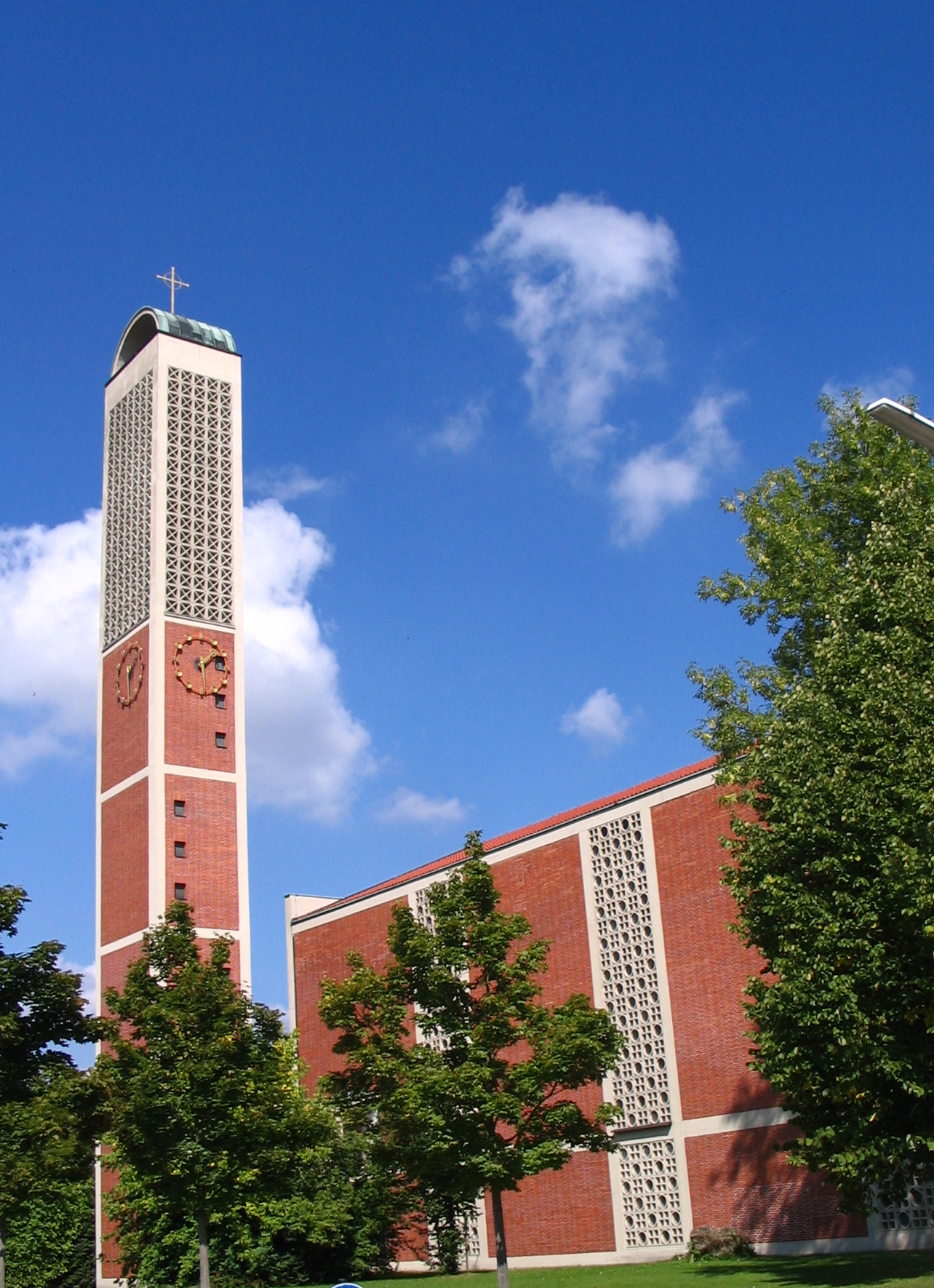
- Church of Christ, the King

- Coat of arms

- Location of Saal an der Donau within Kelheim district
- Interactive map of Saal an der Donau
- Location within Germany Location within Bavaria
- Coordinates: 48°53′N 11°55′E
- Country: Germany
- State: Bavaria
- Admin. region: Niederbayern
- District: Kelheim
- Municipal assoc.: Saal an der Donau
- Subdivisions: 15 Ortsteile

Government
  - Mayor (2020–26): Christian Nerb (FW)

Area
  - Total: 44.01 km^{2} (16.99 sq mi)
- Elevation: 346 m (1,135 ft)

Population (2025-12-31)
  - Total: 5,759
  - Density: 130.9/km^{2} (338.9/sq mi)
- Time zone: UTC+01:00 (CET)
  - Summer (DST): UTC+02:00 (CEST)
- Postal codes: 93342
- Dialling codes: 09441
- Vehicle registration: KEH
- Website: www.saal-donau.de

Saal an der Donau (German pronunciation: [ˈzaːl ʔan deːɐ̯ ˈdoːnaʊ], lit. 'Saal on the Danube'; Bavarian: Saal an da Donau) is a municipality in the district of Kelheim in Bavaria in Germany. It is located along the banks of the Danube, around 25 km southwest of Regensburg.

== Ortsteile ==
Villages affiliated to the administration (Ortsteil) of Saal are

- Buchhofen
- Reißing
- Mitterfecking
- Peterfecking
- Oberfecking
- Einmuß
- Seilbach
- Oberschambach
- Unterschambach
- Oberteuerting
- Unterteuerting
- Kleinberghofen
- Gstreifet
- Kleingiersdorf
- Felsenhäusl

== History ==
The first settlements in Regensburg date back to the ages of the Hallstatt culture.

Saal was first mentioned in a document in 1002. Apparently Saal was at that time owned by Henry II, then Duke of Bavaria, and given to the Niedermünster Abbey in Regensburg.

Already around 1530, the Thurn und Taxis family started to run a post-house in Saal. The German poet Johann Wolfgang von Goethe stopped during his journey to Italy on September 5, 1786, at 15h in Saal for swapping horses at the post-house. The post horn featuring the coat of arms of Saal today still reminds of this tradition.

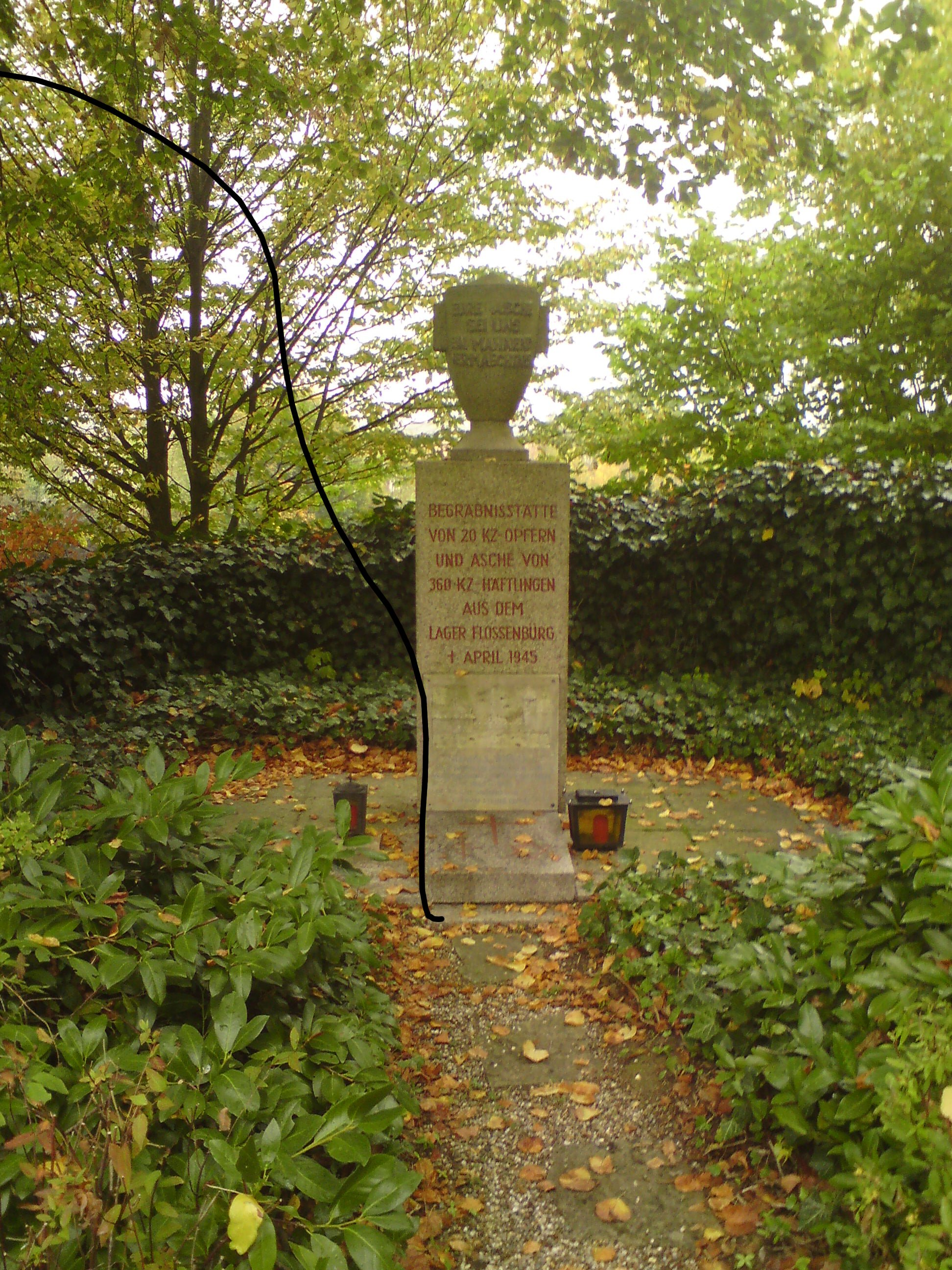
Concentration camp memorial in Saal

During World War II, a subcamp of the Nazi concentration camp Flossenbürg, named Ringberg Me, was installed nearby the street connecting Saal and the neighboring village Teugn. The goal was to construct an underground arms industry plant for Messerschmitt, a German aircraft manufacturer. At peak times more than 600 men were imprisoned in the subcamp. After the war 20 bodies and the ashes of about 360 people were found.
