= Frederick, Duke of Schleswig-Holstein-Sonderburg-Wiesenburg =

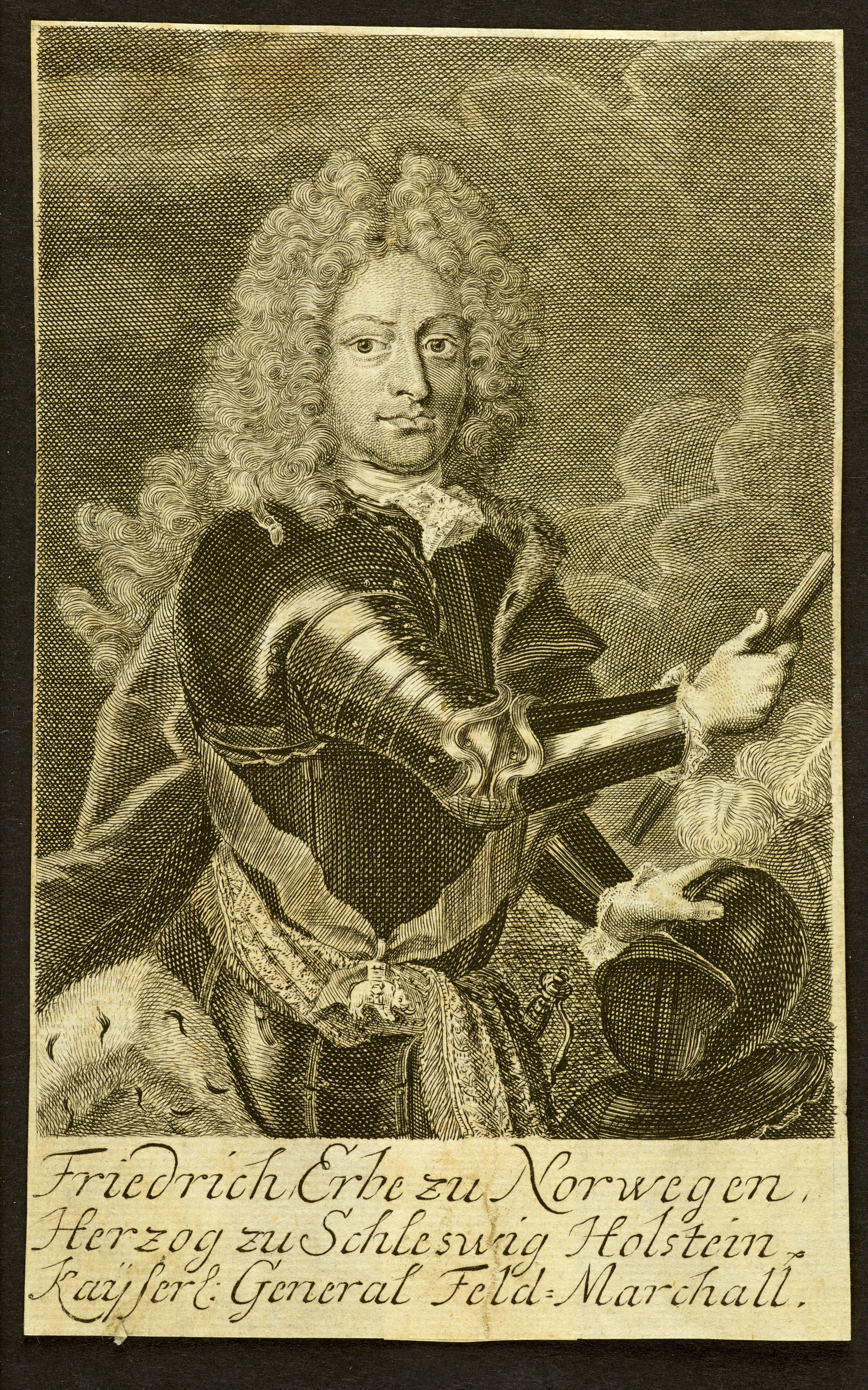
Portrait of the Duke (1716)

Frederick of Schleswig-Holstein-Sonderbourg-Wiesenbourg (Hasselhecke, Hessen-Homberg, 2 February 1652 - Wiesenburg Castle, 7 October 1724) was the 2nd Duke of Schleswig-Holstein-Sonderburg-Wiesenburg and an Imperial Field Marshal.

== Biography ==
Friedrich was the eldest son of Philip Louis, Duke of Schleswig-Holstein-Sonderburg-Wiesenburg (1620-1689) and Anna Margaret of Hesse-Homburg (1629–1686).

In 1672, he joined the Imperial Army as commander of a cuirassier regiment in Hungary. In 1676, he became a Generalfeldwachtmeister, in March 1689, a General of the cavalry and finally a Field Marshal in 1696. On 29 May 1676, he was awarded the Order of the Elephant in Copenhagen.

Already on 14 July 1672 he had secretly married at Brzeg Castle the last Silesian Piast, Karolina of Legnica-Brieg (1652–1707). The Catholic marriage was legalized on 10 May 1673, and recognized by Emperor Leopold on 15 July 1673.
There was only one son from this marriage : Leopold (1674–1744). The couple divorced in 1680.

Frederick became Duke after his father's death in 1689. In 1675, he had acquired the renovated Wiesenburg Castle with the associated lands for 100,000 thalers, which he resold in 1723 to his only son for 110,000 thaler.
He died one year later.

== Sources ==
- DNB
- Museen Nord
