= Prince Karl Borromäus of Liechtenstein =

Austrian field marshal and courtier (1730–1789)

Karl Borromäus
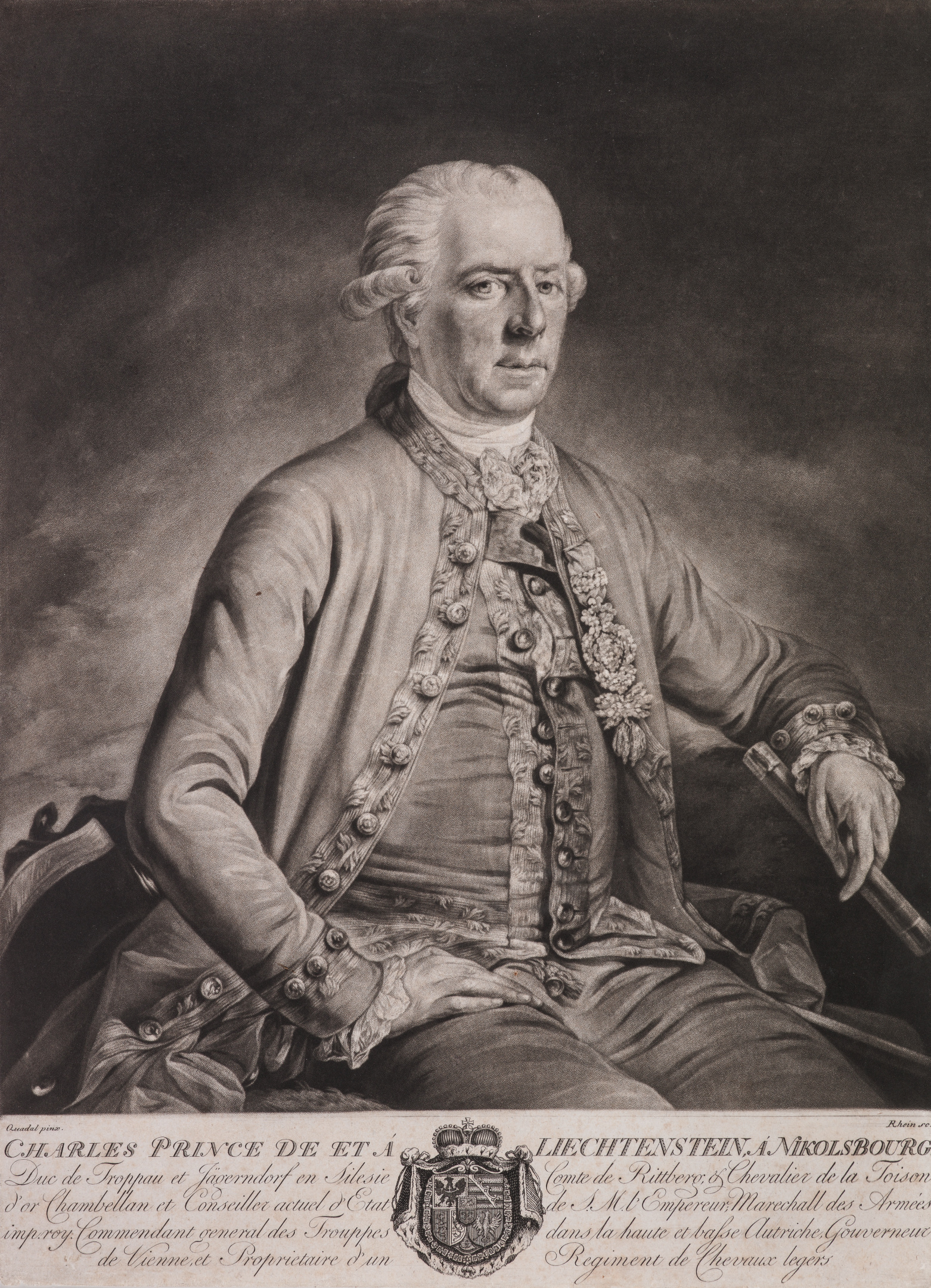
- Born: 29 September 1730; Vienna
- Died: 21 February 1789 (aged 58); Vienna
- Spouse: Princess Maria Eleonore of Oettingen-Spielberg (m. 1761)
- Issue: Princess Maria Josepha Eleonore Nicolaus; Prince Karl Joseph Emanuel Albinus; Prince Joseph Wenzel Franz Anastasius; Prince Emanuel Joseph Kaspar Melchior Balthasar; Prince Moritz Joseph Johann Baptist Viktor; Prince Franz de Paula Joseph Aloys Crispin; Prince Aloys Gonzaga Joseph Franz de Paula Theodor
Names
- Karl Borromäus Michael Joseph
- House: Liechtenstein
- Father: Emanuel, Prince of Liechtenstein
- Mother: Countess Maria Anna of Dietrichstein-Weichselstädt

Prince Karl (Karl Borromäus) Michael Joseph of Liechtenstein (29 September 1730 – 21 February 1789) was an Austrian field marshal and courtier, a member of the House of Liechtenstein.

He was the 805th Knight of the Order of the Golden Fleece in Austria in 1772.

== Life ==
Born in Vienna, the second son of Emanuel, Prince of Liechtenstein (1700–1771) and Maria Anna Antonia, Countess of Dietrichstein-Weichselstädt, Baroness of Hollenburg and Finkenstein, he was the younger brother of Franz Joseph I, Prince of Liechtenstein.

In his youth, Liechtenstein was commissioned into an Austrian cavalry regiment. In 1747 he served in a campaign in the Netherlands, part of the War of the Austrian Succession, and was promoted quickly, especially during the Seven Years' War, becoming a colonel in 1757, during which year he was seriously wounded near Reichenberg. He distinguished himself in the conquest of Schweidnitz and was among the first to enter the city. As a reward he was sent to Maria Theresa in Vienna with the news of the victory and was awarded the Order of the Golden Fleece. He became owner of the 1st Dragoon Regiment and commander of the garrison of Vienna.

In 1758, Liechtenstein was promoted to general and in 1760 to lieutenant field marshal. In 1765 he was Inspector General of the Cavalry, in 1771 was commanding general in Pressburg, and in 1775 held general command in Lower Austria.

During the War of the Bavarian Succession of 1778–1779 he was a cavalry general. At the beginning of the war, he commanded 28,000 men, who initially stood near Leitmeritz, blocking access to Bavaria. As the Austrian situation became more problematic, he carried out a series of successful manoevres.

Along with his wife, Liechtenstein was one of Joseph II's closest courtiers and rose to field marshal and chamberlain.

In a letter to his father dated 24 January 1782, Wolfgang Amadeus Mozart hoped to gain a commission from Prince Karl Boromäos to tutor his nephew, Prince Alois.

In the Russo-Turkish War, in 1788, he was given command of an army of 36,000 men in Croatia and took part in the siege of Dubitza. However, he fell seriously ill and was treated in the spa town of Petrinia, where his condition worsened. Returning home to Vienna, he died there in February 1788.

He was buried in the newly built mausoleum of the younger line of the House of Liechtenstein, at the Church of All Saints in Kromau.

== Family ==
On 30 March 1761, in Vienna, he married Maria Eleonore Prinzessin zu Oettingen-Oettingen und Oettingen-Spielberg (Oettingen, 7 July 1745 - Vienna, 26 November 1812).

They had seven children:

- Princess Maria Josepha Eleonore Nicolaus (born Vienna, 4 December 1763, died 23 September 1833), married in Vienna on 29 January 1782 Johann Nepomuck Graf von Harrach zu Rohrau und Thannhausen (1756–1829), without issue.
- Prince Karl Joseph Emanuel Albinus (born 2 March 1765, killed in duel in Vienna 24 December 1795), married in Vienna on 28 September 1789 Marianne Josepha Gräfin von Khevenhüller-Metsch (1770–1849), and had issue.
- Prince Joseph Wenzel Franz Anastasius (born 21 August 1767, died 30 July 1842), a Priest in Salzburg, and later a military figure.
- Prince Emanuel Joseph Kaspar Melchior Balthasar (born 6 January 1770, died 20 February 1773).
- Prince Moritz Joseph Johann Baptist Viktor (21 July 1775 - 24 March 1819), married in Eisenstadt on 13 April 1806 Marie Leopoldine Princess Esterházy of Galántha (1788–1846), and had issue:
- Prince Franz de Paula Joseph Aloys Crispin (born 26 October 1776, died in Brussels of wounds received in battle on 23 June, 27 June 1794), unmarried and without issue.
- Prince Aloys Gonzaga Joseph Franz de Paula Theodor (1 April 1780 - 4 November 1833), died in Prague unmarried and without issue.

== Ancestry ==
Ancestors of Prince Karl Borromäus of Liechtenstein

16. Gundakar, Prince of Liechtenstein
8. Prince Hartmann III of Liechtenstein
17. Countess Agnes of East Frisia
4. Prince Philipp Erasmus of Liechtenstein
18. Count Ernst Friedrich of Salm-Reifferscheidt
9. Countess Sidonie Elisabeth Salm-Reifferscheidt
19. Countess Maria Ursula of Leiningen-Dagsburg-Falkenburg
2. Prince Emanuel of Liechtenstein
20. Johann Theodor, Count Löwenstein-Wertheim-Rochefort
10. Ferdinand Charles, Count of Löwenstein-Wertheim-Rochefort
21. Countess Josephine von der Marck
5. Princess Christina of Löwenstein-Wertheim-Rochefort
22. Egon VII, Count and Landgrave of Furstenberg-Heiligenberg
11. Countess Anna Maria of Fürstenberg
23. Princess Anna Maria of Hohenzollern-Hechingen
1. Prince Karl Borromäus of Liechtenstein
24. Count Sigismund Ludwig of Dietrichstein-Hollenburg
12. Count Franz Adam of Dietrichstein-Hollenburg
25. Countess Anna Maria of Meggau
6. Count Karl Ludwig of Dietrichstein
26. Count Georg Christoph of Trauttmansdorff
13. Countess Maria Cecilia of Trauttmansdorff
27. Baroness Maria Rosalia of Rindsmaul
3. Countess Antonia of Dietrichstein-Weichselstädt
28. Count Maximilian of Trauttmansdorff-Gleichenberg
14. Count Georg Sigismund of Trauttmansdorff
29. Countess Mária Zsofia Pálffy of Erdöd
7. Countess Maria Theresa Anna of Trauttmansdorff
30. Count Johann Franz of Wildenstein
15. Countess Renata of Wildenstein
31. Baroness Barbara Constantia Scheidt of Leitersdorf
