= Gancarczyk =

Gancarczyk is a surname. Notable people with the surname include:

- Janusz Gancarczyk (born 1984), Polish footballer, brother of Marek
- Marek Gancarczyk (born 1983), Polish footballer
- Mariusz Gancarczyk (born 1988), Polish footballer
- Seweryn Gancarczyk (born 1981), Polish footballer
