= Oława =

Town in Lower Silesian Voivodeship, Poland

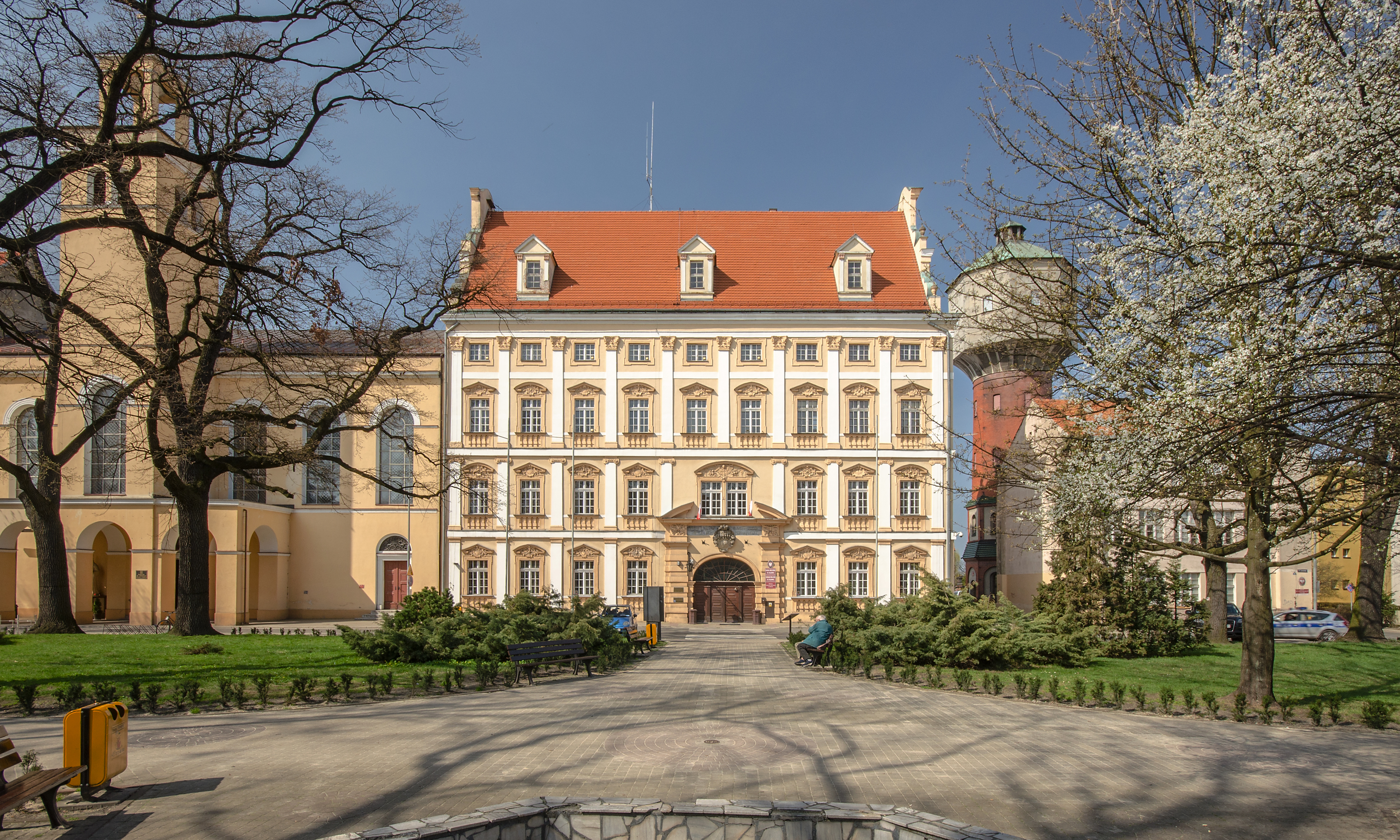
- Castle Square in Oława with the Sobieski Castle

- Flag Coat of arms

- Location within Poland
- Coordinates: 50°56′N 17°18′E
- Country: Poland
- Voivodeship: Lower Silesian
- County: Oława
- Gmina: Oława (urban gmina)
- Established: 11th or 12th century
- First mentioned: 1149
- Town rights: 1234

Government
  - Mayor: Tomasz Frischmann

Area
  - Total: 27.34 km^{2} (10.56 sq mi)
- Elevation: 122 m (400 ft)

Population (2019-06-30)
  - Total: 33,029
  - Density: 1,194.2/km^{2} (3,093/sq mi)
- Time zone: UTC+1 (CET)
  - Summer (DST): UTC+2 (CEST)
- Postal code: 55-200
- Car plates: DOA
- Website: http://www.um.olawa.pl

Oława (Polish pronunciation: [ɔˈwava]; German: Ohlau, [ˈoːlaʊ]) is a historic town in south-western Poland with 33,029 inhabitants (2019). It is situated in Lower Silesian Voivodeship, within the Wrocław metropolitan area. It is the seat of Oława County and of the smaller administrative district of Gmina Oława (although it is not part of the territory of the latter, as the town is an urban gmina in its own right).

== Etymology ==
The name of the city comes from the Polish word root el-, ol-, which in Polish lands took also the form of oła-, meaning "water". The association with water refers to the location of the settlement between two rivers: the Oder and the Oława, which are close to each other, but only connect in Wrocław, which is 27 km (17 mi) away. The location of the city between rivers, pools and forests, and at the same time in the place of crossing the Oder River, favored the creation of a market settlement of Ślęża, and later a stronghold, a town.

The locality was mentioned in the Old Polish, Latinized form of Oleva in a Latin document issued on August 12, 1201, by the chancellery of Pope Innocent III in Segni. In a document written in Latin by Henry I the Bearded from 1214, the city is mentioned under the name Olaua in the fragment Olauam et Odriczam. In a Latin document issued in Wrocław in 1269, signed by the Silesian duke Władysław of Wrocław, the town is mentioned under two names: Olawa oraz Olauia. In the Latin book Liber fundationis episcopatus Vratislaviensis (Polish Book of Emoluments of the Bishopric of Wrocław) written in the times of Bishop Henry of Wierzbno in the years 1295–1305, the town is mentioned in the Latinized form Olavia. The town was mentioned in a Latin document from 1310, where the town was recorded as "civitati Olavia versus Nyzam". In 1613, the Polish regionalist from the region of Silesia and historian Mikołaj Henel mentioned the town in his Latin work on the geography of Śląsk (also known by the Latinized as "Silesia"), entitled Silesiographia giving two names Olavia and Olawa/Olaw.

== History ==
Oława began to develop during the 11th or early 12th century at a site that was protected by the rivers Oder and Oława, when it was part of the Piast-ruled Kingdom of Poland. It was first mentioned as Oloua in a document of 1149 confirming Piotr Włostowic's donation to the abbey of St. Vincent in Wrocław. In 1206 Oława became one of the residential towns of the dukes of the Silesian branch of the Piast dynasty, who also granted Oława the status of a town in 1234. As a result of the fragmentation of Poland, Oława at various times formed part of the duchies of Silesia, Legnica and Brzeg.

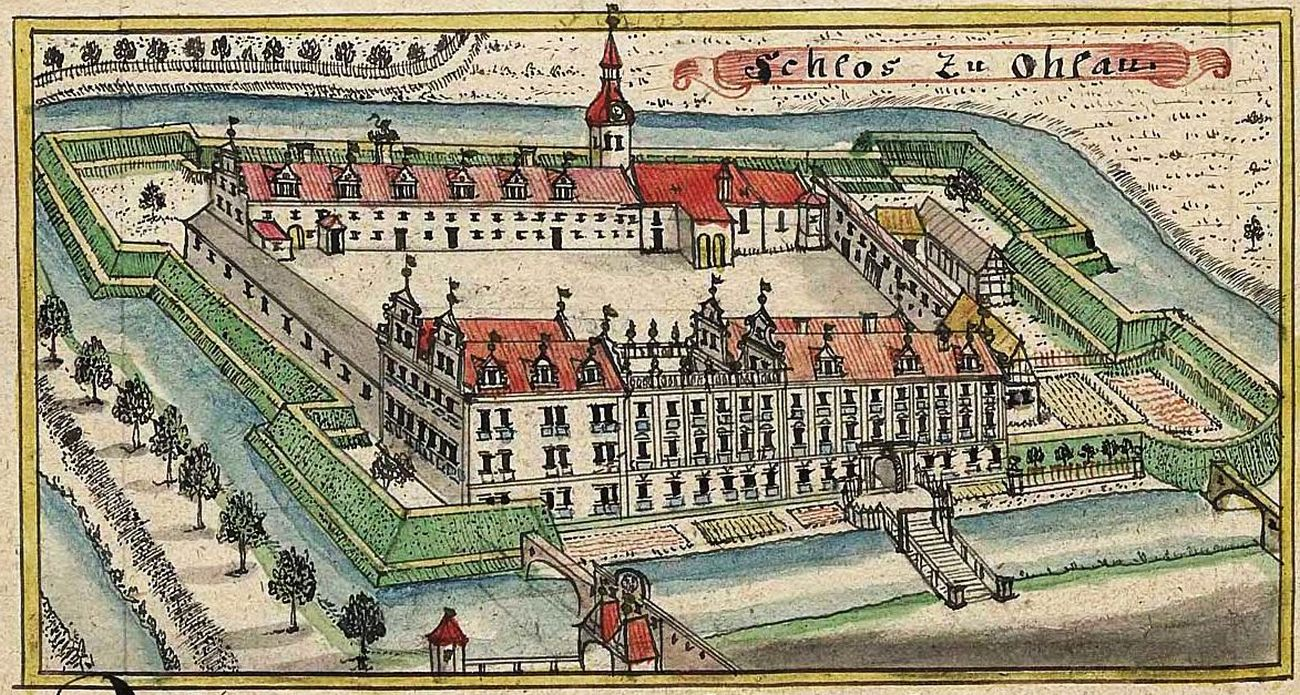
The Sobieski Castle in the 18th century

During its history Oława was destroyed completely three times. In 1241 it was destroyed during the first Mongol invasion of Poland, in 1448 by the Hussites, and again in 1634 during the Thirty Years' War. After the Polish King Casimir III had renounced his rights on Silesia with the Treaty of Trenčín in 1335, Silesia became until 1806 a part of the Bohemian Crown, although the town remained under the rule of the Polish Piast dynasty as part of the Duchy of Legnica until 1675. In 1526, when the Habsburgs gained the Bohemian crown, Silesia came under Austrian suzerainty. In 1527 with the Reformation High German language came in use and with it the first usage of the version of the town's name Ohlau is reported. Following the death of the last Silesian Piast duke George IV William of Legnica in 1675, Oława ceased to be a residence town. In spite of Habsburg political influence, in the 17th century, the town was still part of the territory dominated by the Polish language. Oława found itself again under Polish rule, when Polish prince James Louis Sobieski, son of King John III Sobieski, became duke of Oława in years 1691–1737. Together with most of Silesia, the town became part of the Kingdom of Prussia in 1742.

The 18th and 19th centuries were a period of economic growth and Oława (then as Ohlau) became well known as a centre of tobacco-growing. In 1842 a railroad between Ohlau and Wrocław, the first in Silesia, was opened. Ethnic Polish traditions and population remained strong in the area. Poles smuggled large amounts of gunpowder through the town to the Russian Partition of Poland during the January Uprising in 1863. Folkorist Julius Roger noted local Polish folk songs in his 1863 work, and a substantial concentration of Poles in and around the town was still noted in 1896.

=== 20th century ===
The historic town of Ohlau did not suffer any damage during World War I, however, in World War II about 60% of the buildings were destroyed. On 2 September 1939, a Polish PZL.23 Karaś bomber (scout) plane bombed a German factory in the city in the first attack on German territory after the German invasion of Poland and the outbreak of World War II the day before. During the war, the Germans established and operated two labour subcamps of the Stalag VIII-B/344 prisoner-of-war camp in the town. At least five Polish resistance members were sentenced to death in the city by a German court in 1942. After Nazi Germany's defeat in the war, the town became again part of Poland.

After the war, a sizeable group of Polish Armenians displaced from Soviet-annexed eastern Poland settled in the town, and the first post-war mayor was Polish-Armenian Jakub Axentowicz. Oława also became a garrison town of the Soviet Red Army Northern Group of Forces and remained so until 1992.

From 1975 to 1998, it was administratively located in the Wrocław Voivodeship.

== Flag and coat of arms ==
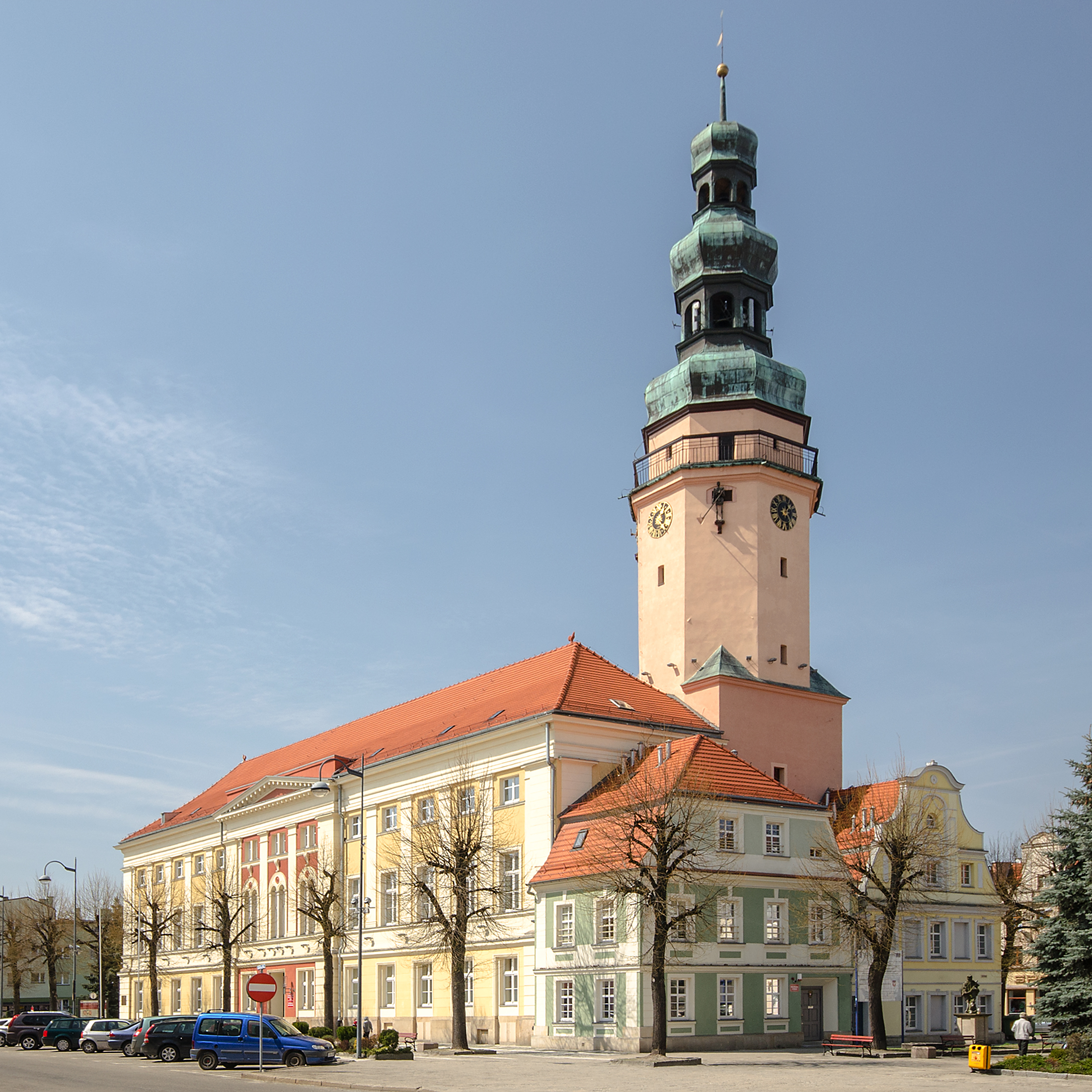
Town hall in Oława

The flag of Oława presents the coat of arms of Oława, on a diagonally divided white-red background.

The coat of arms presents a white rooster on a red-shield background, looking to the left. There are two traditional hypotheses for the origin of the coat of arms:

1. The symbol links in with Walloonian weavers; historically located in Oława's land - and the coat of arms of Wallonia - a red rooster on a yellow background.
2. The shield originates from the town coat of arms of the Czech knight family of Olav.

Neither hypothesis explains the look of the coat of arms in relation to Oława. The coat of arms of Oława is identical on the basis and content of the Kur coat of arms.

On the basis that the coat of arms of Oława is in relation to the Kur coat of arms, such hypothesis can be deemed highly agreeable. The Kur coat of arms can be linked to Jan of Kur, a knight of Konrad I of Głogów, being the owner of the village of Kurów Wielki in 1266, in the Polkowice County. The coat of arms can also be also traced back to the personage of Szyban von Der - the court adjudicator of Henry III of Głogów - erroneously equated to Szaban Tader, a castellan of the Świny Castle, mentioned in Franciszek Piekosiński's book - Heraldyka polska wieków średnich - (Heraldry of Polish Middle Ages) published in Kraków, in 1899; where the document is sealed with the town's coat of arms from 1300.

== Economy ==
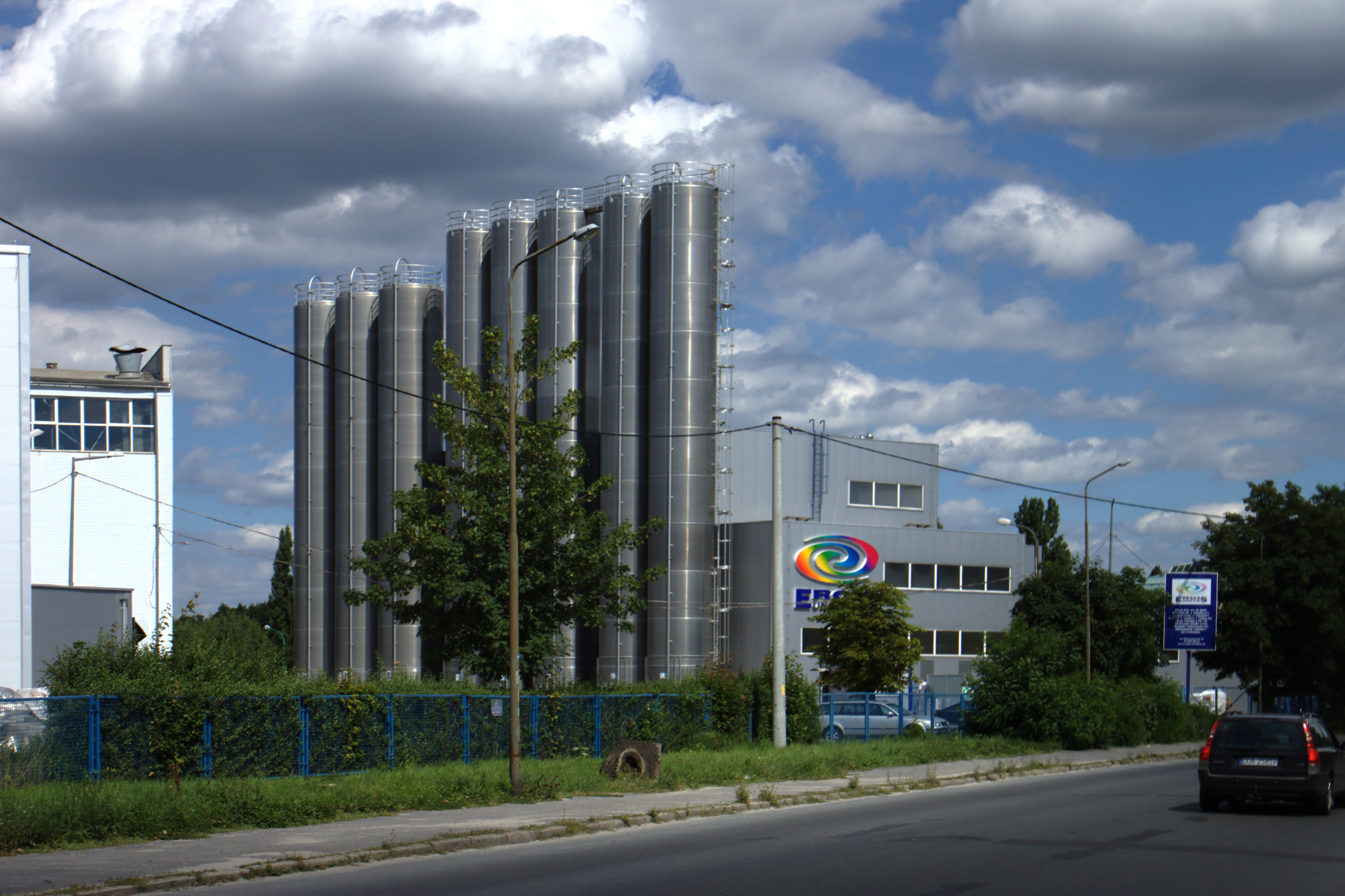
Ergis S.A.

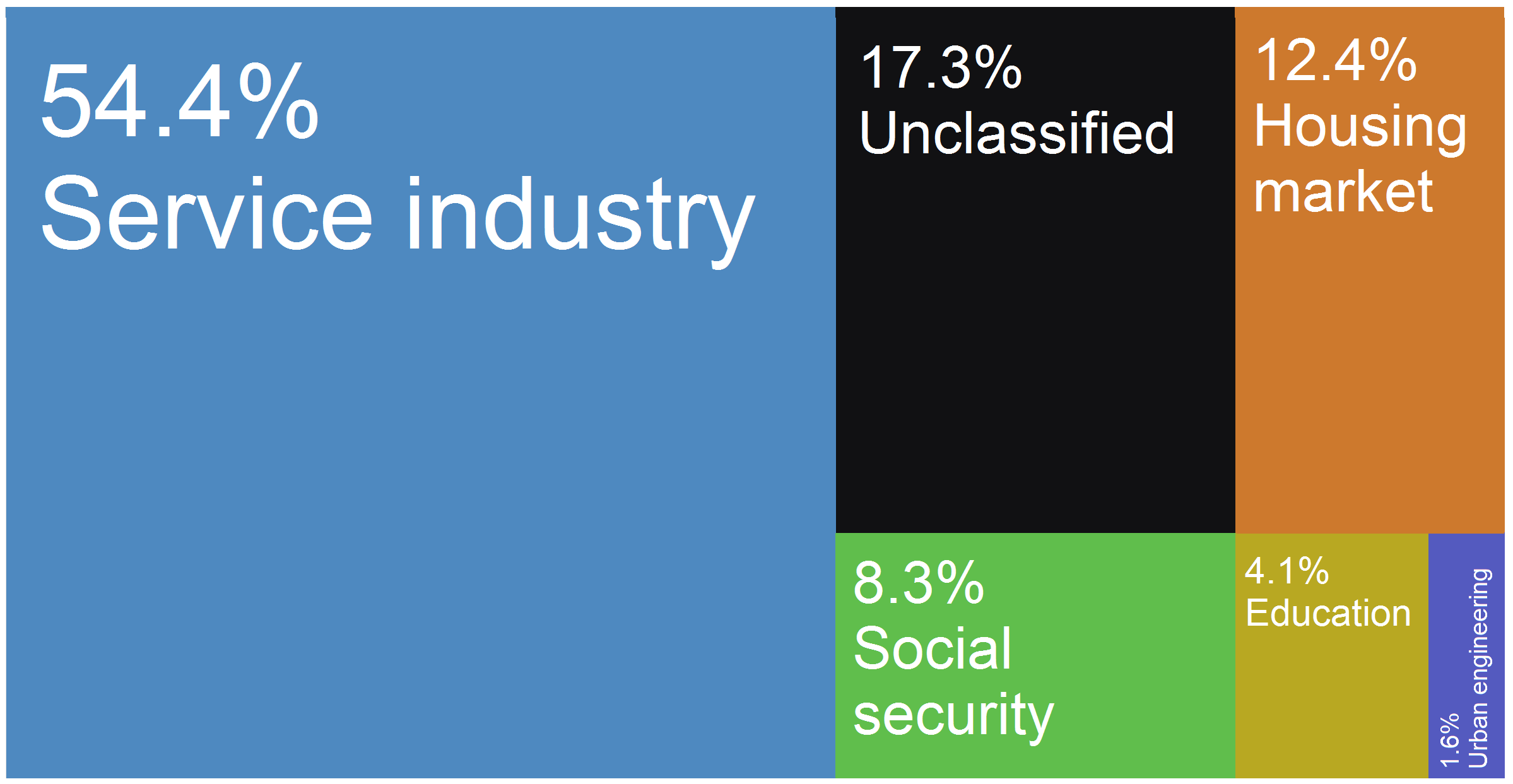
Oława city budget income sources as of 2015.

Oława is the centre for industry and production in the Oława County. The town's industries include the production of electronics (namely Electrolux Poland and Nardi Appliances), furniture and car parts.

Largest industries include:

- Zm Silesia SA (formerly Huta Oława S.A.) – production of zinc oxide, lead oxide and cadmium oxide
- SCA Hygiene Products – production of nappies for toddlers and adults
- DS Smith – packaging production
- Autoliv Poland – production of seat belts and car airbags
- Centrozłom Wrocław PPZM – branch of metal recycling
- The Lorenz Bahlsen Snack-World Sp. z o.o. – food production
- Ergis SA – packaging production
- MetalErg – processing of metals and plastics
- Tabex – car parts production
- ZNTK Oława Sp. z o.o. – train repair department
- Zakpol – architrave production
- Marco – plastic materials production
- Formtech – plastic materials production
- Rotex – plastic materials production
- Atex Sp. z o.o. – muffler and petrol tank production
- Electrolux Poland – electronics
- Nardi Appliances Poland – electronics
- Standis Polska Sp. z o.o. - shop furniture production
- Bama Europa Sp. z o.o. - confectionery production

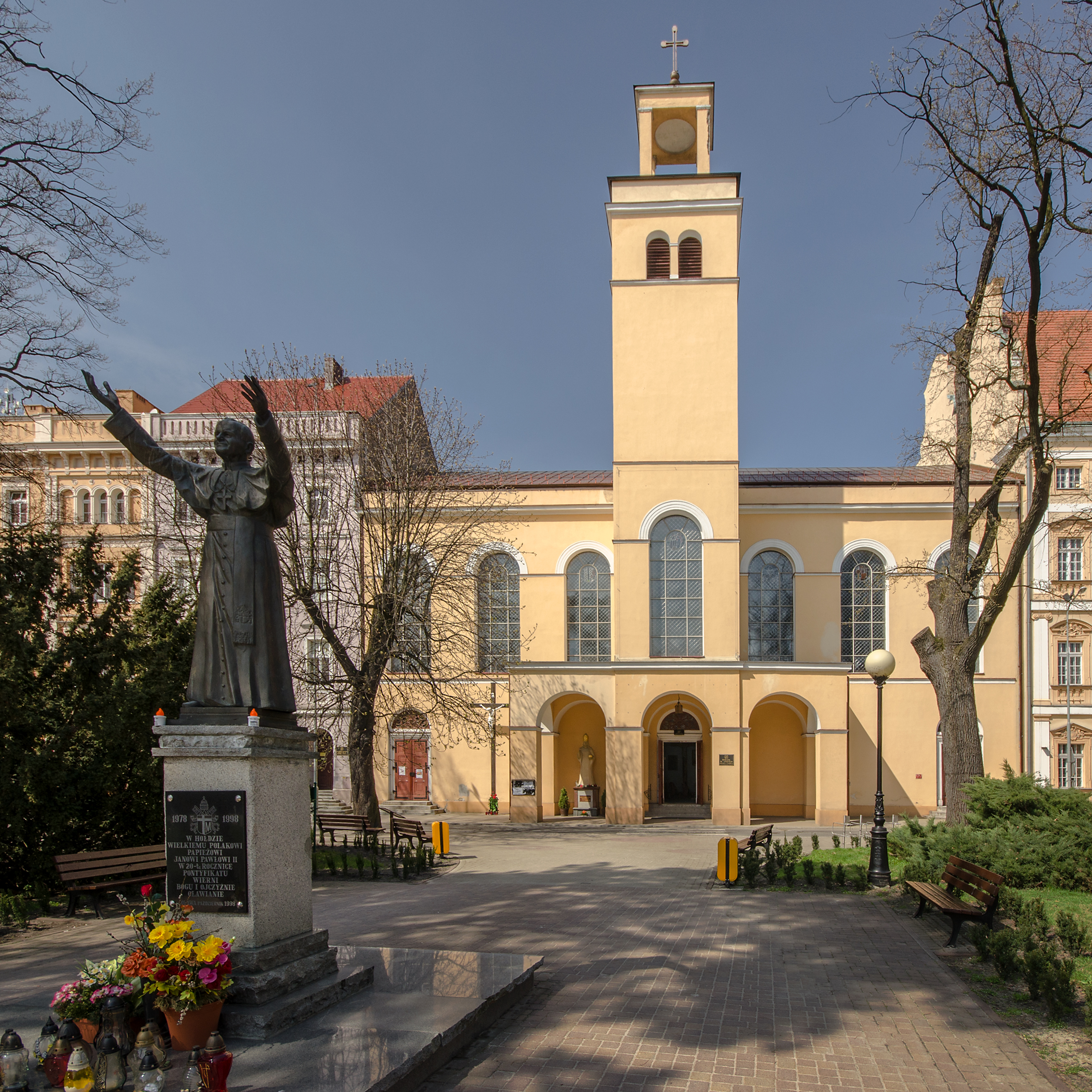
Saints Peter and Paul church and monument of Pope John Paul II

== Sports ==
The local football team is Moto Jelcz Oława. It competes in the lower leagues.

== Notable people ==
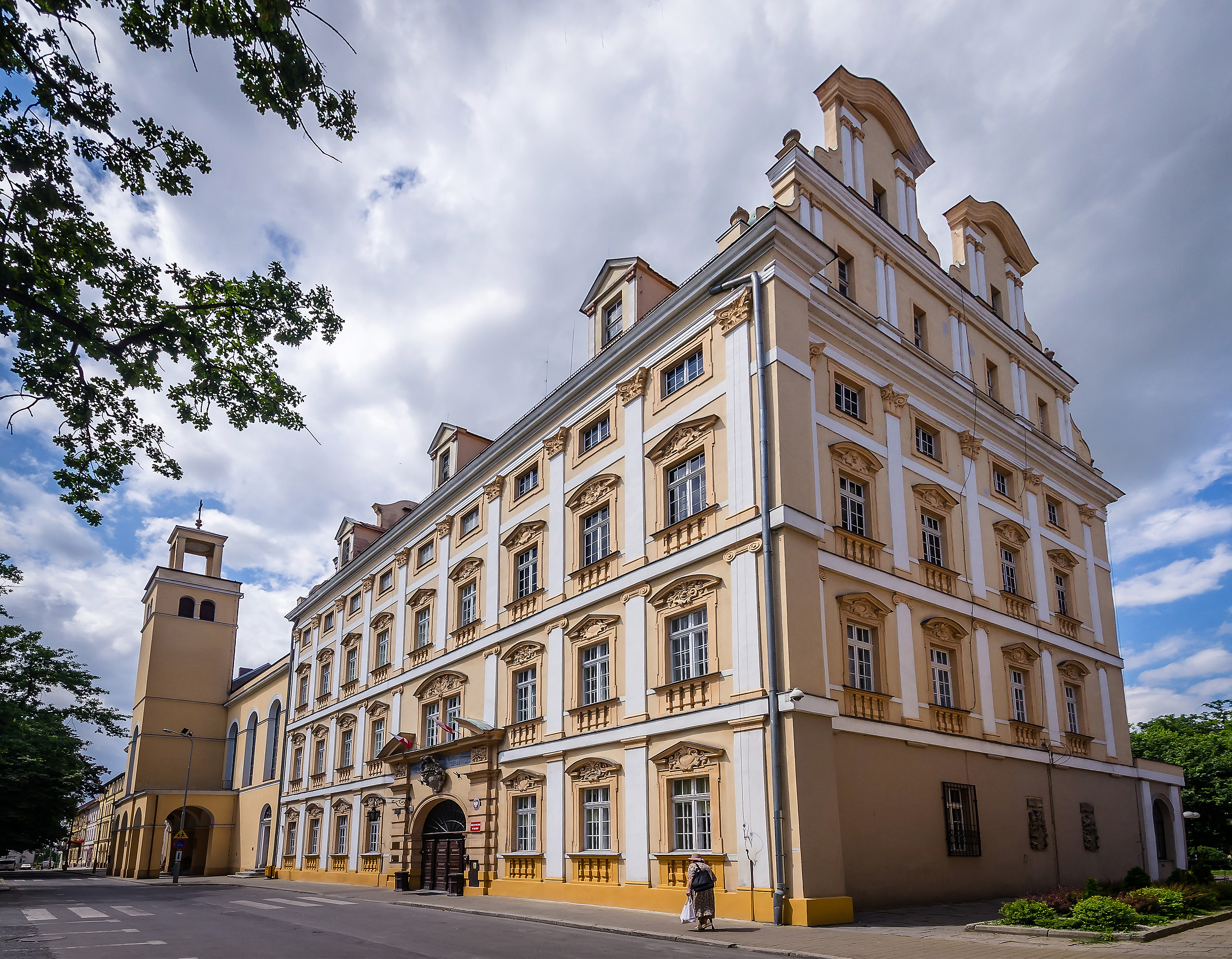
The Oława Castle was the residence of local Piast and Sobieski dukes

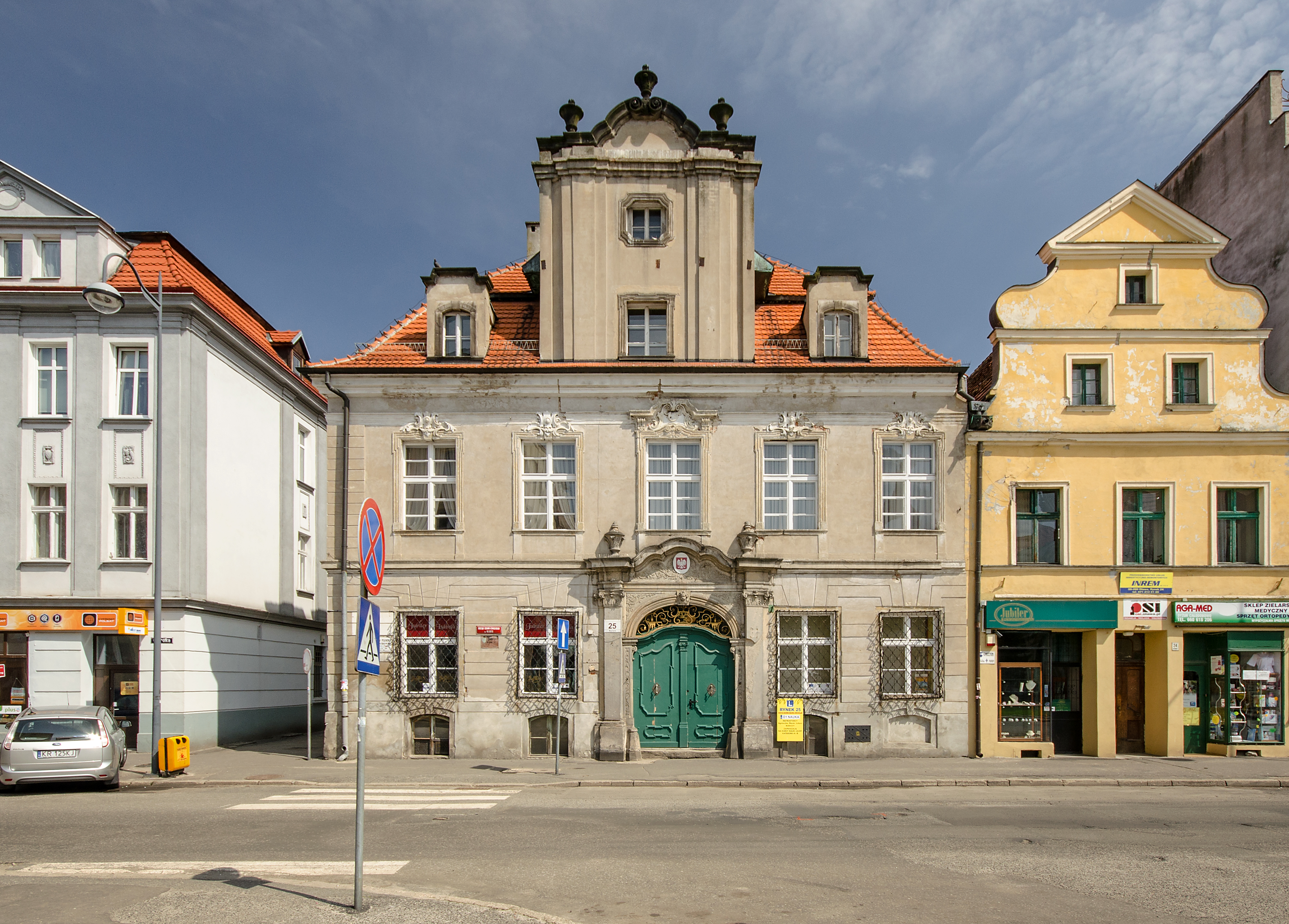
Registry office

- John Christian of Brzeg-Legnica (1591–1639), Duke of Brzeg and Legnica, member of the Piast dynasty
- George Rudolf of Legnica (1595–1653), Duke of Legnica, member of the Piast dynasty
- Christian of Brzeg-Legnica (1618–1672), Duke of Brzeg and Legnica, member of the Piast dynasty, candidate for the Polish throne
- George IV William of Legnica (1660–1675), Duke of Legnica, last ruling member of the Piast dynasty
- Maria Karolina Sobieska (1697–1740), Polish noblewoman, duchesse de Bouillon, daughter of James Louis Sobieski
- Maria Clementina Sobieska (1702–1735), Polish noblewoman, wife of the Jacobite pretender James Francis Edward Stuart, sister of the above
- Johann Baptist Alzog (1808–1878), German theologian and Catholic church historian.
- Alfred Pringsheim (1850–1941), German mathematician and patron of the arts
- Hermann Eberhard (1852–1908), German explorer
- Bernhard Lichtenberg (1875–1943), German Roman Catholic priest and theologian, awarded the title righteous among the Nations.
- Leopold Lichtwitz (1876–1943), German-American internist
- Hans-Georg von der Marwitz (1893–1925), German World War I flying ace
- Bernd Eistert, (1902–1978) German chemist
- Peter Yorck von Wartenburg, (1904–1944) German jurist and a member of the German Resistance against Nazism
- Hans Kloss (1938–2018), German artist and graphic designer
- Marek Wrona (born 1966), Polish racing cyclist, Tour de Pologne winner
- Adam Wójcik (1970–2017), Polish basketball player, 8-time Polish champion
- Paweł Mykietyn (born 1971), Polish composer
- Szymon Kołecki (born 1981), Polish weightlifter who won the gold medal at the 2008 Olympic Games in Beijing after doping reanalysis
- Marek Gancarczyk (born 1983), Polish footballer
- Janusz Gancarczyk (born 1984), Polish footballer
- Maciej Bodnar (born 1985), Polish professional cyclist
- Mateusz Rudyk (born 1995), Polish track cyclist

== Twin towns – sister cities ==
Oława is twinned with:

- Česká Třebová, Czech Republic
- Oberasbach, Germany
- Priolo Gargallo, Italy
- Sighetu Marmației, Romania
- Zolochiv, Ukraine

== See also ==
- PZL.23 Karas
