= Beatrice of Swabia (died 1174) =

German princess, daughter of Holy Roman Emperor Frederick Barbarossa

Beatrice of Swabia (1162/3–1174), also spelled Beatrix, was a princess of the Staufer dynasty, a daughter of Emperor Frederick Barbarossa and Countess Beatrice I of Burgundy. She was born in 1162 or 1163, the first child of her parents. She was named after her mother as her eldest brother, Frederick, was named after her father.

== Marriage negotiations ==
In 1173, Barbarossa sought to arrange her marriage to Philip, son of King Louis VII of France. Louis's brother, Archbishop Henry of Reims, and the apostolic legate, Archbishop William of Sens, intervened on behalf of Pope Alexander III to scotch the negotiations, since at the time Barbarossa recognized a rival pope in Callixtus III. These negotiations are known from Alexander's letter to Henry, dated 6 September 1173.

During the siege of Ancona later the same year (April–October 1173), Archbishop Christian I of Mainz on his sovereign's behalf, proposed Beatrice's marriage to the young King William II of Sicily. According to Romuald of Salerno, William rejected the proposal because he did not wish to offend Alexander III.

In late 1173, rumours swirled in Germany that Saladin, the sultan of Egypt, had proposed that his son marry Beatrice, in return for which he would convert to Christianity and release all Christian prisoners in Egypt. Christian of Mainz, on the emperor's behalf, had sent an ambassador to Saladin in 1172 seeking an alliance. In response, an envoy from Saladin arrived in Germany in October 1173. The rumours of a proposed marriage between the sultan's son and a daughter of Frederick are reported in the Chronica regia Coloniensis. If the topic of a marriage alliance involving Beatrice and a son of Saladin was actually broached, the proposal was not taken up. A version of this story is also recorded by Otto of Sankt Blasien, who places it in 1179 and attributes the marriage project to the sultan of Iconium, Kilij Arslan II. This may be connected to the letter that Pope Alexander III sent to Kilij Arslan that year regarding the latter's expressed interest in converting to Christianity. According to Otto, Frederick agreed to the marriage, but Beatrice died before it could take place.

According to some writers, Beatrice was married in 1173 to Count William III of Chalon. Their daughter, Beatrice, was born in 1174 and inherited the County of Chalon in 1202.

== Death and legacy ==
According to Romuald of Salerno, Beatrice died not long after the proposed marriage to William II fell through. She was certainly dead before Romuald, who died in April 1181. She is generally thought to have died in 1174. She was buried in Lorch Abbey, alongside her brothers Rainald and William, who also died young. There she is mentioned in the verse epitaph of the Staufers, as recorded in the 15th-century Hystoria Friderici imperatoris magni. Her burial in Germany implies that she died before her father's fifth Italian campaign, and thus early in 1174.

The flurry of marriage negotiations involving Beatrice in 1173 may have left a small mark on contemporary fiction. In Chrétien de Troyes's Cligès, the emperor of Germany's daughter, named Fénice, is a major storyline. In the anonymous Partonopeus de Blois, the Persian sultan Margaris pursues the love interest of a princess, which may reflect Saladin's rumoured proposal.

== Bibliography ==
- Assmann, Erwin (1977). "Friedrich Barbarossas Kinder". Deutsches Archiv für Erforschung des Mittelalters. 33: 435–472.
- Demouy, Patrick (1998). "Henri de France et Louis VII: l'évêque cistercien et son frère le roi". Actes des congrès de la Société des historiens médiévistes de l'enseignement supérieur public. 29: 47–61.
- Eldevik, John (2024). Reading Prester John: Cultural Fantasy and its Manuscript Contexts. ARC Humanities Press.
- Fourrier, Anthime (1950). "Encore la chronologie des oeuvres de Chrétien de Troyes". Bulletin bibliographique de la Société Internationale Arthurienne. 2: 69–88.
- Fourrier, Anthime (1960). Le courant réaliste dans le roman en France au moyen âge. Vol. 1: Les débuts (XII^{e} siècle). A. G. Nizet.
- Freed, John B. (2016). Frederick Barbarossa: The Prince and the Myth. Yale University Press.
- Fröhlich, Walter (1992). "The Marriage of Henry VI and Constance of Sicily: Prelude and Consequences". Anglo-Norman Studies. 15: 99–115.
- Kinkade, Richard P. (2004). "Beatrice 'Contesson' of Savoy (c. 1250–1290): The Mother of Juan Manuel" (PDF). La corónica: A Journal of Medieval Hispanic Languages, Literatures, and Cultures. 32 (3): 163–225.
- Kinkade, Richard P. (2020). Dawn of a Dynasty: The Life and Times of Infante Manuel of Castile. University of Toronto Press.
- Loud, Graham A. (2025). Frederick Barbarossa. Reaktion Books.
- Mercan, F. Özden (2017). "Constructing a Self-Image in the Image of the Other: Pope Pius II's Letter to Sultan Mehmed II". In Marianna D. Birnbaum; Marcell Sebők (eds.). Practices of Coexistence: Constructions of the Other in Early Modern Perceptions. Central European University Press. pp. 71–102.
- Nickolaus, Keith (2002). Marriage Fictions in Old French Secular Narratives, 1170–1250: A Critical Re-evaluation of the Coutly Love Debate. Routledge.
- Phillips, Jonathan (2019). The Life and Legend of the Sultan Saladin. Yale University Press.
- Quarré de Verneuil, A.-H.-R. (1876). Le comté de Chalon, le Charollais et la ville de Paray-le-Monial: Étude historique. Émile Protat.
- Robinson, Ian S. (1990). The Papacy, 1073–1198: Continuity and Innovation. Cambridge University Press.
- Sulovsky, Vedran (2024). Making the Holy Roman Empire Holy: Frederick Barbarossa, Saint Charlemagne and the sacrum imperium. Cambridge University Press.
