= Oława Castle =

Sobieski's Castle in Oława
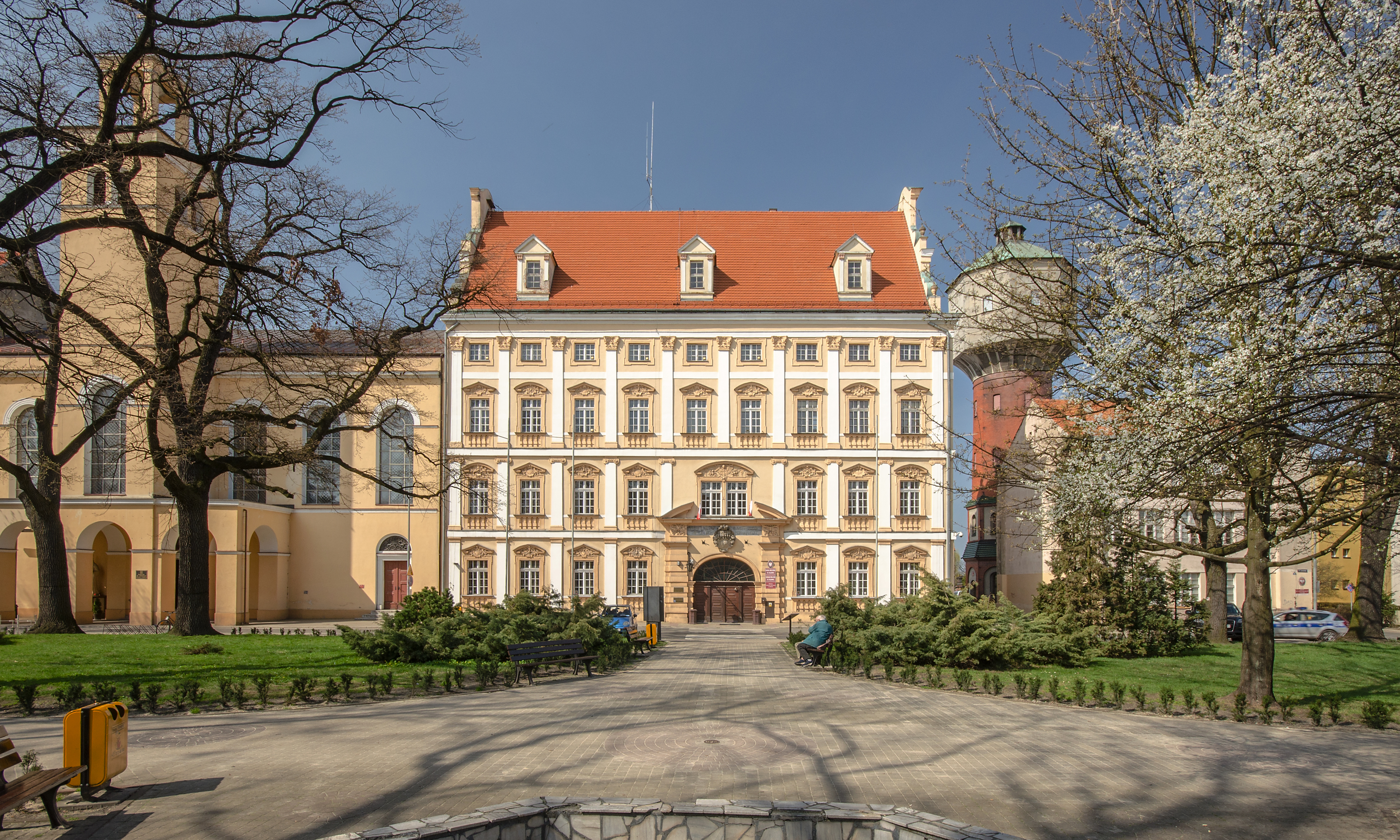
- Sobieski's Castle in Oława

- Location of the Sobieski's Castle in Oława in Poland Oława Castle (Lower Silesian Voivodeship)
- 50°56′39″N 17°17′40″E
- Location: Oława, Lower Silesian Voivodeship, in Poland

History
- Built: 1541

Site notes
- Architect(s): Carlo Rossi; Bernard Niuron, Jakub of Milan and/or his son Franciscus Pahr
- Architectural styles: Renaissance, Baroque

Sobieski's Castle in Oława is a Renaissance-Baroque style castle located in the site of a former Gothic castle. The original castle had been built by Duke Ludwik I built in the second half of the fourteenth century. It was the third castle structure in Oława, the first being the seat of the castellans, located in the south-east of the town. It remained an integral part of the town's defenses until the wars with the Hussites.

== Construction ==
The Renaissance castle was built by master Jakub of Milan (most likely with the surname Pahr, builder of the Bolków Castle), continued by his brother-in-law Bernard Niuron in 1588. After various reconstructions, this part of the castle now houses the local parish church's rectory of St. Apostle Peter and Paul. The reconstruction covered the whole of the Gothic castle, this included the now former west and northern wings of the castle-church. The castle-church's tower, the last fragment of the northern wing, collapsed in the later years of 1970s.

The current castle-church also has a two-level pavilion constructed in the early-Baroque architectural style, built onto the western side of the Renaissance castle. The pavilion was constructed by Italian masters during the reign of Christian, Duke of Brieg (1618–1672); the castle's building is called Christianbau. It was probably designed and built by Carlo Rossi, an Italian architect who spent most of his career in Russia and Poland. The site included a terraced garden which was incompatible with the Polish climate, causing in its rapid devastation.

== Owners and inhabitants ==
The castle was part of the defenses used by the House of Piast to protect their lands from incursion by their various enemies; their royal rule in Poland ended in 1370, but the family continued to dominate the areas bordering on Bohemia and Moravia. In the 17th century, the last duke, Christian, left the castle to his widow, Louise of Anhalt-Dessau, as her dower house; she was also the regent for her son, Georg William until his death of smallpox in 1675; the boy was the last male Piast. She remained at the castle until her own death in 1680, after which the Holy Roman Emperor Joseph I confiscated the Piast lands and castles.

During the reign of James Louis Sobieski, Oława Castle received new interior furnishings and the library was enlarged. After the prince left Oława in 1734, the structure began to decline. The Prussians subsequently located a hospital and a bakery in the castle.

== See also ==
- Castles in Poland
