= Lorch Abbey =

Benedictine abbey in Baden-Württemberg, Germany

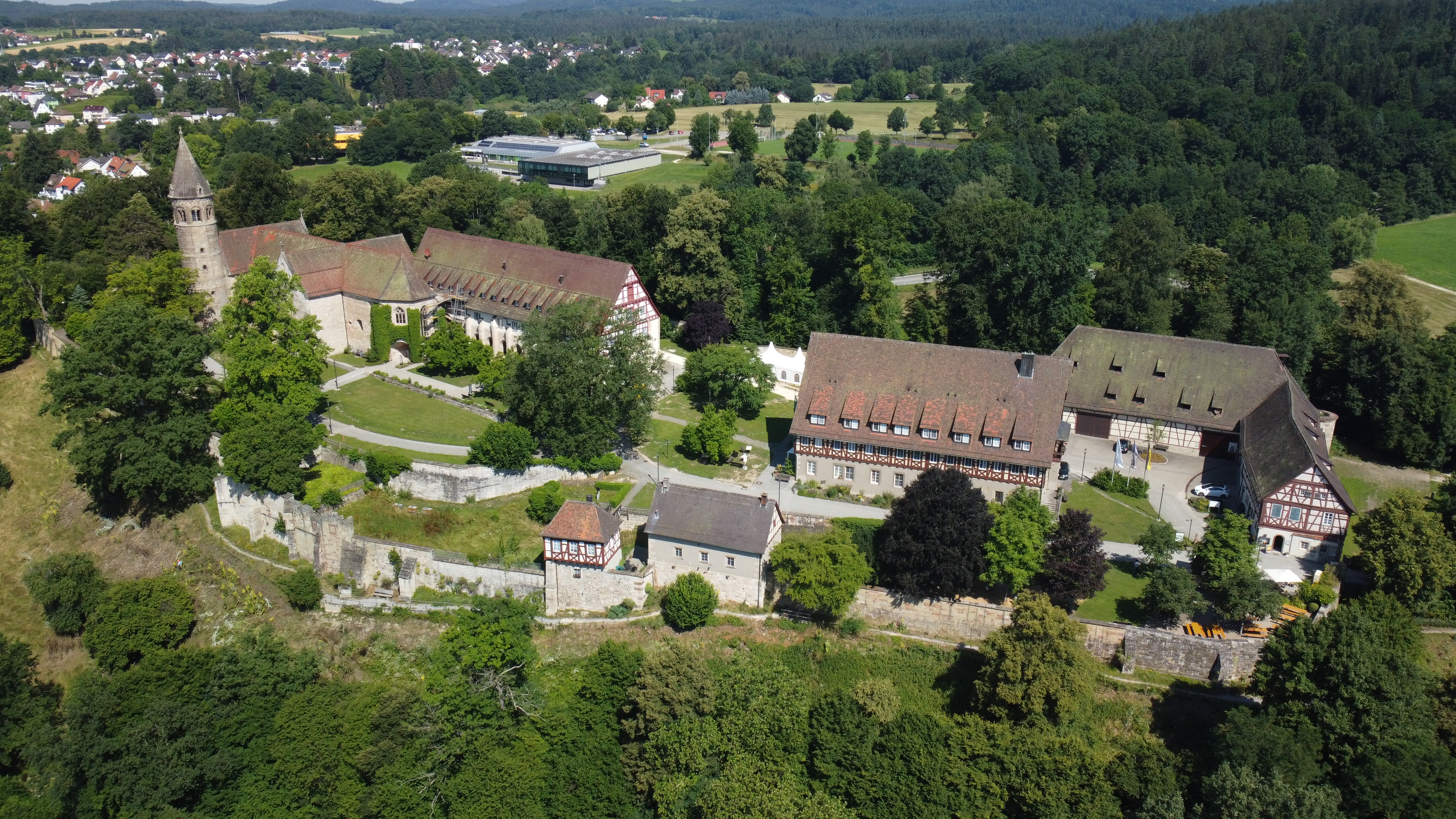
Lorch today

Lorch Abbey (German: Kloster Lorch) was a Benedictine monastery in Lorch from 1102 to 1556 and again from 1630 to 1648. It was originally the house monastery of the Staufer dynasty. Today, many of its buildings remain and are open to visitors.

== History ==
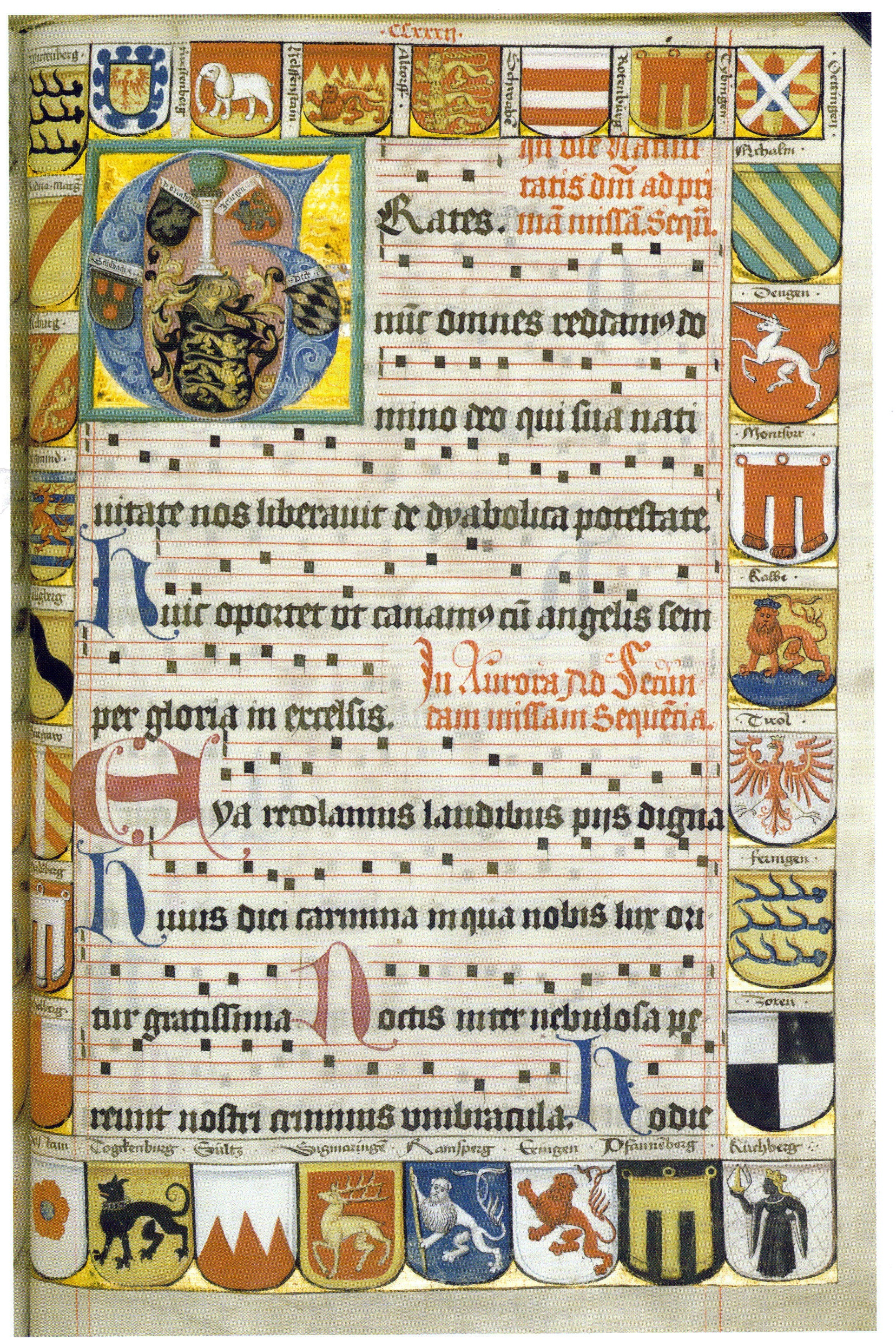
A page from one of the illuminated Lorch choir books

Lorch was founded in 1102 by Duke Frederick I of Swabia; his wife, Agnes of Waiblingen; and their sons, the future Duke Frederick II and King Conrad III. Its original buildings were completed by 1108 atop the Liebfrauenberg (Mountain of the Virgin). It lay on allodial property a few miles north of Hohenstaufen Castle on the other side of the river Rems. It at first served as a private church of the Staufer dynasty. In 1136, it was donated to the papacy and accepted by Pope Innocent II.

In 1139, Duke Frederick II was elected advocatus by the monks. He was then appointed by his brother, King Conrad III, who ruled that the head of the dynasty would thenceforth always be elected advocatus. In 1154, Frederick II's son, Emperor Frederick Barbarossa, clarified that it was the eldest descendant of Frederick II and Conrad III who would always be advocatus. It was probably around 1139 that Conrad III moved Frederick I's remains to the abbey for reburial. Many members of the Staufer family were buried at Lorch after 1140. The exact number and identity of burials is unknown. Conrad III desired to be buried there but was not.

After the death of Conradin in 1268, Lorch was acquired by the County of Württemberg. From the 13th century, the lords of Woellwarth endowed a chapel olding a purported relic of the skull of Saint Maurice. As a result, in the 15th and 16th centuries, they had the right to be buried in the chapel. In 1475, Abbot Nikolaus Schenk von Arberg opened the Staufer tombs and gathered the bones into a single new richly carved sarcophagus and placed it in the nave.

In the early 16th century, Lorch produced five illuminated choirbooks. The work was financed by Ulrich, Duke of Württemberg, and his wife, Sabina of Bavaria. Only three of the Lorch choir books still survive today. They indicate that Lorch was part of the Melk Reform.

Lorch was damaged on 26 April 1525 during the German Peasants' War. The damage was never repaired. The monastery was closed during the Reformation in 1556. During the Thirty Years' War, it was briefly restored as a Catholic house under the Abbey of Saint Blaise in 1630. It was closed again with the Peace of Westphalia in 1648.

Plans to demolish the remains of the monastery were halted in the late 19th century, when it came to be seen as a monument to the Staufer. Today, it is operated by Baden-Württemberg's State Palaces and Gardens and is open to visitors.

== Buildings ==
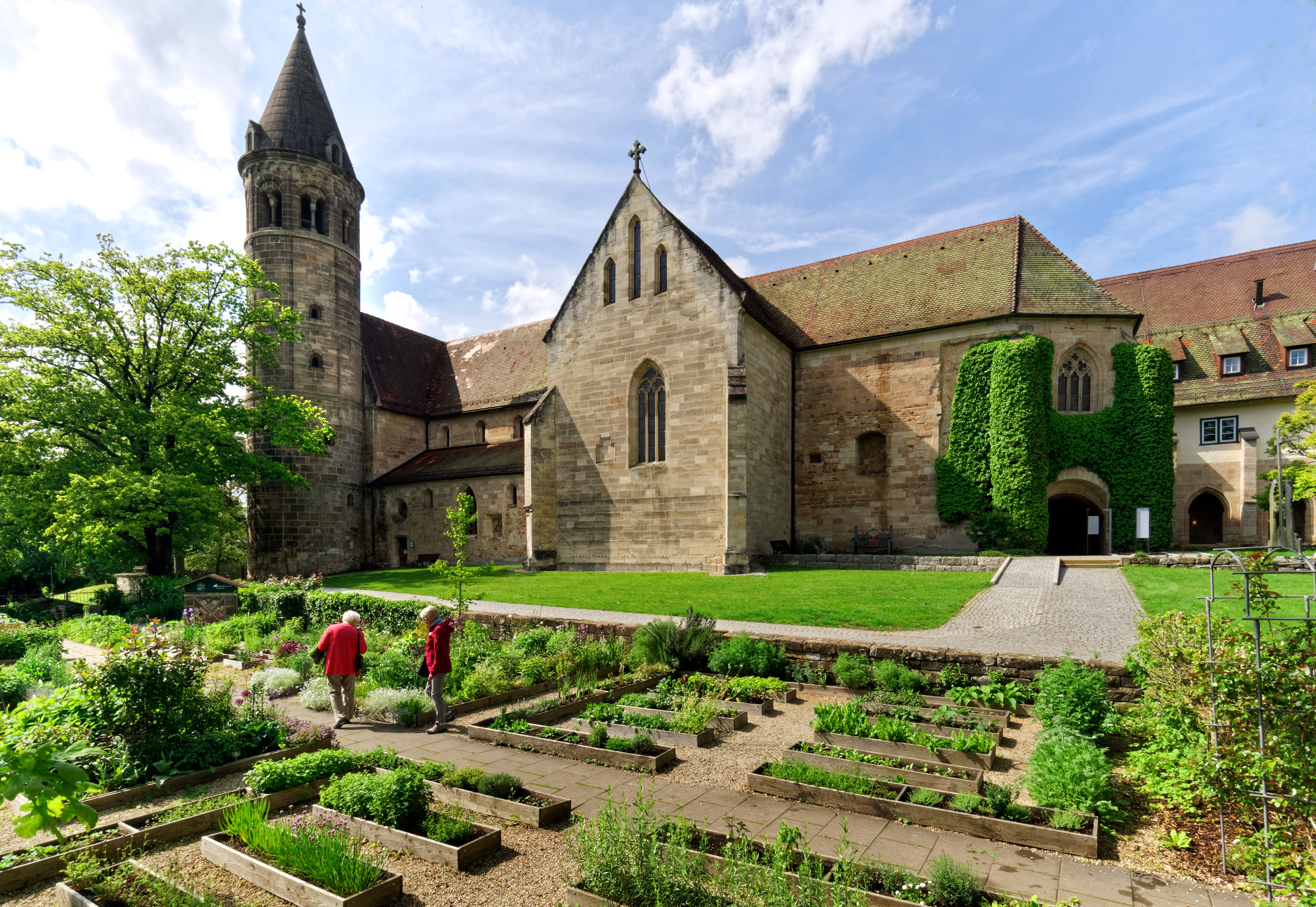
View of the church from the garden

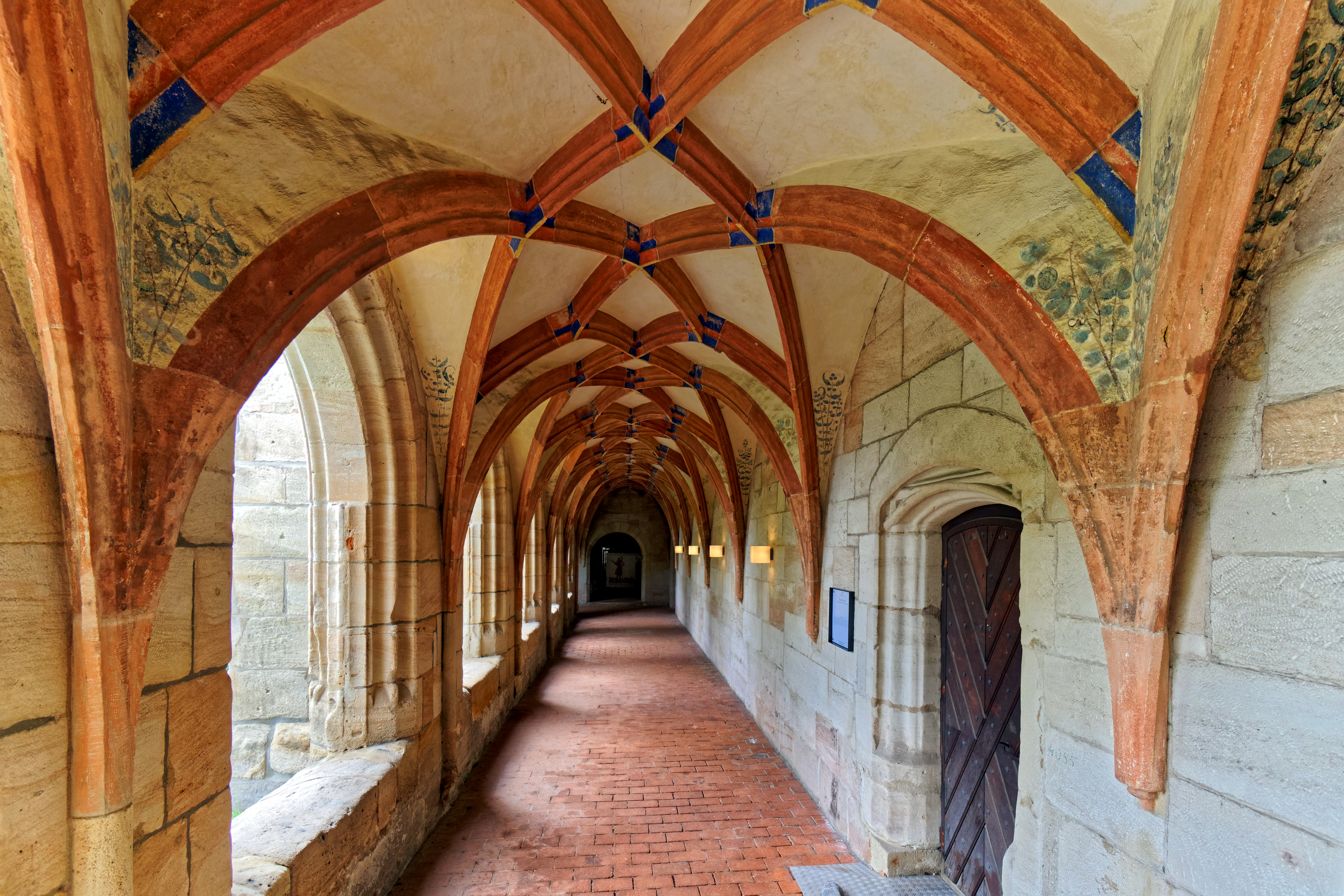
Arcade of the cloister

Lorch was a fortified monastery, surrounded by a rampart and stone wall with round towers. The wall as it still stands was built in the 13th century to expand the area of the monastery. It was renovated in the early 16th century. The eastern gate once had a tower, gatehouses and a moat with a drawbridge. The buildings were originally built in the Romanesque style.

The largest building was the cruciform church, which mostly still stands. Its altar was dedicated to Saint Peter in 1139. It had two round towers on its west façade. Only the Marsilius tower remains, although its upper storeys and stone roof are 19th-century restorations.

Originally Romanesque, the church received a Gothic renovation in 1469 under Abbot Nikolaus Schenk von Arberg. Tracery windows were added. Around 1500, the church had twelve altars. Once richly decorated, its decor has now been totally removed. This includes once sizeable relic collection. The eight piers of the nave are decorated with paintings of the Staufer kings from around 1500. The last of the church's furnishings, such as choir stalls, were taken out in 1833–1838, leaving an empty interior. The Romanesque reliefs decorating the capitals in the nave was retouched in the 19th century.

The monks' residence, the cloister, was attached to the church. Only its north wing survives, the rest a victim of the Peasants' War. It is now known as the "prelature" and includes the former dormitory, chapter house and refectory. There are murals of the life of Christ from about 1530 in the refectory. A modern mural depicting the sweep of Staufer history was added by Hans Kloss to the chapter house. The half-timber abbot's house, a separate building which also served as a guesthouse, still stands. The bailiwick, the residence of the steward and later used by the dukes of Württemberg during hunting trips, has been torn down.

The monastery's outbuildings included a hospital, school, cavalier house and tithe barns. The latter still stand, but the hospital and school are known only through archaeological excavations. A herb garden is still maintained at the site.

== Burials ==
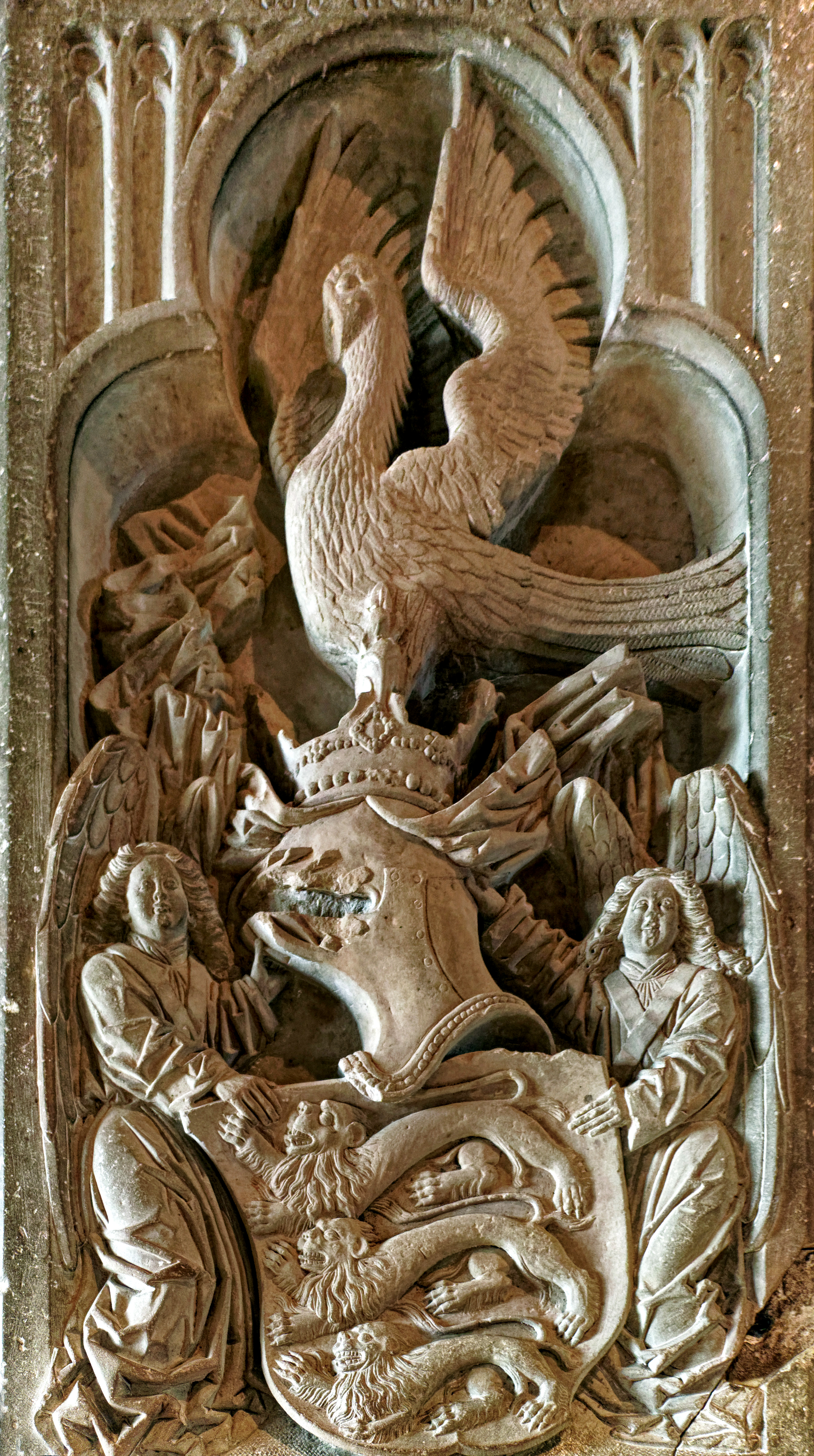
Staufer tomb slab

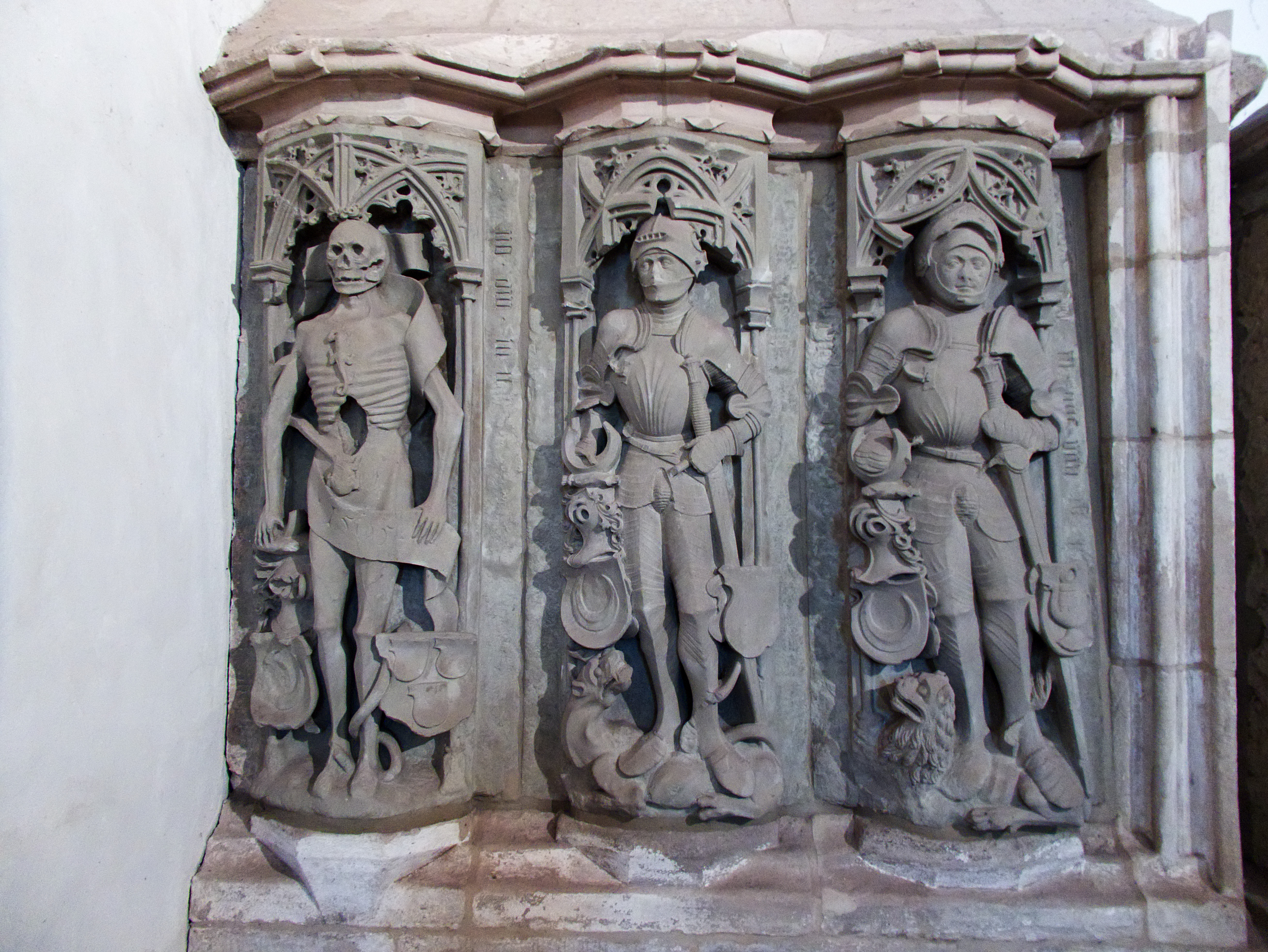
Woellwarth tomb slabs

Known or suspected Staufer burials at Lorch include:

- Frederick I, Duke of Swabia
- Henry (VI), Conrad III's son and co-king
- Judith of Bavaria, Barbarossa's mother
- Rainald and William, Barbarossa's sons who died in infancy
- Beatrice of Swabia, Barbarossa's daughter
- Conrad II, Duke of Swabia
- Irene Angelina, queen
- Beatrice of Swabia, empress

The Staufer were remembered annually by the monks on September 2.

In addition, the tombs of the abbots were also in the abbey. There are many surviving tomb slabs, some richly decorated. Some of the Woellwarth tomb slabs are also preserved.

== List of abbots ==
Lorch had 25 recorded Catholic abbots and one administrator. Their dates of tenure are often uncertain.

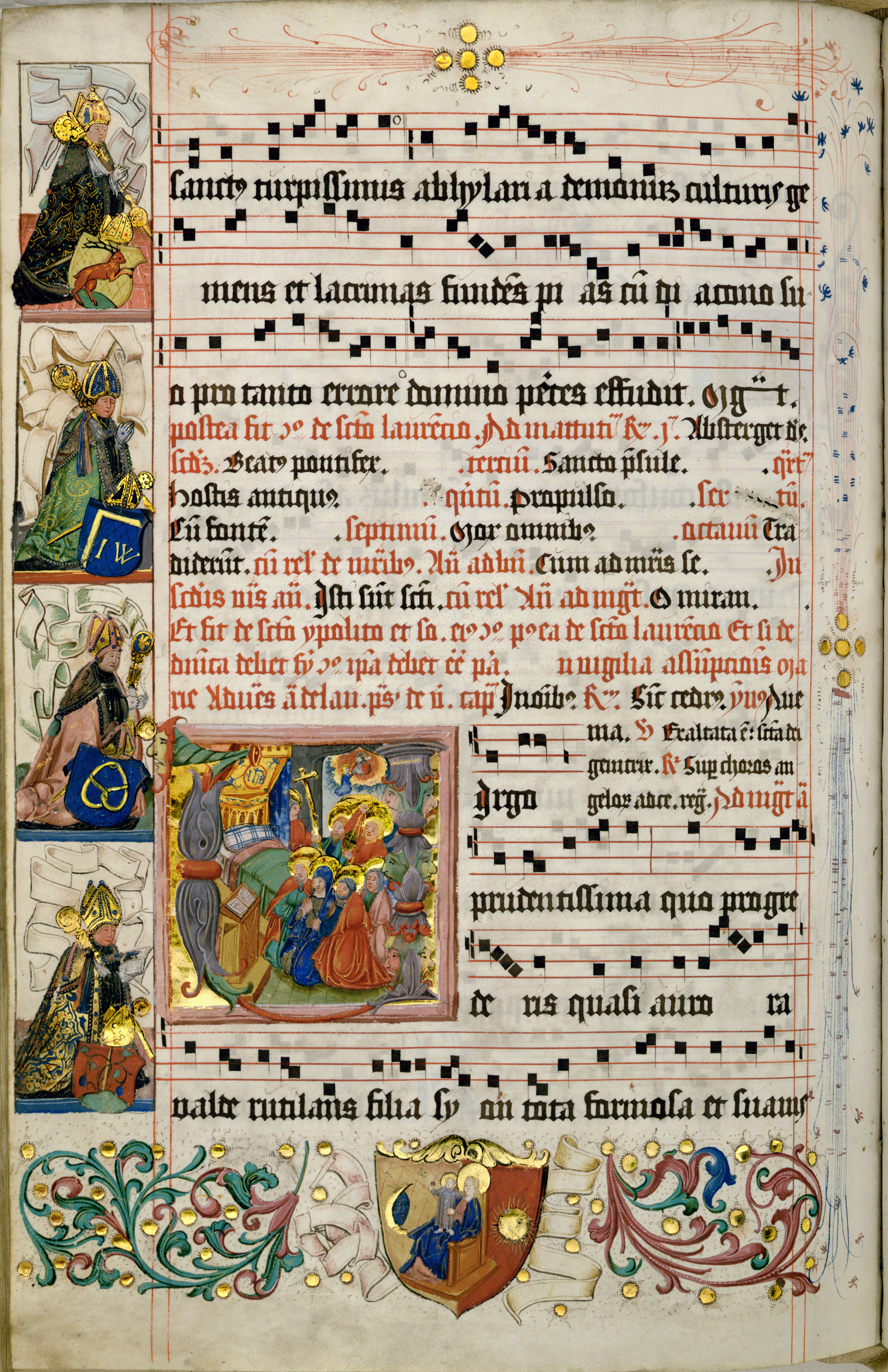
A page from one of the Lorch choir books, depicting (at left, top to bottom) Abbots Nikolaus Schenk von Arberg, Jodokus Winkelhofer, Georg Kerler and Sebastian Sitterich

1. Harpert, 1102?–1124
2. Kraft, fl. 1136–1162
3. Heinrich, fl. 1162–1194
4. Friedrich (I), fl. 1239
5. Konrad, fl. 1251
6. Ulrich (I), fl. 1260–1278
7. Gebezo, fl. 1290–1295
8. Friedrich (II), fl. 1328
9. Ulrich (II), dates uncertain
10. Kuno von Gundelfingen, resigned as abbot in 1329, as administrator in 1330
11. Ludwg (I), 1337–1360
12. Ludwig (II) von Stubenberg, 1360–1371
13. Volkart (I) von Schechingen, 1372–1389
14. Volkart (II) von Woellwarth, 1389–1399
15. Johannes von Schechingen, 1399/1412–????
16. Wilhelm Schenk von Arberg, 1416–1441
17. Volkart (III) von Schechingen, 1441–1461
18. Nikolaus Schenk von Arberg, 1460/77–1479
19. Jodokus Winkelhofer, 1480–????
20. Georg Kerler, ????–1510
21. Sebastian Sitterich, 1510–1525
22. Laurentius Autenrieth, c. 1526–1548
23. Benedikt Rebstock, 1549–1563
24. Friedrich (III) Kohler, 1630–1639, administrator
25. Vincentius Haug, 1639–1641
26. Placidus Rauber, 1641–1648
