= Lorch choirbooks =

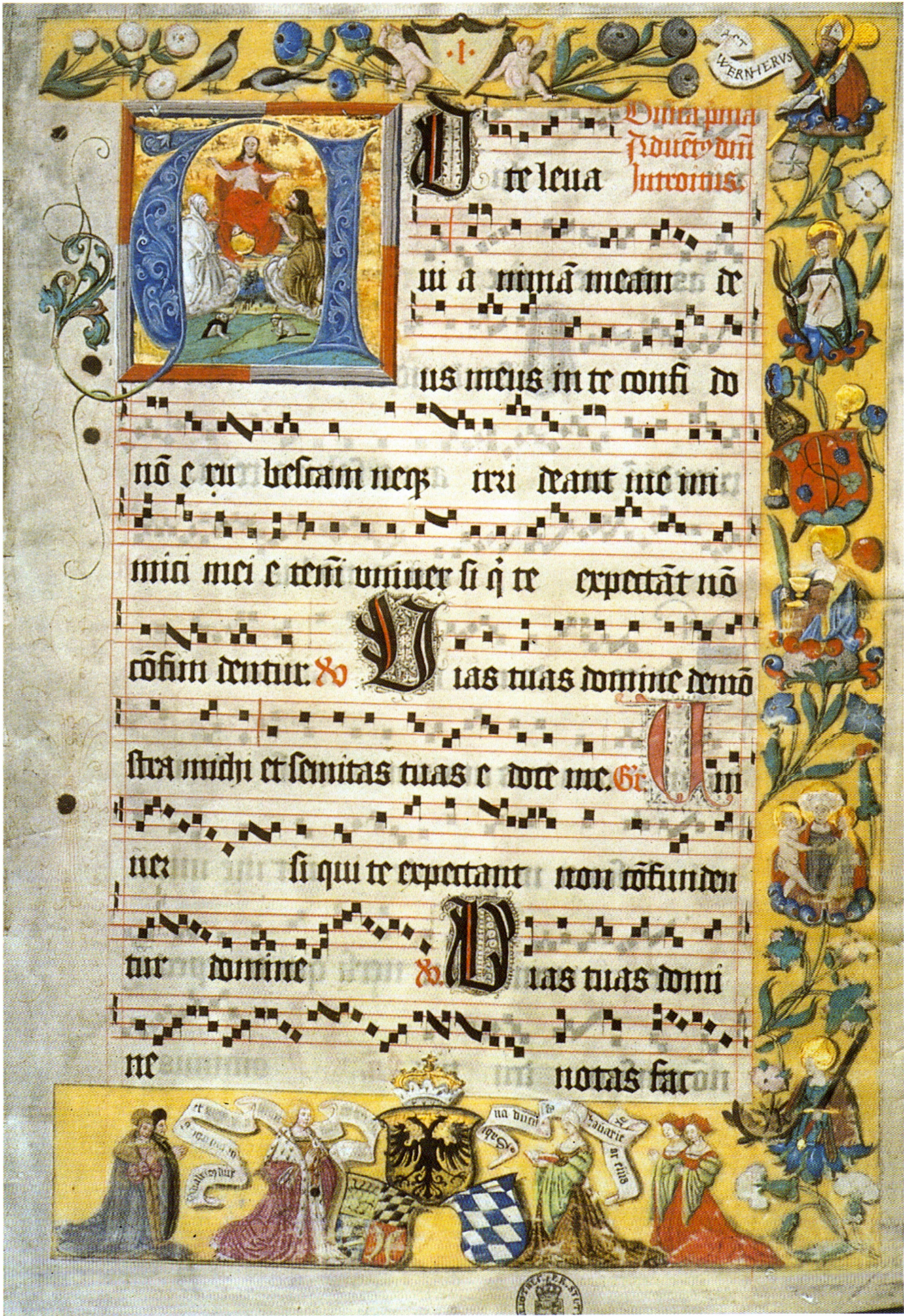
Page from one of the Lorch choirbooks with the donor portrait of Duke Ulrich and Duchess Sabina at the bottom

The Lorch choirbooks (shelfmarks Cod. mus. I 2° 63–65) are three illuminated choirbooks produced at the monastery of Lorch in 1511–1512. Although a total of five choir books were produced at the time, only three survive. Today, they are kept in the Württemberg State Library, although copies are on display at Lorch.

The books together contain 1,784 pages and are the work of five different scribes. The musical notes were added by Leonhard Wagner. The historiated initials and the marginal miniatures were painted by Nikolaus Bertschi and his workshop. There are 108 large initials with borders and 63 smaller initials. They contain depictions of religious scenes and monastic life. Although Bertschi's workshop was in Augsburg, the choirbooks were probably painted at Lorch.

The books were intended for the use of the monks of Lorch. Two of the books contain hymns and antiphons for the liturgy of the hours, while the third contains settings for the Mass. The large format of the books allowed them to be read by the choir when set on a stand. The main financiers of the project to create five deluxe choir books were Duke Ulrich of Württemberg and his wife Sabina, who made the donation in celebration of their wedding in 1511. Many other local notables, both priests and laymen, donated to the work. Their coats of arms are sprinkled throughout the books, while Ulrich and Sabina received donor portraits.

A man with a hoopoe on his head

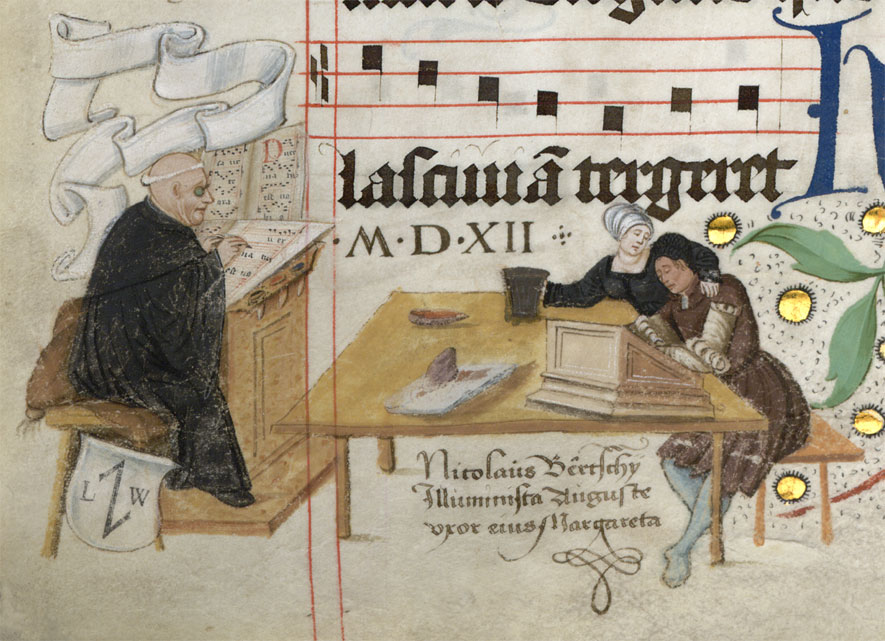
Wagner adding the notes and Bertschi doing the illustrations with the help of his wife Margaret

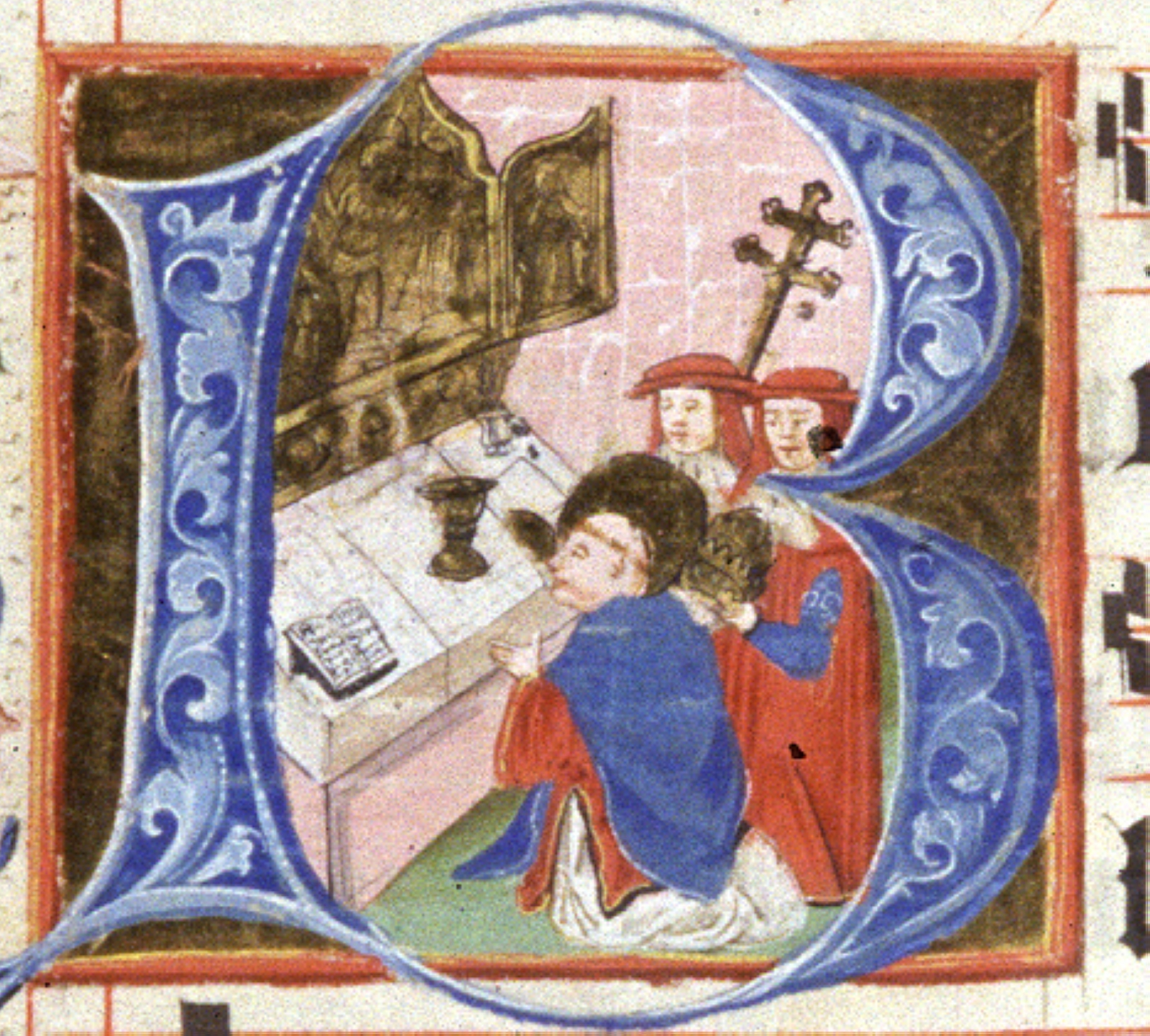
Monks celebrating Mass

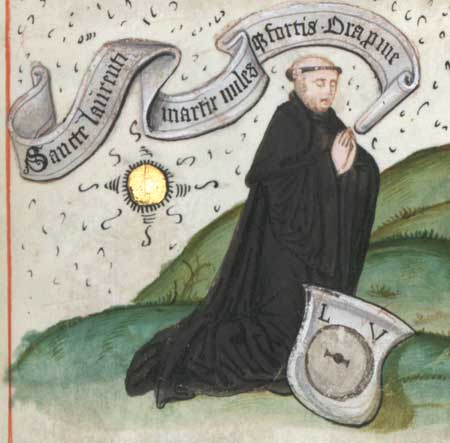
Abbot Laurentius Autenrieth
