= Hans Kloss (artist) =

German artist (1938–2018)

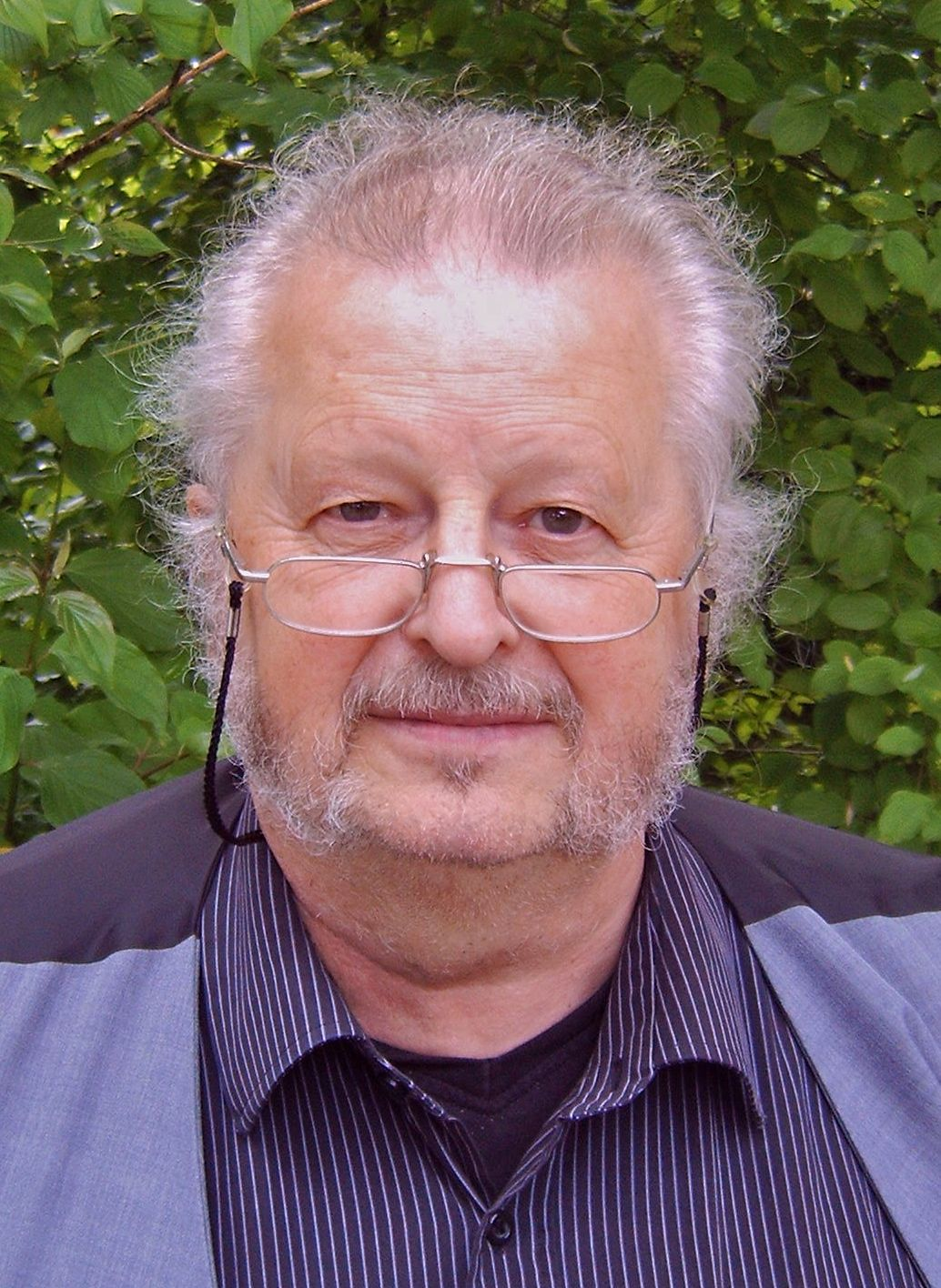
- Kloss in 2009
- Born: July 12, 1938; Ohlau, Silesia
- Died: September 12, 2018 (aged 80)
- Education: Fachschule für Gestaltung, Schwäbisch Gmünd
- Known for: Painting, graphic design
- Notable work: Staufer-Rundbild, Staufersaga-Panorama
- Style: Medieval and modern styles
- Spouse: Maria Kloss
- Awards: Premio Internazionale Federichino; 2004; Irenen-Preis; 2003
- Website: www.hans-kloss.de/index.htm

Hans Kloss (12 July 1938 – 12 September 2018) was a German artist and graphic designer. He is best known for his large paintings combining medieval and modern styles.

== Early life ==
Kloss was born in Ohlau, Silesia, on 12 July 1938. He trained as a ceramics painter, and studied at the Fachschule für Gestaltung in Schwäbisch Gmünd, a town in the eastern part of Baden-Württemberg, where he settled in 1953. In 1969 he moved to the neighboring town of Lorch, where he remained.

== Work ==
Kloss' most famous work is his Staufer-Rundbild, a panoramic painting depicting in great detail the history of the House of Hohenstaufen, a powerful ruling house in the 12th and 13th centuries. Located in Lorch monastery, his panorama is 30 m (98 ft) long and 4.5 m (15 ft) tall. He started the painting in 1997, and completed it in 2002, the 900th anniversary of the monastery. Starting in 2012, Kloss was working on a new 47 square meter Staufersaga-Panorama, which he completed in 2015. It can be seen in the new Panoramamuseum Schwäbisch Gmünd.

A monumental altar of his, in the style of Jerg Ratgeb, was bought by the Sammlung Würth in 2004.

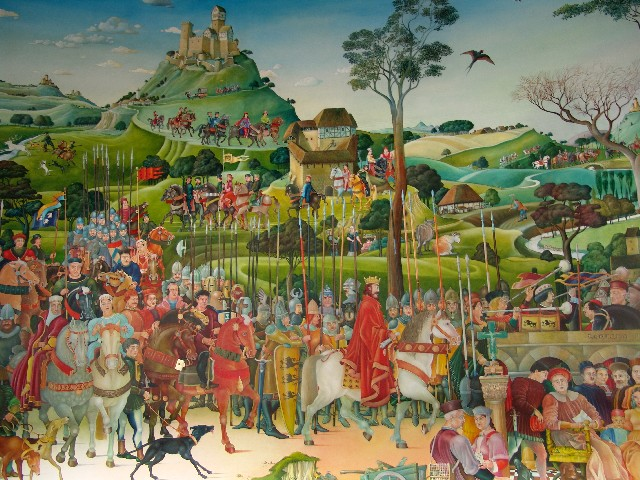
A detail of Staufer-Rundbild (2002)

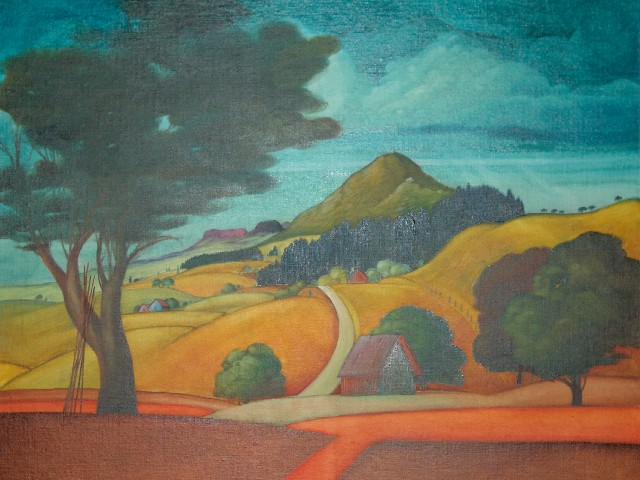
Hohenrechberg (2002)

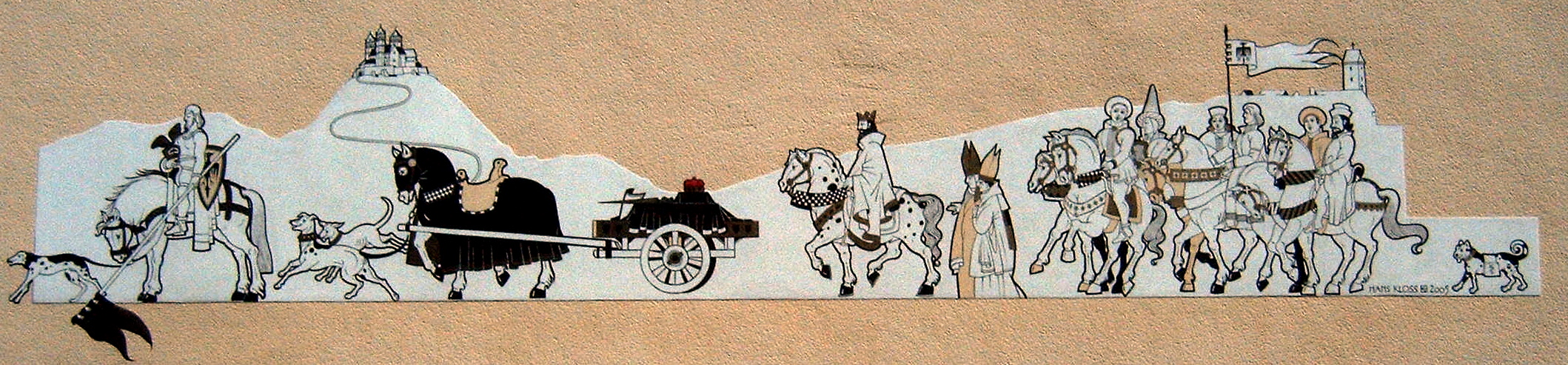
Umbettung von Herzog Friedrich I. (2005)

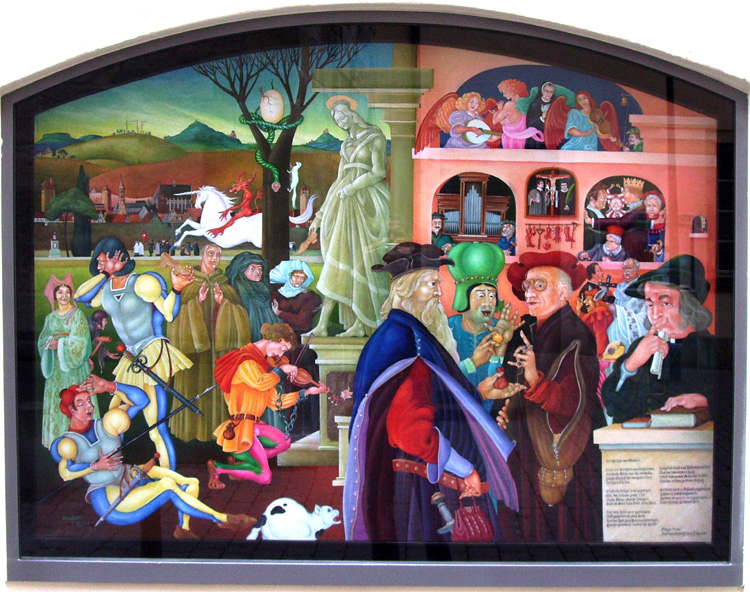
Der Geiger zu Gmünd (2006), inspired by a poem of the same name by Justinus Kerner

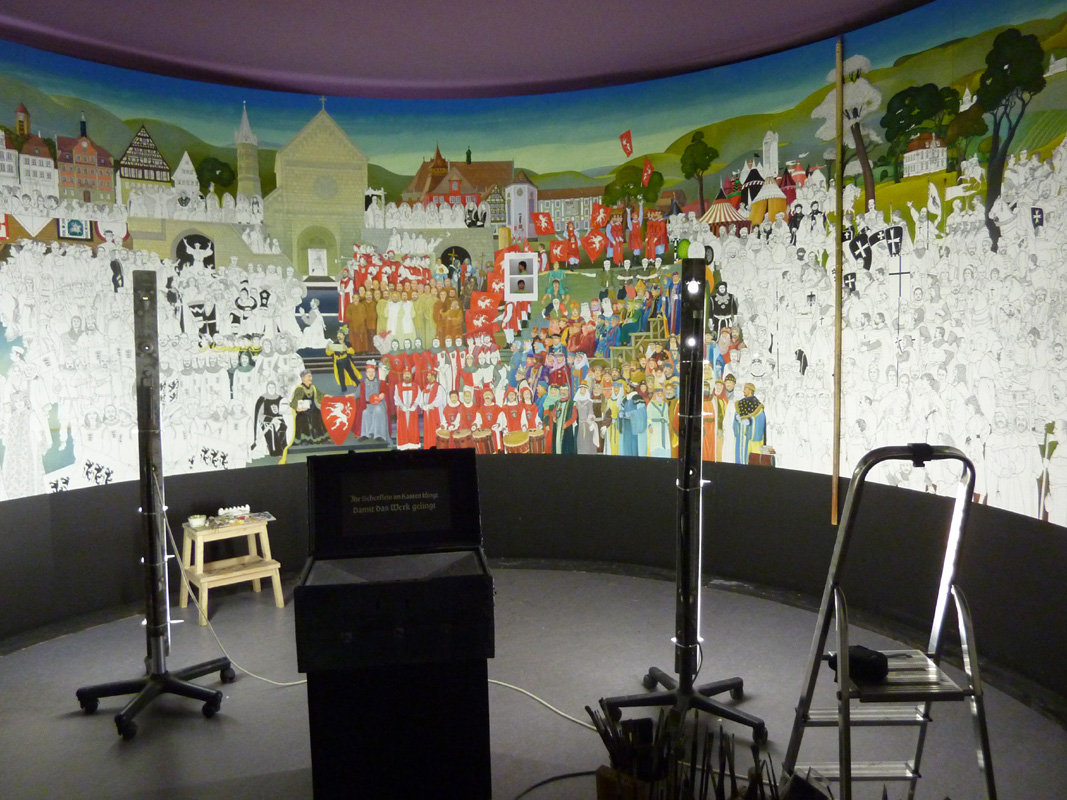
Kloss' studio, with his Staufersaga still in progress, (2013)

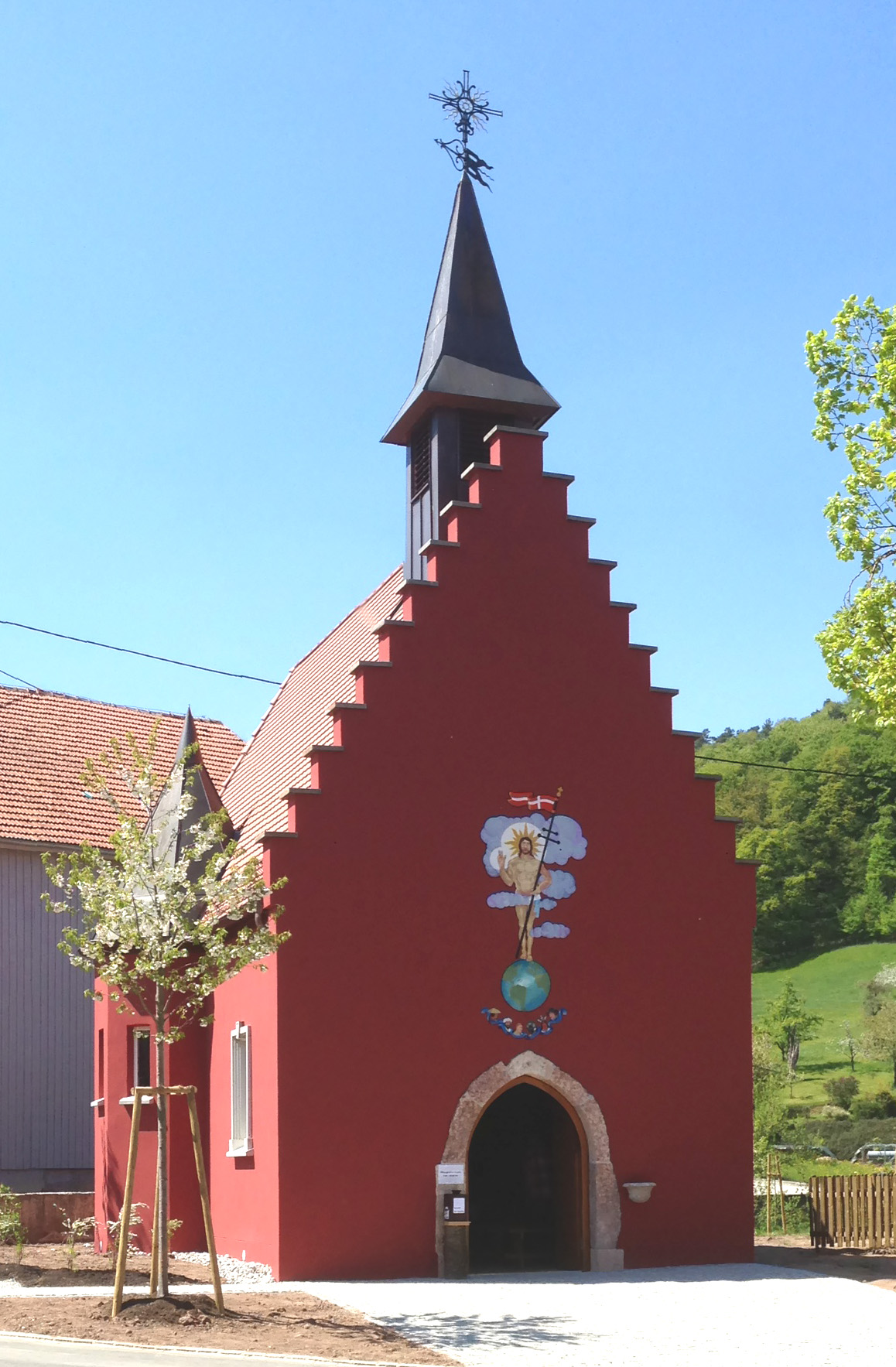
Ascension Chapel in Herdtlinsweiler

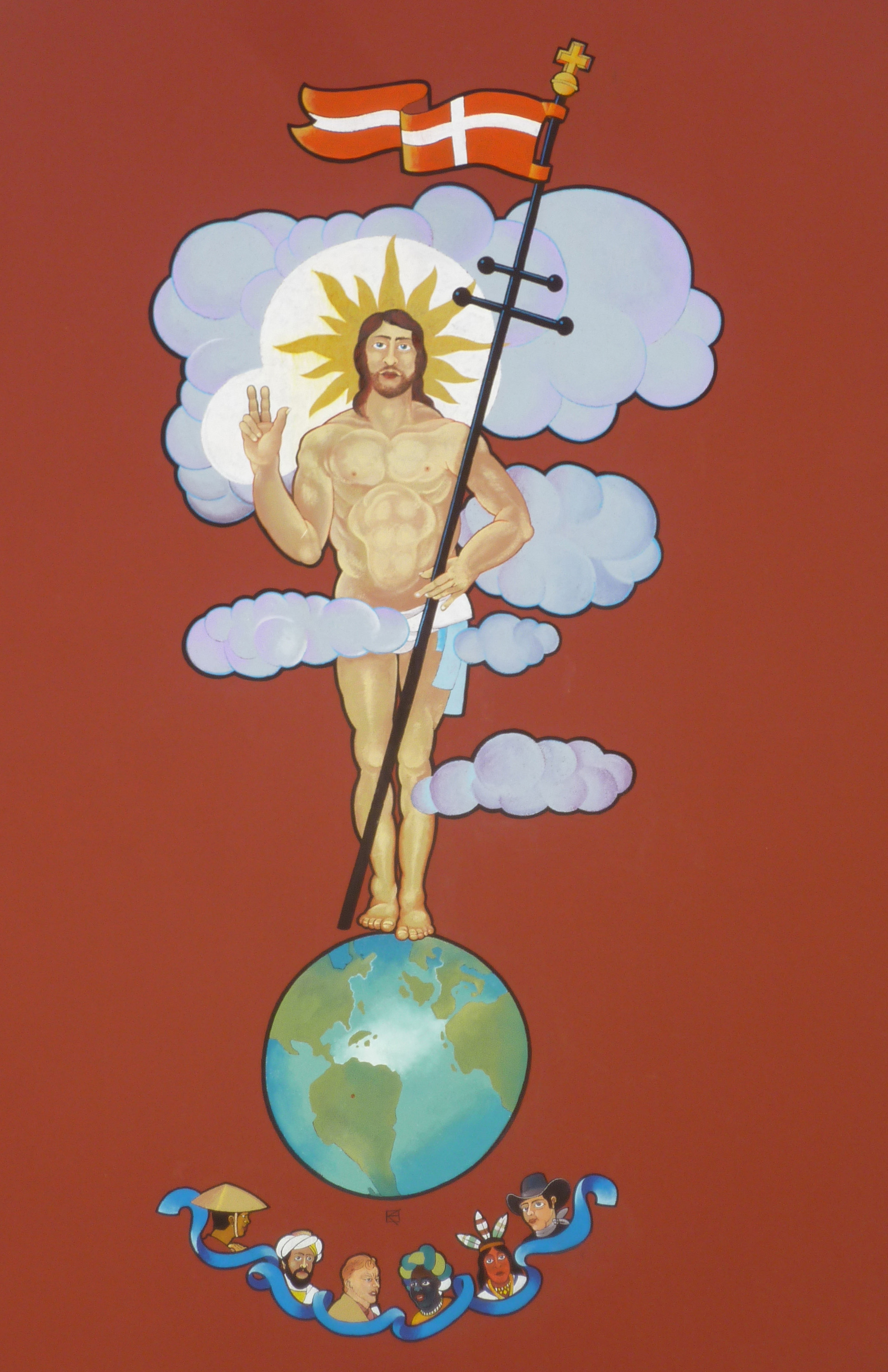
Mural by Hans Kloss on the Ascension Chapel in Herdtlinsweiler (2016)

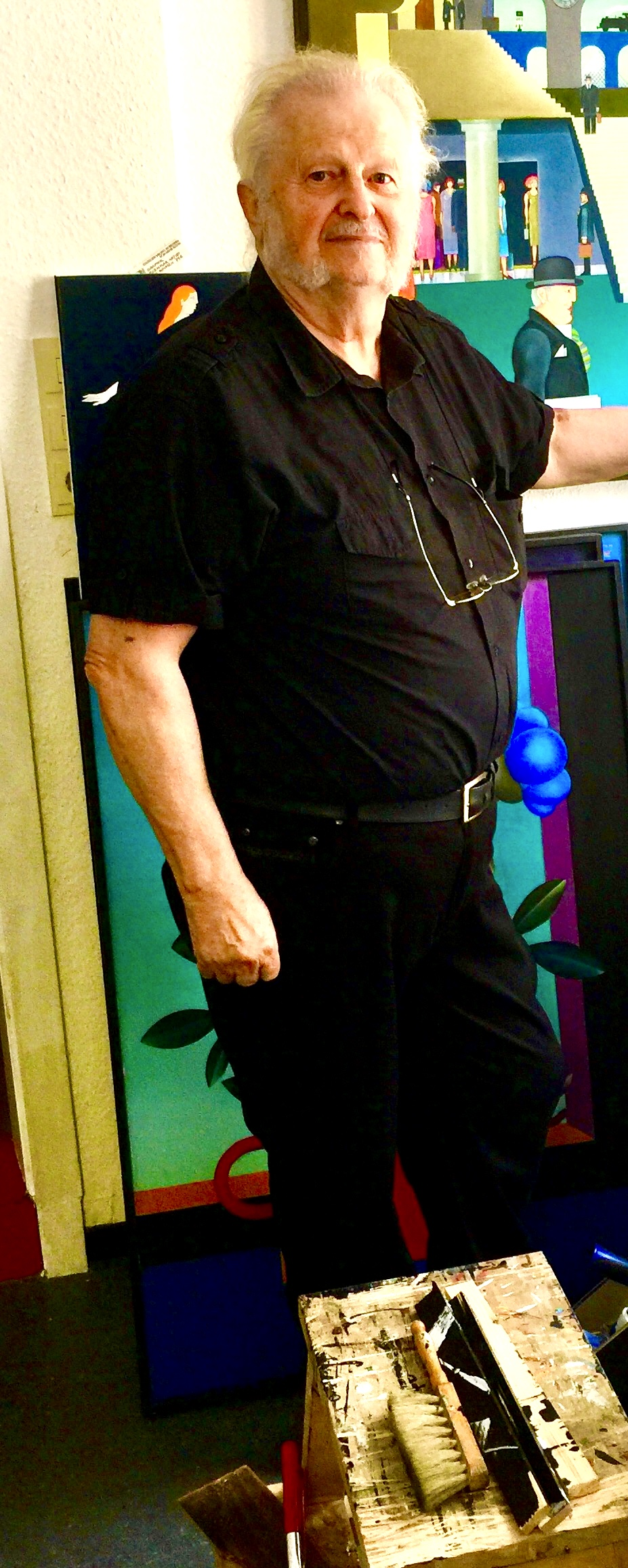
Hans Kloss in his studio at the Panorama Museum, July 2018

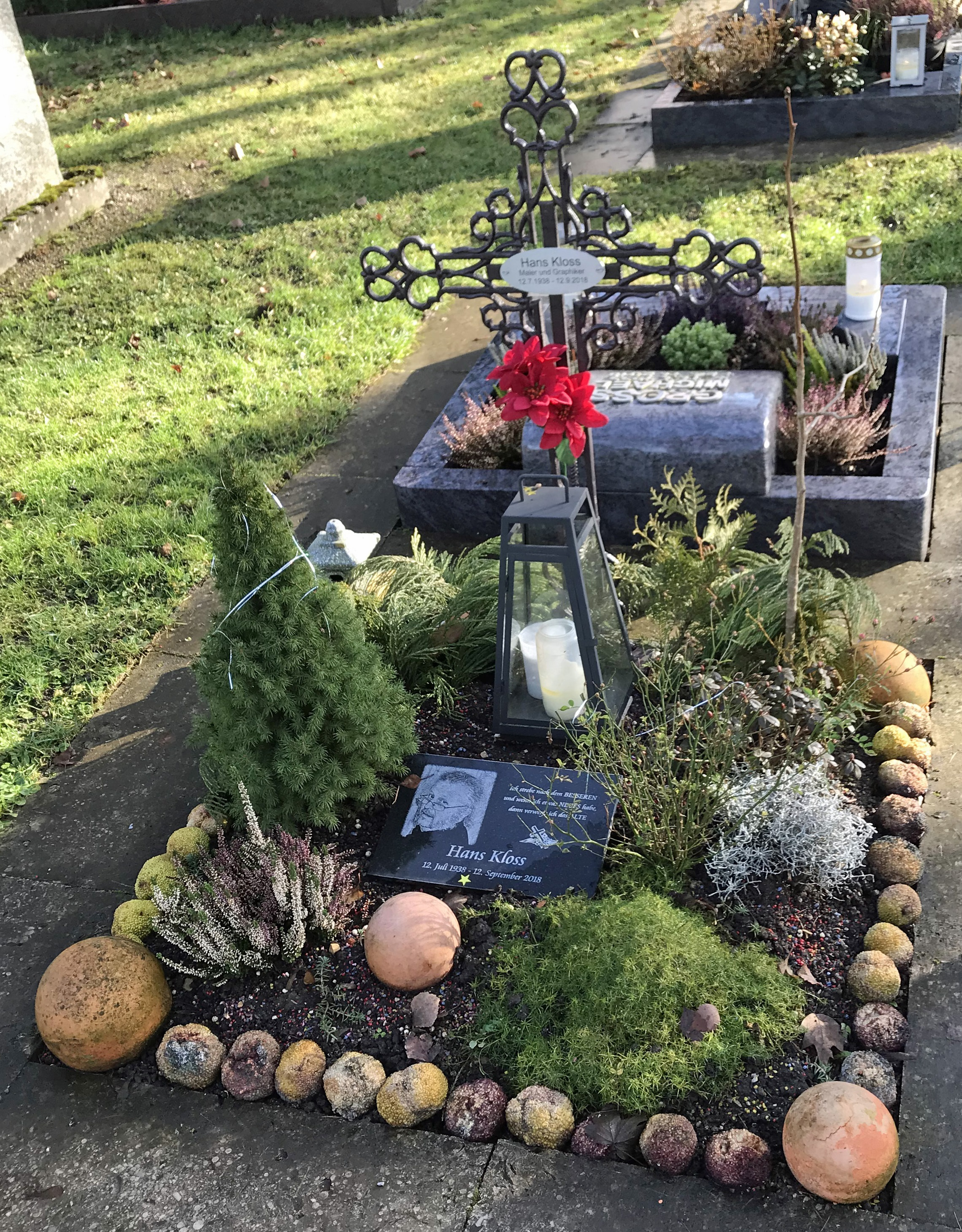
Grave of Hans Kloss at St. Leonhard's Cemetery (Schwäbisch Gmünd) in Schwäbisch Gmünd

For his work, Kloss has received the Premio Internazionale Federichino of Iesi, Italy in 2004; the Staufermedaille of the state of Baden-Württemberg in 2005; and the Irenen-Preis of the Freundeskreis Königin Irene Maria von Byzanz e.V. of Göppingen in 2003.

== Personal life ==
Kloss was formerly married to Maria Kloss, a fellow painter. Kloss was a member of the Social Democratic Party, and was a member of Lorch's municipal council, starting in the late 1970s. He was part of the administration and finance committee. He left the council in 2009, saying he was disappointed about the lack of estimation of his work.
