= Mariusz Gancarczyk =

Polish footballer (born 1988)

Personal information
- Full name: Mariusz Gancarczyk
- Date of birth: 5 November 1988 (age 37)
- Place of birth: Ruda Śląska, Poland
- Height: 1.85 m (6 ft 1 in)
- Position: Defender

Youth career
- Wawel Wirek

Senior career*
Years	Team	Apps	(Gls)
2005–2007	Wawel Wirek		
2007–2009	Górnik Zabrze	10	(0)
2007–2012	Górnik Zabrze II		
2011	→ ROW Rybnik (loan)	8	(0)
2012–2016	Slavia Ruda Śląska		
2016–2017	Wawel Wirek		
2021–2022	AKS Mikołów	32	(2)
2022–2023	Szombierki Bytom	25	(2)
2024–2025	AKS Mikołów	10	(0)

International career
2009	Poland U21	6	(0)
- * Club domestic league appearances and goals as of 10:40, 19 June 2025 (UTC)

Mariusz Gancarczyk (born 5 November 1988) is a Polish professional footballer who plays as a defender.

== Career ==
He is a trainee of Wawel Wirek.
