= Świny Castle =

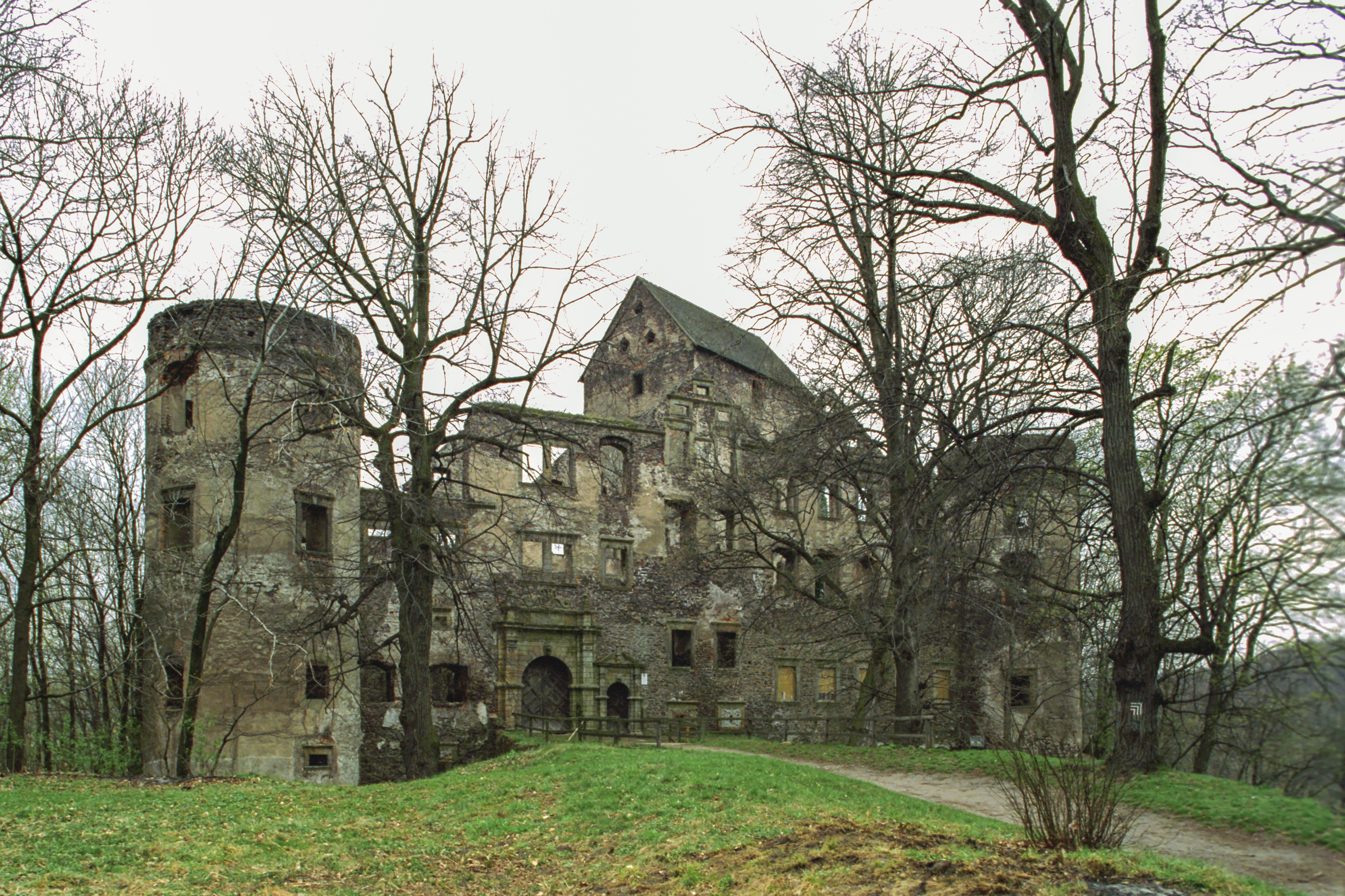
- Świny Castle

- Location of the Świny Castle in Poland Świny Castle (Lower Silesian Voivodeship)
- 50°56′20″N 16°06′43″E
- Location: Świny, Lower Silesian Voivodeship; in Poland

History
- Built: 1108
- Demolished: 1840 (hurricanes), 1876 (fire)

Site notes
- Architectural styles: Gothic, Renaissance

Świny Castle (Polish: Zamek Świny; formerly Schweinhausburg in German) - formerly a gord, as a stronghold existed in its location already in the fifth century - securing the Lubawecki mountain pass, the site was recorded in Cosmas' documents from 1108, where the gord is recorded as Suini in Poloniae. Possibly, soon after, the gord had been expanded into a military stronghold, at which time it was the seat of the castellans. The castle was mentioned in Pope Adrian IV's Papal bull.

By the 13th century, it had prominent owners including Tader in 1230, Jaksa in 1242, and Piotr of Świn in 1248. In the 1270s, Bolko I the Strict's decision led to the loss of its status as a castellany to the newer Bolków Castle. By 1272, the castle had transitioned to knightly ownership, with "dominus Jan de Swin" mentioned in a document from Bolesław the Tall, Duke of Wrocław. In 1313, Piotr de Svyne was noted in the entourage of Bernard of Świdnica. The Śwink family (von Schweinichen) took ownership in the early 14th century, with Henricus de Swyn documented as the owner in 1323. After the Bolków Castle was constructed, the castle began to lose its significance.

In the mid-14th century, the Śwink family replaced the wooden fortifications with a four-story residential-defense tower made from stone, featuring 2.5-meter thick walls. The tower, measuring 12 by 18 meters, had a cellar and was topped with a gabled roof. Its Gothic entrance portal still survives.

In the mid-15th century, Günzel von Schweinichen added a two-gabled residential building and new perimeter fortifications. Between 1614 and 1660, Johann Sigismund von Schweinichen transformed the castle into a Renaissance residence. He also established a theosophical circle and a mystical-theosophical library in Świny. The mystic Jakob Böhme stayed at the castle in 1624 and wrote "Epistle to the Longing and Hungry Soul."

After the extinction of the Śwink/von Schweinichen family line in 1702 with George Ernest von Schweinichen the Younger, the castle was inherited by Sebastian Henryk von Schweinitz in 1713. Despite surviving the Hussite Wars and the Thirty Years' War, the castle was plundered by Russian troops during the Seven Years' War in 1762. Hurricanes in 1840, 1848, and 1868, and a fire in 1876 caused further damage. Efforts to secure the deteriorating structure began in 1931, with partial restoration in 1936-1937. More significant conservation work resumed 30 years later.

Archaeological work near the castle in 1959 revealed evidence of an early medieval settlement. Since 1991, the castle has been privately owned. In 2008, Świny Castle celebrated its 900th anniversary with a monument erected near the ruins. Later that year, the castle changed hands again. The entrance features a cartouche with the von Schweinichen family coat of arms.
