= Otto of Sankt Blasien =

German Benedictine chronicler

Otto of Sankt Blasien was a German Benedictine chronicler. He was born about the middle of the 12th century; died on 23 July 1223, at Sankt Blasien in the Black Forest, Baden (southwestern Germany). Nothing is known of the events of his life.

It is probable that in his later days he became abbot of the renowned Benedictine monastery of Sankt Blasien.

He is known as the writer who continued the chronicles of Otto of Freising; like Otto, he possessed a great talent for presenting a clear survey of events. His language was lofty, and followed the model of the ancient classics. Like many of his contemporaries, he liked to apply the fixed formulas of Justinian to the German emperors, probably on the assumption, then widespread, that the Holy Roman Empire was only the continuation of the Roman Empire of the Caesars.

His chronicles, written in the form of annals, Ad librum VII chronici Ottonis Frisingensis episcopi continuatae historiae appendix sive Continuatio Sanblasiana, embrace the period from 1146 to 1209, that is the period from Conrad III to the murder of Philip of Swabia. Since he was distant in time from the facts he narrates, his accounts are quite objective, even though he makes no concealment of his prejudice in favour of the Hohenstaufen dynasty, which in 1218 received the bailiwick of St. Blasien from the dukes of Zahringen. Yet, after Otto of Brunswick was recognized as Holy Roman emperor, he writes of him in the same objective way as of his predecessors.

Nevertheless, without any apparent cause, the narrative breaks off at the coronation of Otto IV. Perhaps the chronicler shrank from describing the bloody party conflicts of the times. His chief sources were the "Gesta Friderici" and perhaps Alsatian chronicles. On the whole his statements may be trusted. It is only when he has to resort to oral reports that he becomes unreliable; this is especially the case in his chronology, though he is not to be reproached with intentional misrepresentation of facts for this reason.

His chronicles were published by R. Wilmans in "Monumenta Germaniae Historica: Script." (XX, pp. 304–34); they were translated into German by Horst Kohl in "Geschichtschreiber der deutschen Vorzeit" (12th century, volume VIII, Leipzig, 1881, 2nd ed., 1894).
