= Janusz Gancarczyk =

Polish footballer (born 1984)

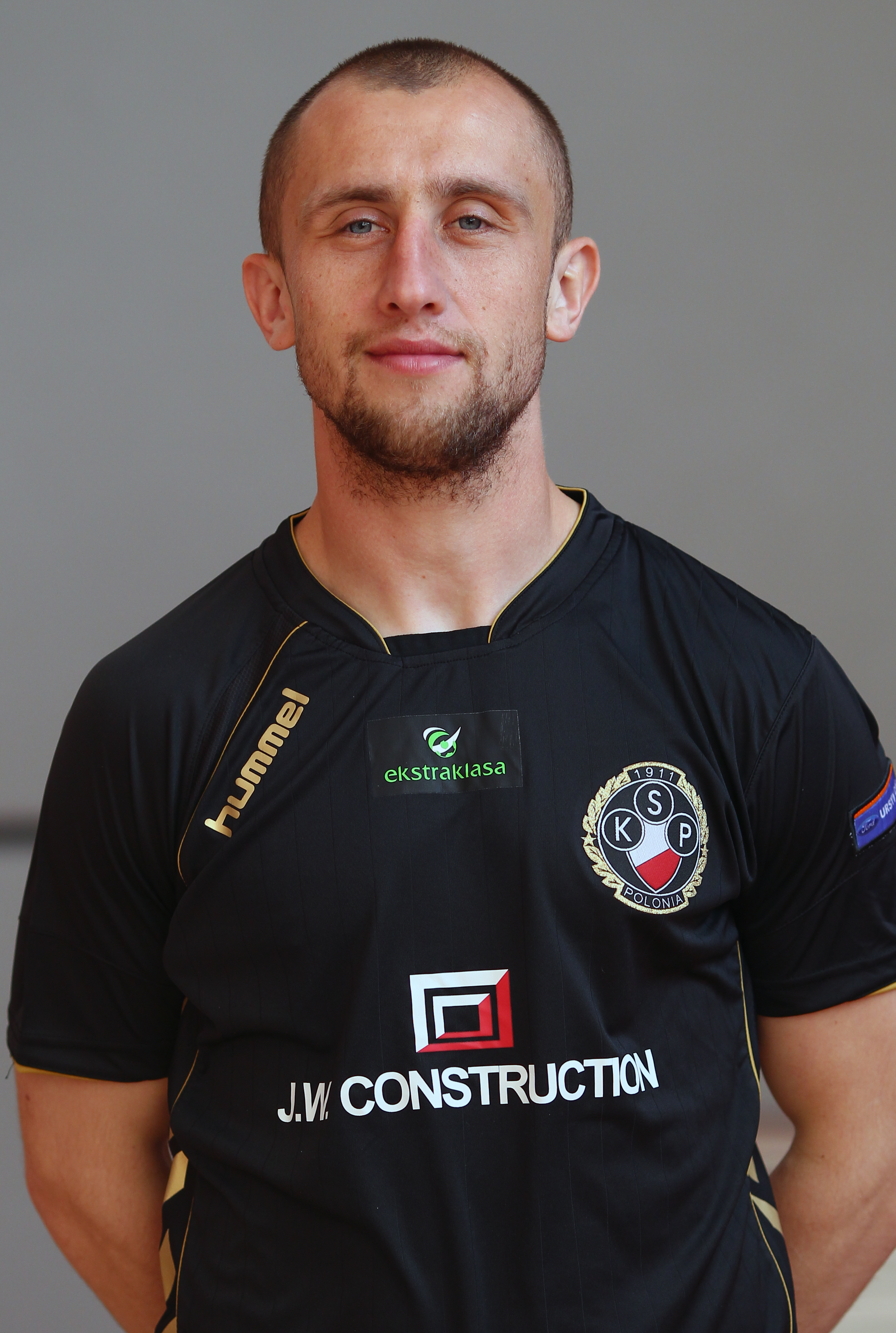
- Gancarczyk with Polonia Warsaw in 2011

Personal information
- Date of birth: 19 June 1984 (age 42)
- Place of birth: Oława, Poland
- Height: 1.79 m (5 ft 10 1/2 in)
- Position: Midfielder

Team information
- Current team: Orzeł Marszowice
- Number: 18

Youth career
- MKS Oława

Senior career*
Years	Team	Apps	(Gls)
2002–2006	MKS Oława		
2006–2007	Górnik Polkowice	27	(4)
2007–2009	Śląsk Wrocław	64	(7)
2010–2011	Polonia Warsaw	31	(1)
2011–2013	Zagłębie Lubin	14	(0)
2013–2014	GKS Katowice	58	(7)
2014	MKS Oława	4	(1)
2014–2017	Odra Opole	45	(17)
2017–2019	Foto-Higiena Gać	41	(17)
2019–2021	Moto Jelcz Oława	47	(40)
2021–2022	Kotwica Kołobrzeg	12	(2)
2022–2025	Moto Jelcz Oława	90	(24)
2025	Stal Brzeg	4	(1)
2025	Stal Brzeg II	6	(0)
2026–	Orzeł Marszowice	13	(3)

International career
2009	Poland	1	(0)
- * Club domestic league appearances and goals as of 10:03, 15 June 2026 (UTC)

Janusz Gancarczyk (born 19 June 1984) is a Polish professional footballer who plays as a midfielder for regional league club Orzeł Marszowice.

== Club career ==
In the past, Gancarczyk played for MKS Oława, Górnik Polkowice and Śląsk Wrocław.

In January 2010, he joined Polonia Warsaw.

In July 2011, he joined Zagłębie Lubin on a free transfer and signed a three-year contract.

== International career ==
Gancarczyk earned one cap for the Poland national team. He played the last 21 minutes in a friendly against Canada on 18 November 2009.

== Personal life ==
His brothers Marek, Waldemar, Mateusz and Krzysztof are also all footballers.

== Career statistics ==
=== International ===
Appearances and goals by national team and year
National team	Year	Apps	Goals
Poland
Poland	2009	1	0
Total		1	0

== Honours ==
Śląsk Wrocław

- Ekstraklasa Cup: 2008–09

Odra Opole

- III liga Opole–Silesia: 2015–16
- Polish Cup (Opole regionals): 2014–15, 2015–16

Foto-Higiena Gać

- IV liga Lower Silesia East: 2017–18

Moto Jelcz Oława

- Regional league Wrocław: 2018–19

Kotwica Kołobrzeg

- III liga, group II: 2021–22
