= Marek Gancarczyk =

Polish footballer

Personal information
- Full name: Marek Gancarczyk
- Date of birth: 19 February 1983 (age 43)
- Place of birth: Grodków, Poland
- Height: 1.78 m (5 ft 10 in)
- Position: Midfielder

Senior career*
Years	Team	Apps	(Gls)
2002–2004	MKS Oława		
2004–2007	Górnik Polkowice	79	(13)
2007–2012	Śląsk Wrocław	77	(8)
2012	→ ŁKS Łódź (loan)	6	(1)
2012	MKS Oława	2	(0)
2013	SSV Markranstädt	10	(1)
2013–2015	Chojniczanka Chojnice	43	(12)
2015–2016	Miedź Legnica	22	(0)
2016–2018	Odra Opole	53	(8)
2018	Foto-Higiena Gać	12	(4)
2023–2024	Howden Clough FC	2	(1)
- * Club domestic league appearances and goals

Marek Gancarczyk (born 19 February 1983) is a Polish former professional footballer who played as a midfielder.

== Career ==
=== Club ===
He was a player for MKS Oława and Górnik Polkowice.

== Personal life ==
His brother is Janusz Gancarczyk who plays for Moto Jelcz Oława.

== Honours ==
Śląsk Wrocław

- Ekstraklasa Cup: 2008–09
